= Outline of Glacier National Park (U.S.) =

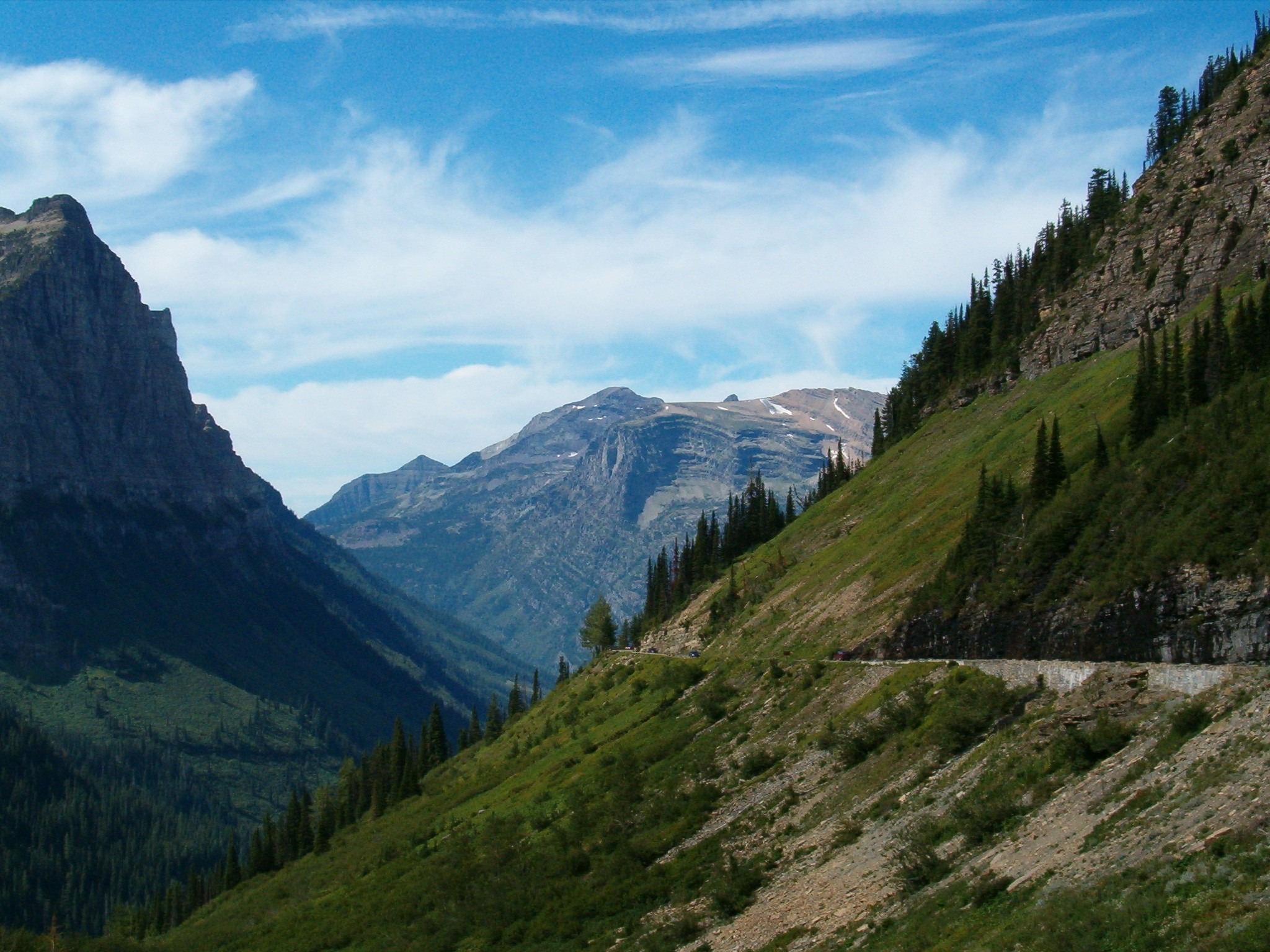
The Going-to-the-Sun Road as seen above McDonald Valley.

The following articles relate to the history, geography, geology, flora, fauna, structures and recreation in Glacier National Park (U.S.), the U.S. portion of the Waterton-Glacier International Peace Park.

== Glacier National Park history ==
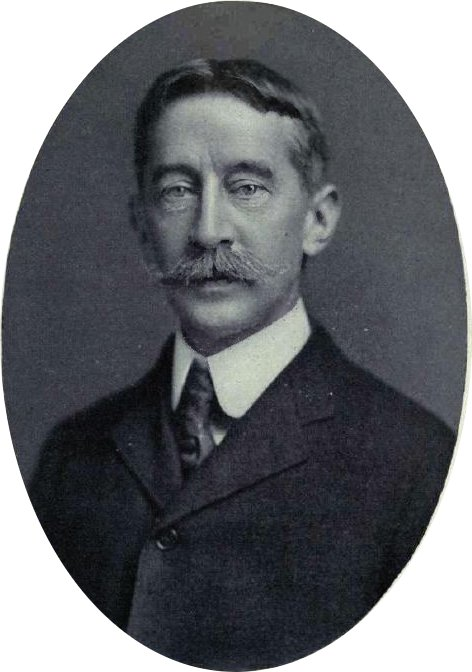
George Bird Grinnell

- Exploration
- People
  - Explorers
    - Norman Clyde, mountaineer with many first ascents
    - James Willard Schultz, author, guide, responsible for naming a great many Glacier peaks, passes and lakes.
    - John Frank Stevens, first European to discover Marias Pass, 1889
    - Frank B. Wynn, first to climb the highest peak in the park, 1920
  - Park superintendents and administrators
  - Park rangers
  - Engineers and architects
  - Photographers, artists and illustrators
  - Naturalists and scientists
    - George Bird Grinnell - Early naturalist promoting Glacier
    - A. Starker Leopold - author of the 1963 Leopold Report-Wildlife Management in the National Parks
  - Military
  - Politicians
    - William Howard Taft - U.S. president who signed law creating Glacier, May 11, 1910
    - Henry L. Stimson - Politician and promoter of creating the park
  - Promoters
    - Louis W. Hill, Great Northern Railway
- Historic events
  - History of the National Park Service
  - Mission 66 - National Park Service ten-year program to prepare parks for 1966 50th Anniversary
- Advocates
- Concessionaires
  - Don Hummel
  - Glacier Park Company
  - James Jerome Hill, Chief executive of Great Northern Railway

== Geography ==
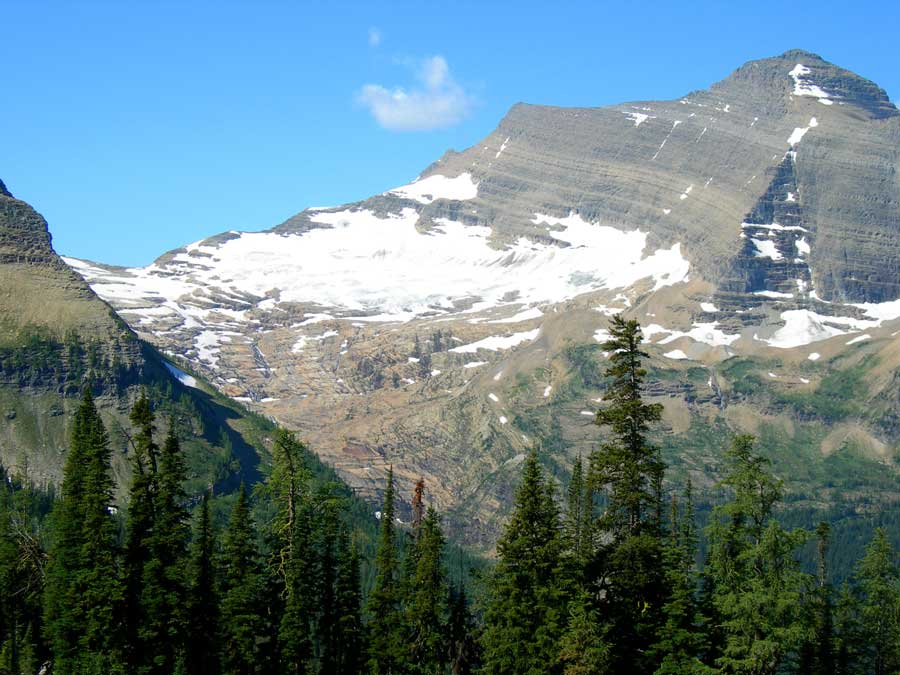
Agassiz Glacier 2005

- Glaciers
  - Retreat of Glaciers in Rocky Mountains
  - Agassiz Glacier
  - Ahern Glacier
  - Baby Glacier
  - Blackfoot Glacier
  - Boulder Glacier
  - Carter Glaciers
  - Chaney Glacier
  - Dixon Glacier
  - Gem Glacier
  - Grinnell Glacier
  - Harris Glacier
  - Harrison Glacier
  - Herbst Glacier
  - Hudson Glacier
  - Ipasha Glacier
  - Jackson Glacier
  - Kintla Glacier
  - Logan Glacier
  - Lupfer Glacier
  - Miche Wabun Glacier
  - North Swiftcurrent Glacier
  - Old Sun Glacier
  - Piegan Glacier
  - Pumpelly Glacier
  - Pumpkin Glacier
  - Rainbow Glacier
  - Red Eagle Glacier
  - Sexton Glacier
  - Shepard Glacier
  - Siyeh Glacier
  - Sperry Glacier
  - Swiftcurrent Glacier
  - The Salamander Glacier
  - Thunderbird Glacier
  - Two Ocean Glacier
  - Vulture Glacier
  - Weasel Collar Glacier
  - Whitecrow Glacier
- Lakes
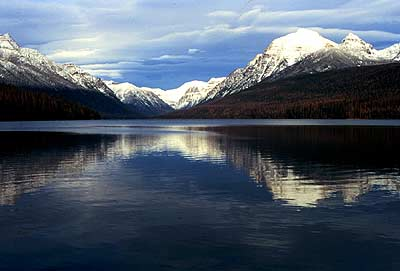
  Bowman Lake
  - Akaiyan Lake
  - Arrow Lake
  - Atsina Lake
  - Aurice Lake
  - Avalanche Lake
  - Beaver Woman Lake
  - Bench Lake
  - Bowman Lake
  - Boy Lake
  - Buffalo Woman Lake
  - Camas Lake
  - Carcajou Lake
  - Cerulean Lake
  - Cobalt Lake
  - Cosley Lake
  - Cracker Lake
  - Elizabeth Lake
  - Falling Leaf Lake
  - Feather Woman Lake
  - Fishercap Lake
  - Gem Lake
  - Glenns Lake
  - Goat Lake
  - Goat Haunt Lake
  - Grace Lake
  - Green Lake
  - Gunsight Lake
  - Gyrfalcon Lake
  - Harrison Lake
  - Helen Lake
  - Hidden Lake
  - Iceberg Lake
  - Ipasha Lake
  - Jackstraw Lake
  - Kaina Lake
  - Katoya Lake
  - Kennedy Lake
  - Kintla Lake
  - Kootenai Lakes
  - Lake Ellen Wilson
  - Lake Evangeline
  - Lake Frances
  - Lake Isabel
  - Lake Josephine (Montana)
  - Lake McDonald
  - Lake Nooney
  - Lake of the Seven Winds
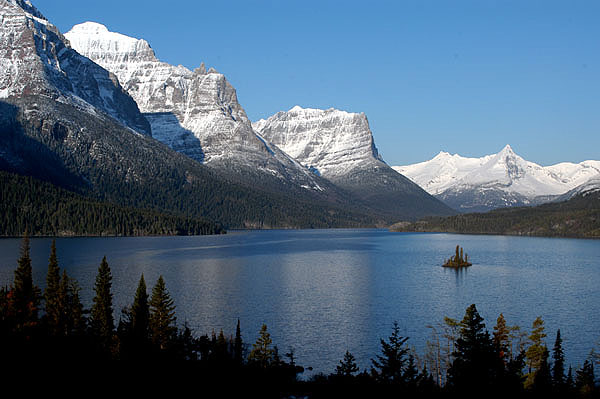
    Saint Mary Lake
  - Lake Sherburne
  - Lake Wurdeman
  - Lena Lake
  - Lincoln Lake
  - Logging Lake
  - Lonely Lakes
  - Lower Quartz Lake
  - Lower Two Medicine Lake
  - Margaret Lake
  - Medicine Grizzly Lake
  - Medicine Owl Lake
  - Miche Wabun Lake
  - Middle Quartz Lake
  - Mokowanis Lake
  - Morning Star Lake
  - Nahsukin Lake
  - Natahki Lake
  - No Name Lake
  - Oldman Lake
  - Otatso Lake
  - Otokomi Lake
  - Pitamakan Lake
  - Poia Lake
  - Pray Lake
  - Ptarmigan Lake
  - Quartz Lake
  - Red Eagle Lake
  - Redhorn Lake
  - Redrock Lake
  - Rogers Lake
  - Ruger Lake
  - Running Crane Lake
  - Saint Mary Lake
  - Shaheeya Lake
  - Slide Lake
  - Snow Moon Lake
  - Snyder Lake
  - Stoney Indian Lake
  - Striped Elk Lake
  - Sue Lake
  - Swiftcurrent Lake
  - Three Bears Lake
  - Trout Lake
  - Twin Lakes
  - Two Medicine Lake
  - Upper Grinnell Lake
  - Upper Snyder Lake
  - Upper Two Medicine Lake
  - Wahseeja Lake
  - Whitecrow Lake
  - Windmaker Lake
  - Young Man Lake
- Mountains
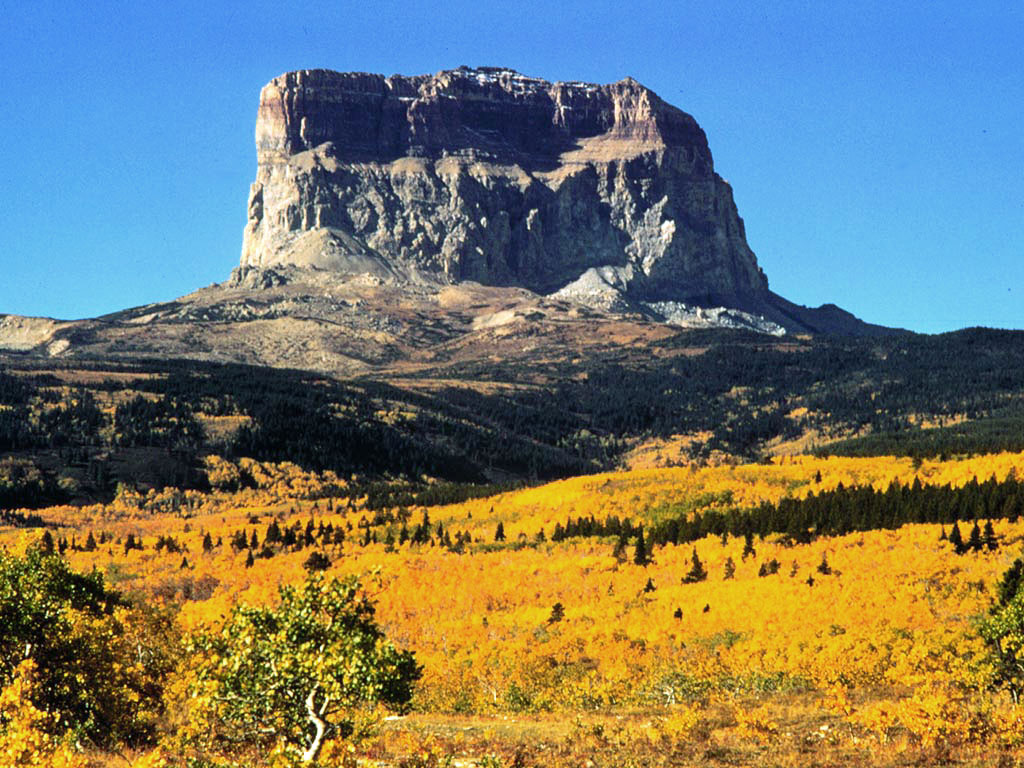
  Chief Mountain
  - Ahern Peak
  - Allen Mountain
  - Almost-a-Dog Mountain
  - Amphitheater Mountain
  - Anaconda Peak
  - Apikuni Mountain
  - Appistoki Peak
  - Bad Marriage Mountain
  - Battlement Mountain
  - Bear Mountain
  - Bearhat Mountain
  - Bearhead Mountain
  - Bishops Cap
  - Blackfoot Mountain
  - Boulder Peak
  - Brave Dog Mountain
  - Campbell Mountain
  - Caper Peak
  - Cathedral Peak
  - Chapman Peak
  - Church Butte
  - Chief Mountain
  - Citadel Mountain
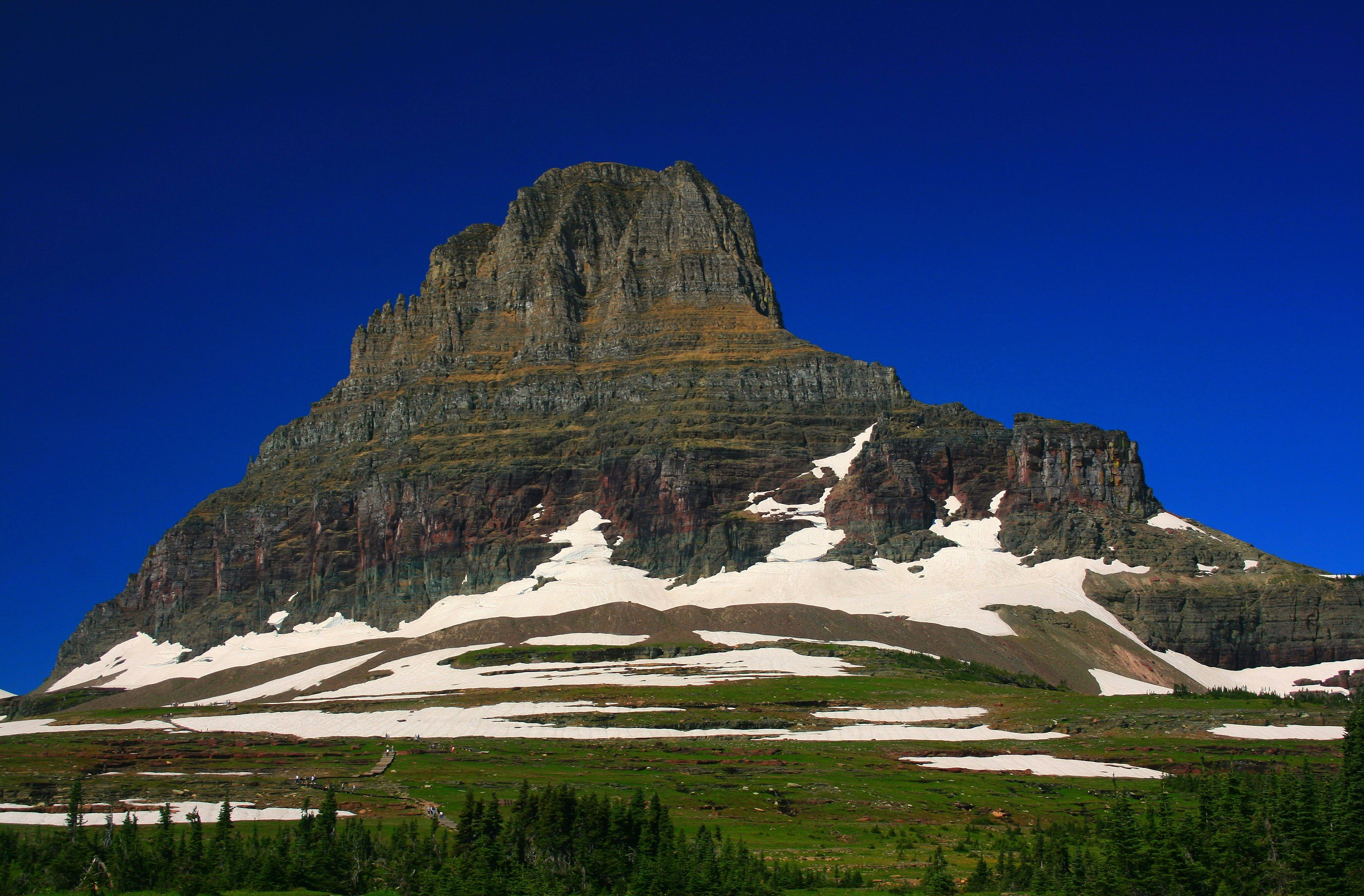
    Clements Mountain
  - Clements Mountain
  - Cloudcroft Peaks
  - Cracker Peak
  - Crowfeet Mountain
  - Curly Bear Mountain
  - Divide Mountain
  - Eagle Plume Mountain
  - Eagle Ribs Mountain
  - Eaglehead Mountain
  - East Flattop Mountain
  - Edwards Mountain
  - Flinsch Peak
  - Fusillade Mountain
  - Gable Mountain
  - Goat Haunt Mountain
  - Goat Mountain
  - Going-to-the-Sun Mountain
  - Grizzly Mountain
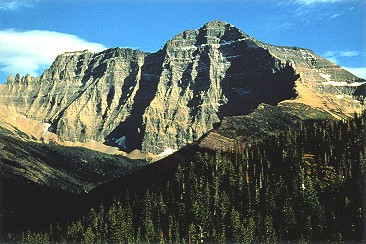
    Mount Cleveland, the tallest peak in the Park
  - Gunsight Mountain
  - Heavens Peak
  - Iceberg Peak
  - Ipasha Peak
  - Kaina Mountain
  - Kinnerly Peak
  - Kintla Peak
  - Kootenai Peak
  - Kupunkamint Mountain
  - Lewis Range
  - Little Chief Mountain
  - Little Dog Mountain
  - Livingston Range
  - Logging Mountain
  - Lone Walker Mountain
  - Long Knife Peak
  - Longfellow Peak
  - Mad Wolf Mountain
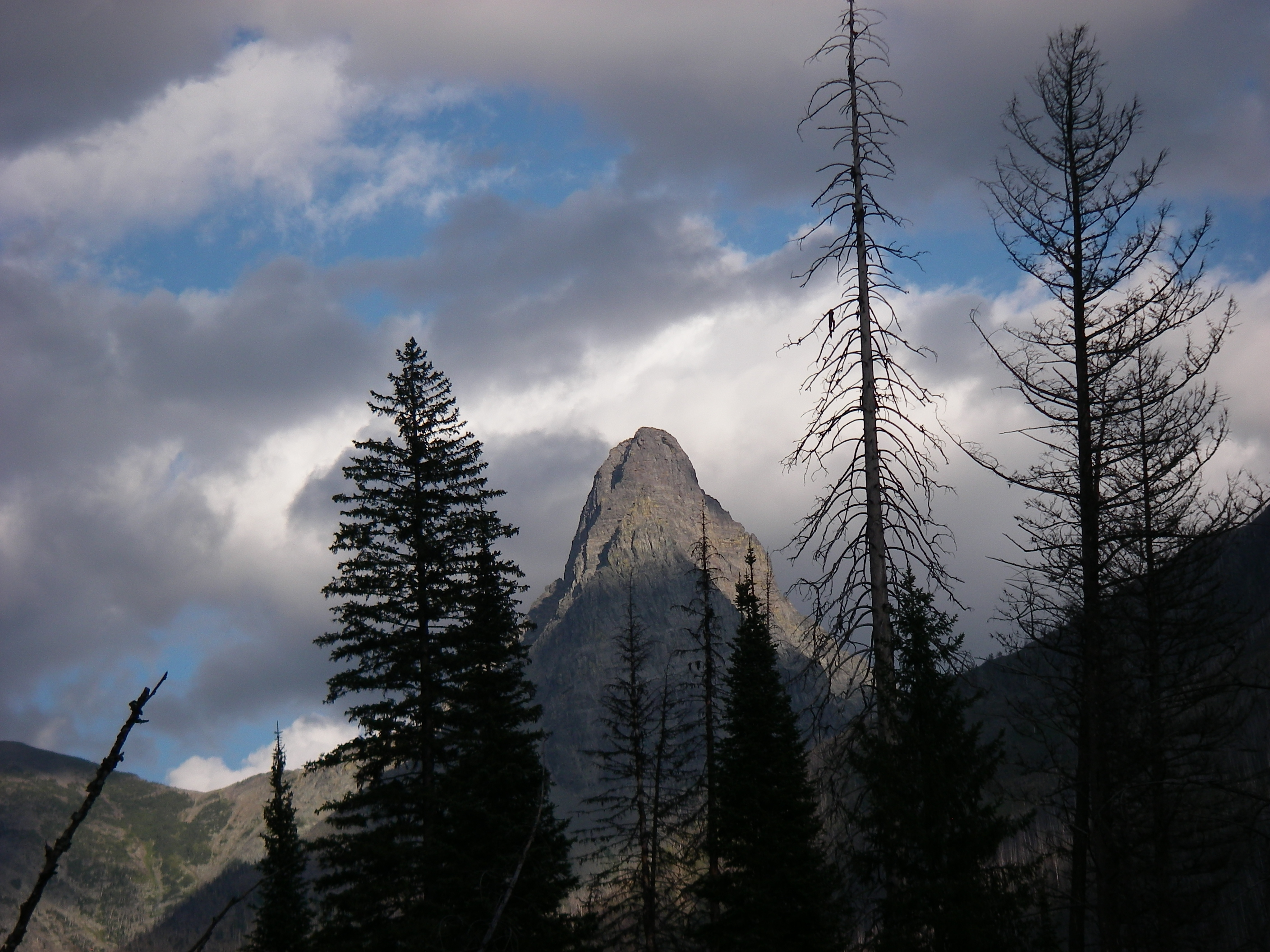
    Mount Saint Nicholas
  - Mahtotopa Mountain
  - Matahpi Peak
  - McClintock Peak
  - McPartland Mountain
  - Medicine Grizzly Peak
  - Medicine Owl Peak
  - Miche Wabun Peak
  - Mount Cleveland
  - Mount Brown
  - Mount Cannon
  - Mount Carter
  - Mount Custer
  - Mount Despair
  - Mount Doody
  - Mount Ellsworth
  - Mount Geduhn
  - Mount Gould
  - Mount Grinnell
  - Mount Helen
  - Mount Henkel
  - Mount Henry
  - Mount Jackson
  - Mount James
  - Mount Kipp
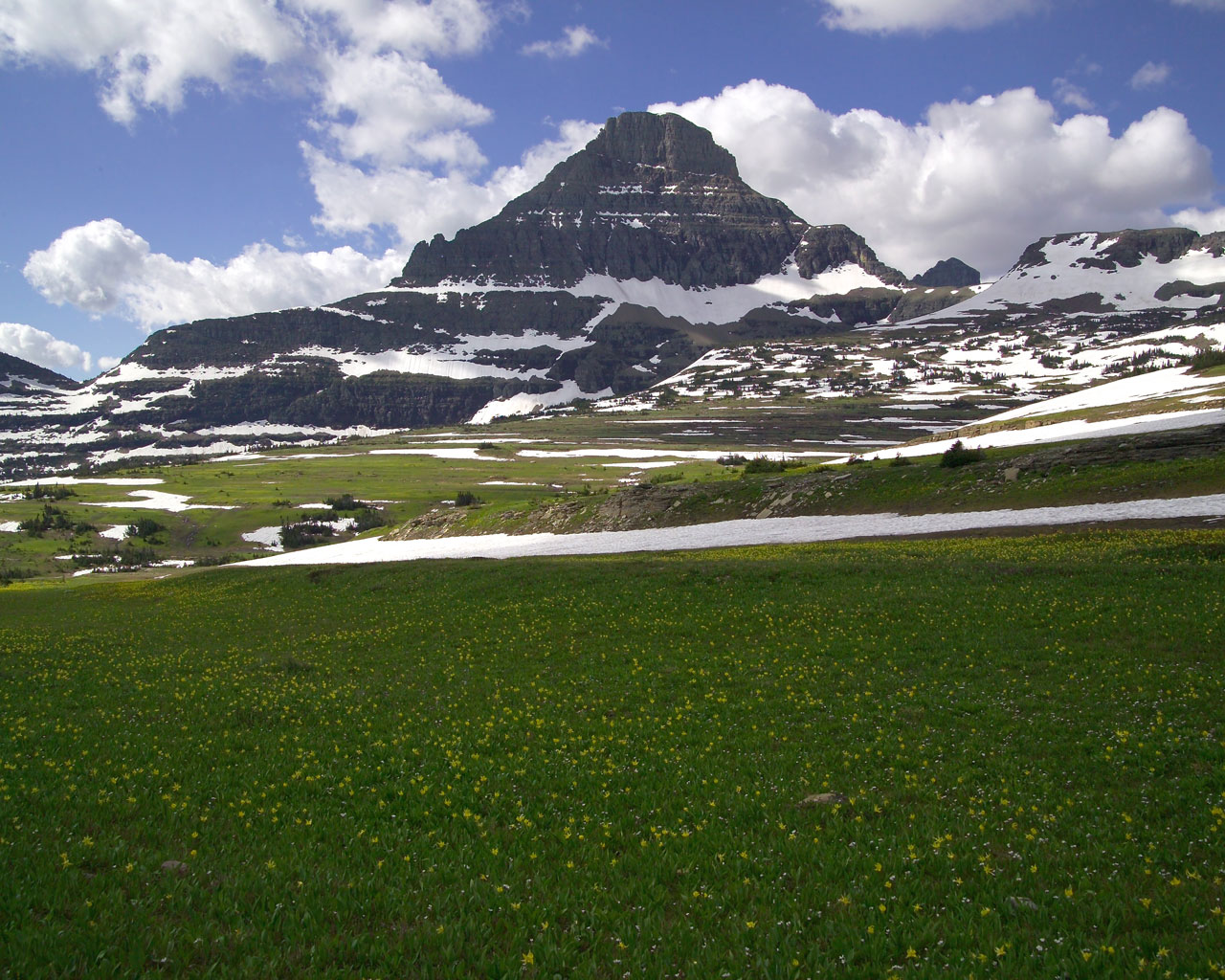
    Mount Reynolds
  - Mount Logan
  - Mount Merritt
  - Mount Morgan
  - Mount Oberlin
  - Mount Peabody
  - Mount Phillips
  - Mount Pinchot
  - Mount Rockwell
  - Mount Saint Nicholas
  - Mount Siyeh
  - Mount Stimson
  - Mount Thompson
  - Mount Vaught
  - Mount Wilbur
  - Nahsukin Mountain
  - Natoas Peak
  - Norris Mountain
  - Numa Peak
  - Parke Peak
  - Paul Bunyans Cabin
  - Peril Peak
  - Piegan Mountain
  - Pollock Mountain
  - Pyramid Peak
  - Rainbow Peak
  - Razoredge Mountain
  - Red Eagle Mountain
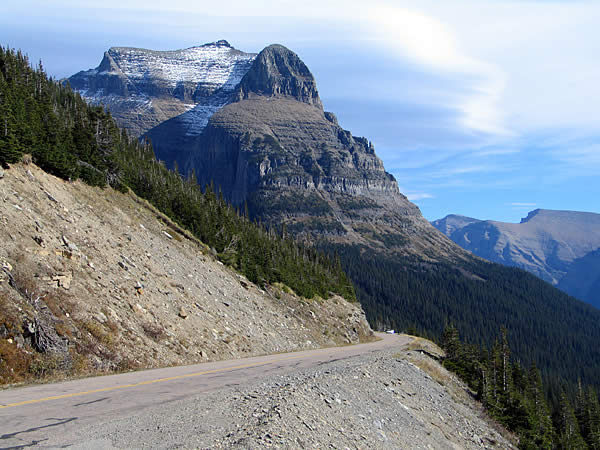
    Going-to-the-Sun Mountain
  - Red Mountain
  - Redhorn Peak
  - Reuter Peak
  - Reynolds Mountain
  - Rising Wolf Mountain
  - Sarcee Mountain
  - Seward Mountain
  - Shaheeya Peak
  - Sheep Mountain
  - Sherburne Peak
  - Sinopah Mountain
  - Split Mountain
  - Square Peak
  - Stoney Indian Peaks
  - Summit Mountain
  - Swiftcurrent Mountain
  - The Guardhouse
  - Thunderbird Mountain
  - Tinkham Mountain
  - Triple Divide Peak
  - Vigil Peak
  - Vulture Peak
  - Wahcheechee Mountain
  - Walton Mountain
  - White Calf Mountain
  - Wolftail Mountain
  - Wynn Mountain
  - Yellow Mountain
- Rivers
  - Middle Fork Flathead River
  - North Fork Flathead River
- Waterfalls
  - Bird Woman Falls
  - Weeping Wall
- Specific areas
  - Iceberg Cirque
  - Two Medicine
- Roads and passes
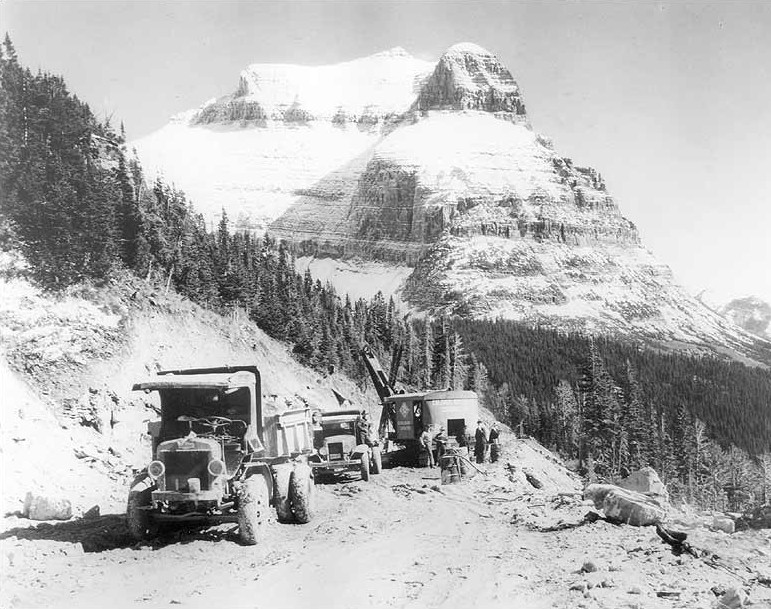
  Going to the Sun Road, 1932
  - Big Drift
  - Going-to-the-Sun Road
  - Logan Pass
  - Marias Pass

== Geology ==
- Geologic formations
  - Appekunny Formation
  - Lewis Overthrust
  - Belt Supergroup

== Fauna ==
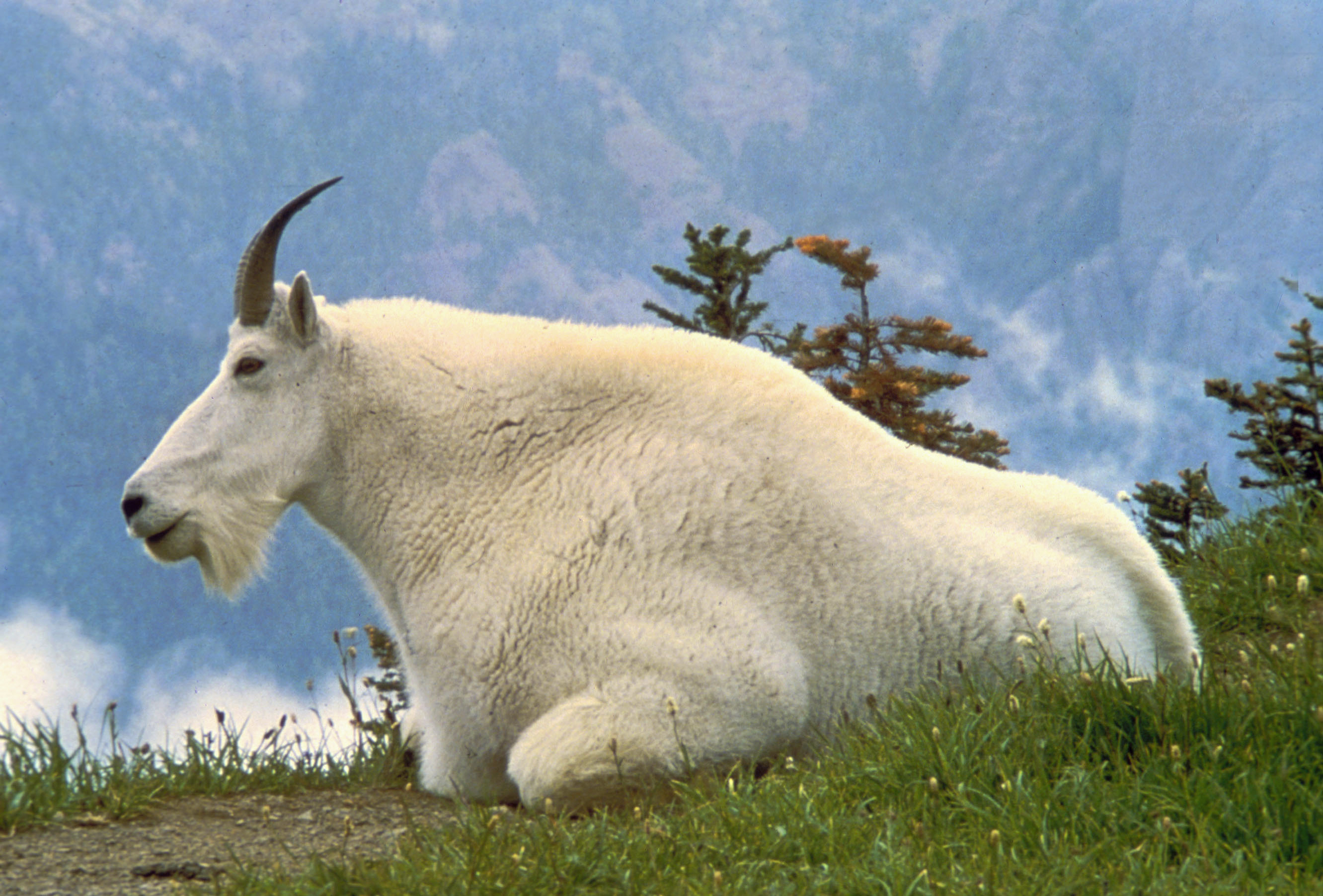
Mountain goat

- Bighorn sheep
- Canadian lynx
- Grizzly bear
- Elk
- Gray wolf
- Leopold Report - Seminal 1963 Study: "Wildlife Management In The National Parks"
- Mountain goat

== Districts and structures ==
- Districts
  - Belly River Ranger Station Historic District
  - Cut Bank Ranger Station Historic District
  - East Glacier Ranger Station Historic District
  - Great Northern Railway Buildings
  - Headquarters Historic District
  - Kintla Lake Ranger Station
  - Kishenehn Ranger Station Historic District
  - Logging Creek Ranger Station Historic District
  - Many Glacier
  - Nyack Ranger Station Historic District
  - Polebridge Ranger Station Historic District
  - Saint Mary Ranger Station
  - St. Mary Utility Area Historic District
  - Sherburne Ranger Station Historic District
  - Swiftcurrent Auto Camp Historic District
  - Swiftcurrent Ranger Station Historic District
  - Upper Lake McDonald Ranger Station Historic District
  - Walton Ranger Station Historic District

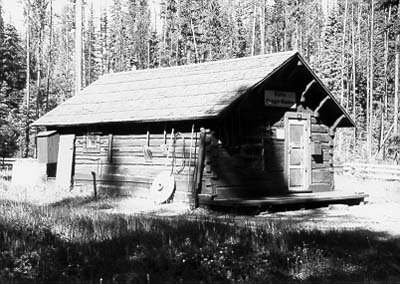
Kintla Lake Ranger Station

- Historic Structures, Hotels and Lodges
  - Belton Chalets
  - Glacier Park Lodge
  - Granite Park Chalet
  - Gunsight Pass Shelter
  - Lake McDonald Lodge
  - Logan Pass Visitor Center
  - Many Glacier Barn and Bunkhouse
  - Many Glacier Hotel
  - Rising Sun Auto Camp
  - Roes Creek Campground Camptender's Cabin
  - Sperry Chalet
  - Swanson Boathouse
  - Two Medicine Campground Camptender's Cabin
  - Two Medicine Store
  - West Entrance Station
- Fire lookouts
  - Apgar Fire Lookout
  - Heaven's Peak Fire Lookout
  - Huckleberry Fire Lookout
  - Loneman Fire Lookout
  - Mount Brown Fire Lookout
  - Numa Ridge Fire Lookout
  - Scalplock Mountain Fire Lookout
  - Swiftcurrent Fire Lookout

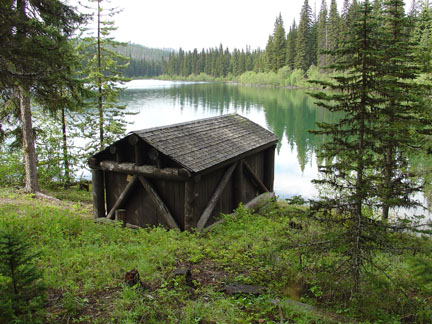
Logging Lake Boathouse

- Ranger patrol cabins
  - Bowman Lake Patrol Cabin
  - Coal Creek Patrol Cabin
  - Ford Creek Patrol Cabin
  - Goathaunt Bunkhouse
  - Kootenai Creek Snowshoe Cabin
  - Lee Creek Snowshoe Cabin
  - Logan Creek Patrol Cabin
  - Lower Logging Lake Snowshoe Cabin and Boathouse
  - Lower Nyack Snowshoe Cabin
  - Lower Park Creek Patrol Cabin
  - Pass Creek Snowshoe Cabin
  - Quartz Lake Patrol Cabin
  - Slide Lake-Otatso Creek Patrol Cabin and Woodshed
  - Sun Camp Fireguard Cabin
  - Upper Kintla Lake Patrol Cabin
  - Upper Logging Lake Snowshoe Cabin
  - Upper Nyack Snowshoe Cabin
  - Upper Park Creek Patrol Cabin
- Other structures
  - Glacier View Dam (never built)
  - Lake Sherburne Dam
  - Saint Mary Visitor Center, Entrance Station and Checking Stations

== Recreation ==
- Continental Divide Trail
- Glacier National Park Tourist Trails--Inside Trail, South Circle, North Circle
- Highline Trail (Glacier National Park)
- Ptarmigan Tunnel
- Trail of the Cedars

== Trivia ==
- Polebridge to Numa Ridge Phoneline

== Entrance Communities ==
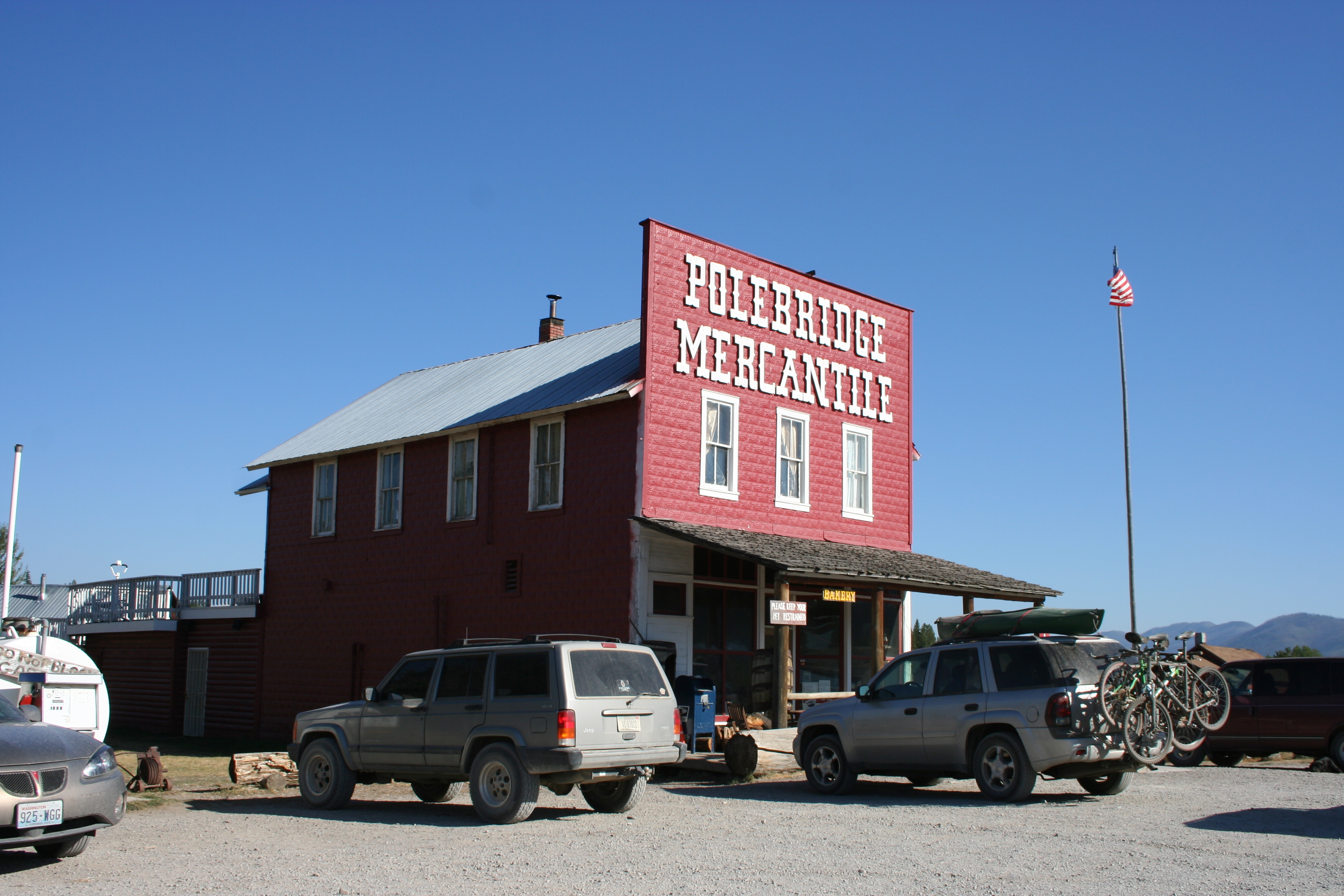
Polebridge, Montana

- Apgar Village
- Babb, Montana
- Blackfeet Indian Reservation
- Browning, Montana
- Columbia Falls, Montana
- Coram, Montana
- East Glacier Park Village, Montana
- Hungry Horse, Montana
- Kalispell, Montana - Closest commercial airport to Glacier
- Polebridge, Montana
- Rising Sun (Montana)
- St. Mary, Montana
- West Glacier, Montana
- Highways
  - U.S. Route 2
  - U.S. Route 89

== See also ==
- Bibliography of Glacier National Park (U.S.)
