= Boy Lake =

Boy Lake may refer to one of the following places in the United States:

- Boy Lake (Cass County, Minnesota)
- Boy Lake Township, Cass County, Minnesota
- Boy Lake (Glacier County, Montana), a lake in Glacier National Park (U.S.)
