= Redhorn =

Redhorn may mean:

- Red Horn (Siouan deity)
- Caradhras, a fictional location: a great peak in the Misty Mountains in The Lord of the Rings
  - Redhorn Pass over the Misty Mountains in The Lord of the Rings
- Redhorn Lake, in Glacier National Park, in the USA state of Montana
- Redhorn Peak (8,113 feet (2,473 m)), located in the Livingston Range, Glacier National Park in the USA state of Montana
