= List of lakes of Glacier County, Montana =

There are at least 118 named lakes and reservoirs in Glacier County, Montana.

== Lakes ==
- Alkali Lake, 48°53′40″N 112°12′40″W, el. 3,999 feet (1,219 m)
- Allison Lake, 48°40′23″N 112°23′48″W, el. 3,747 feet (1,142 m)
- Atsina Lake, 48°52′30″N 113°50′36″W, el. 5,791 feet (1,765 m)
- Aubery Lake, 48°35′10″N 112°56′56″W, el. 4,258 feet (1,298 m)
- Bench Lake, 48°52′57″N 113°56′16″W, el. 6,785 feet (2,068 m)
- Big Spring Lake, 48°24′41″N 113°09′15″W, el. 4,639 feet (1,414 m)
- Boundary Lake, 48°59′50″N 112°26′48″W, el. 4,012 feet (1,223 m)
- Boy Lake, 48°30′06″N 113°26′23″W, el. 6,335 feet (1,931 m)
- Buffalo Lake, 48°51′30″N 112°44′09″W, el. 4,065 feet (1,239 m)
- Buffalo Lakes, 48°23′24″N 113°14′07″W, el. 5,374 feet (1,638 m)
- Bullhead Lake, 48°47′10″N 113°44′04″W, el. 5,184 feet (1,580 m)
- Cameron Lake, 48°59′52″N 114°03′19″W, el. 5,449 feet (1,661 m)
- Carcajou Lake, 48°58′13″N 113°59′27″W, el. 5,636 feet (1,718 m)
- Carlow Lake, 48°36′42″N 112°37′26″W, el. 4,032 feet (1,229 m)
- Cobalt Lake, 48°26′04″N 113°25′34″W, el. 6,575 feet (2,004 m)
- Conway Lake, 48°39′49″N 112°27′35″W, el. 3,917 feet (1,194 m)
- Cosley Lake, 48°55′25″N 113°45′31″W, el. 4,846 feet (1,477 m)
- Cracker Lake, 48°44′40″N 113°38′35″W, el. 5,915 feet (1,803 m)
- Croffs Lake, 48°55′27″N 112°47′29″W, el. 4,081 feet (1,244 m)
- Dog Gun Lake, 48°21′41″N 113°07′28″W, el. 5,187 feet (1,581 m)
- Duck Lake, 48°52′17″N 113°19′56″W, el. 5,026 feet (1,532 m)
- Elizabeth Lake, 48°52′56″N 113°38′32″W, el. 7,867 feet (2,398 m)
- Falling Leaf Lake, 48°46′38″N 113°38′38″W, el. 6,637 feet (2,023 m)
- Fishercap Lake, 48°47′52″N 113°41′07″W, el. 4,944 feet (1,507 m)
- Flatton Lake, 48°47′20″N 113°27′29″W, el. 5,663 feet (1,726 m)
- Four Horns Lake, 48°21′00″N 112°42′44″W, el. 4,114 feet (1,254 m)
- Glenns Lake, 48°54′12″N 113°47′33″W, el. 4,865 feet (1,483 m)
- Goat Haunt Lake, 48°57′34″N 113°51′25″W, el. 5,987 feet (1,825 m)
- Goat Lake, 48°41′59″N 113°34′40″W, el. 6,463 feet (1,970 m)
- Goose Lake, 48°54′07″N 113°20′17″W, el. 5,177 feet (1,578 m)
- Governor Pond, 48°47′39″N 113°39′08″W, el. 4,879 feet (1,487 m)
- Grassy Lake, 48°52′27″N 112°12′31″W, el. 3,980 feet (1,210 m)
- Green Lake, 48°23′18″N 113°17′18″W, el. 5,180 feet (1,580 m)
- Grinnell Lake, 48°45′58″N 113°42′15″W, el. 4,944 feet (1,507 m)
- Guardipee Lake, 48°33′29″N 112°43′23″W, el. 4,049 feet (1,234 m)
- Gunsight Lake, 48°37′24″N 113°43′12″W, el. 5,351 feet (1,631 m)
- Hay Lake, 48°48′30″N 112°13′49″W, el. 4,055 feet (1,236 m)
- Helen Lake, 48°50′16″N 113°45′24″W, el. 5,089 feet (1,551 m)
- Hidden Lake, 48°37′17″N 113°06′33″W, el. 4,619 feet (1,408 m)
- Hope Lake, 48°39′44″N 112°25′23″W, el. 3,881 feet (1,183 m)
- Horse Lake, 48°43′41″N 113°13′14″W, el. 4,846 feet (1,477 m)
- Iceberg Lake, 48°48′44″N 113°44′59″W, el. 6,099 feet (1,859 m)

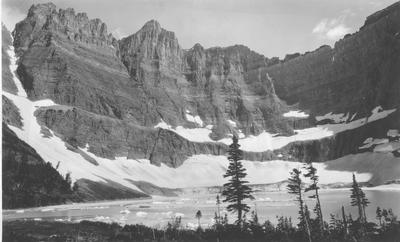
Ice Berg Lake (Ice Lake), Glacier National Park, Montana. Photo by T. J. Hileman. Part of James Willard Schultz Photos and Personal Papers Collection, Montana State University.

- Ipasha Lake, 48°51′10″N 113°48′24″W, el. 5,666 feet (1,727 m)
- Josephine Lake, 48°39′19″N 113°16′54″W, el. 5,174 feet (1,577 m)
- Kaina Lake, 48°56′30″N 113°48′18″W, el. 6,870 feet (2,090 m)
- Katoya Lake, 48°31′41″N 113°26′51″W, el. 6,371 feet (1,942 m)
- Kennedy Lake, 48°49′49″N 113°41′15″W, el. 6,785 feet (2,068 m)
- Kipp Lake, 48°33′38″N 112°50′57″W, el. 4,111 feet (1,253 m)
- Kootenai Lakes, 48°55′22″N 113°54′22″W, el. 4,390 feet (1,340 m)
- Lake Frances, 48°56′20″N 114°00′07″W, el. 5,259 feet (1,603 m)
- Lake Janet, 48°56′39″N 113°56′39″W, el. 4,924 feet (1,501 m)
- Lake Josephine, 48°46′49″N 113°40′35″W, el. 4,882 feet (1,488 m)
- Lake Nooney, 48°58′47″N 114°02′38″W, el. 5,505 feet (1,678 m)
- Lake Wurdeman, 48°58′43″N 114°01′19″W, el. 5,269 feet (1,606 m)
- Lena Lake, 48°24′17″N 113°20′17″W, el. 6,411 feet (1,954 m)
- Little Buffalo Lake, 48°51′11″N 112°42′58″W, el. 4,085 feet (1,245 m)
- Lonely Lakes, 48°32′23″N 113°23′27″W, el. 7,136 feet (2,175 m)
- Lost Lake, 48°40′54″N 113°34′31″W, el. 4,695 feet (1,431 m)
- Lower Saint Mary Lake, 48°47′25″N 113°25′16″W, el. 4,475 feet (1,364 m)
- Lower Two Medicine Lake, 48°29′32″N 113°15′49″W, el. 4,885 feet (1,489 m)
- Lubec Lake, 48°22′43″N 113°16′45″W, el. 5,036 feet (1,535 m)
- Lukins Lake, 48°57′15″N 112°21′33″W, el. 4,078 feet (1,243 m)
- Magee Lake, 48°28′12″N 112°57′53″W, el. 4,678 feet (1,426 m)
- Margaret Lake, 48°51′51″N 113°48′53″W, el. 5,577 feet (1,700 m)
- Medicine Grizzly Lake, 48°33′59″N 113°29′44″W, el. 5,568 feet (1,697 m)
- Medicine Owl Lake, 48°36′21″N 113°28′50″W, el. 6,811 feet (2,076 m)
- Miche Wabun Lake, 48°57′27″N 113°49′12″W, el. 5,964 feet (1,818 m)
- Minnie White Horse Lake, 48°19′17″N 113°03′02″W, el. 5,308 feet (1,618 m)
- Mirror Pond, 48°39′20″N 113°39′35″W, el. 4,623 feet (1,409 m)
- Mokowanis Lake, 48°52′45″N 113°48′53″W, el. 4,987 feet (1,520 m)
- Morning Eagle Lake, 48°24′29″N 113°11′39″W, el. 5,233 feet (1,595 m)
- Morning Star Lake, 48°32′31″N 113°27′26″W, el. 5,768 feet (1,758 m)
- Nahsukin Lake, 48°49′57″N 113°58′40″W, el. 5,413 feet (1,650 m)
- Natahki Lake, 48°49′04″N 113°40′06″W, el. 6,578 feet (2,005 m)
- No Name Lake, 48°28′46″N 113°26′51″W, el. 5,928 feet (1,807 m)
- North Lakes, 48°58′25″N 114°01′31″W, el. 5,269 feet (1,606 m)
- Oldman Lake, 48°30′44″N 113°27′38″W, el. 6,650 feet (2,030 m)
- Otatso Lake, 48°53′31″N 113°40′36″W, el. 6,975 feet (2,126 m)
- Otokomi Lake, 48°43′03″N 113°35′53″W, el. 6,486 feet (1,977 m)
- Pike Lake, 48°59′36″N 113°27′29″W, el. 4,524 feet (1,379 m)
- Pitamakan Lake, 48°31′18″N 113°27′26″W, el. 6,811 feet (2,076 m)
- Poia Lake, 48°51′06″N 113°36′26″W, el. 5,791 feet (1,765 m)
- Pray Lake, 48°29′27″N 113°21′56″W, el. 5,167 feet (1,575 m)
- Ptarmigan Lake, 48°50′40″N 113°42′40″W, el. 6,630 feet (2,020 m)
- Red Eagle Lake, 48°39′12″N 113°30′22″W, el. 4,728 feet (1,441 m)
- Redhorn Lake, 48°51′54″N 113°58′45″W, el. 6,112 feet (1,863 m)
- Redrock Lake, 48°47′45″N 113°42′22″W, el. 5,082 feet (1,549 m)
- Running Crane Lake, 48°32′32″N 113°25′14″W, el. 7,356 feet (2,242 m)
- Saint Mary Lake, 48°41′42″N 113°29′59″W, el. 4,488 feet (1,368 m)
- Lake of the Seven Winds (aka Seven Winds of the Lake),48°31′24″N 113°27′54″W, el. 6,975 feet (2,126 m)
- Shaheeya Lake, 48°57′22″N 113°57′32″W, el. 7,073 feet (2,156 m)
- Sharp Lake, 48°40′42″N 112°55′57″W, el. 4,199 feet (1,280 m)
- Sky Lake, 48°30′01″N 113°22′40″W, el. 7,018 feet (2,139 m)
- Slide Lake, 48°54′07″N 113°37′28″W, el. 6,033 feet (1,839 m)
- Snow Moon Lake, 48°46′28″N 113°38′54″W, el. 6,663 feet (2,031 m)
- Spider Lake, 48°56′39″N 113°20′16″W, el. 4,439 feet (1,353 m)
- Stoney Indian Lake, 48°53′10″N 113°51′58″W, el. 6,329 feet (1,929 m)
- Stump Lake, 48°47′08″N 113°39′54″W, el. 4,882 feet (1,488 m)
- Sue Lake, 48°51′39″N 113°50′46″W, el. 7,149 feet (2,179 m)
- Swiftcurrent Lake, 48°47′43″N 113°39′41″W, el. 4,882 feet (1,488 m)
- Swiftcurrent Ridge Lake, 48°50′24″N 113°35′06″W, el. 6,096 feet (1,858 m)
- Three Bears Lake, 48°19′29″N 113°21′50″W, el. 5,285 feet (1,611 m)
- Toad Lake, 48°44′37″N 113°13′01″W, el. 4,826 feet (1,471 m)
- Twin Lakes, 48°18′57″N 112°54′42″W, el. 4,462 feet (1,360 m)
- Twin Lakes, 48°38′58″N 113°43′05″W, el. 5,863 feet (1,787 m)
- Two Medicine Lake, 48°28′37″N 113°23′15″W, el. 5,167 feet (1,575 m)
- Upper Grinnell Lake, 48°45′33″N 113°43′57″W, el. 6,463 feet (1,970 m)
- Upper Mission Lake, 48°31′49″N 112°40′52″W, el. 3,970 feet (1,210 m)
- Upper Two Medicine Lake, 48°27′50″N 113°27′43″W, el. 5,403 feet (1,647 m)
- Upper Waterton Lake, 49°03′00″N 113°54′03″W, el. 0 feet (0 m)
- Wahseeja Lake, 48°57′33″N 113°58′55″W, el. 6,844 feet (2,086 m)
- Whitecrow Lake, 48°54′01″N 113°49′55″W, el. 6,152 feet (1,875 m)
- Windmaker Lake, 48°47′23″N 113°44′45″W, el. 5,325 feet (1,623 m)
- Young Man Lake, 48°30′00″N 113°27′07″W, el. 6,913 feet (2,107 m)

== Reservoirs ==
- Four Horns Lake, 48°20′36″N 112°41′45″W, el. 4,124 feet (1,257 m)
- Kipps Lake, 48°34′00″N 112°50′45″W, el. 4,111 feet (1,253 m)
- Lake Sherburne, 48°49′42″N 113°31′16″W, el. 4,803 feet (1,464 m)
- Lower Two Medicine Reservoir, 48°29′36″N 113°16′03″W, el. 4,888 feet (1,490 m)
- Mission Lake, 48°33′58″N 112°35′56″W, el. 3,960 feet (1,210 m)

== See also ==
- List of lakes in Montana
