= Lena Lake =

Lena Lake may refer to:

- Lena Lake (Kenora District), Ontario
- Lena Lake (Muskoka District), Ontario
- Lena Lake (Nipissing District), Ontario
- Lena Lake (Algoma District), Ontario
- Lena Lake (Thunder Bay District), Ontario
- Lena Lake (Glacier County, Montana), in Glacier National Park (U.S.)
- Lena Lake (Missoula County, Montana)
- Lena Lake (Powell County, Montana)
- Lena Lake (Olympic National Forest)
