= Carcajou =

Carcajou is an alternative common name for the wolverine, Gulo gulo. It may also refer to:

== Places ==
Canada

- Carcajou, Alberta, an unincorporated community
- Carcajou Pass a mountain pass
- Carcajou Peak, a mountain in British Columbia

United States

- Carcajou, Wisconsin, an unincorporated community
- Carcajou Lake, a lake in Montana

== Culture ==
- Carcajou et le péril blanc, a 1970s Canadian documentary film series
