= Atsina (disambiguation) =

Atsina refers to the Gros Ventre people. It may also mean:

- Atsina Lake, a lake in Montana
- The Hidatsa tribe, doesn't mean "Gros Ventres of Missouri"
- Atsina (dance), a traditional dance from Togo
