= Young Man Lake =

Lake in the American state of Montana

- Location within Montana Location within the United States
- Location: Glacier National Park, Glacier County, Montana, US
- Coordinates: 48°30′00″N 113°27′07″W
- Type: Natural
- Primary outflows: Dry Fork
- Basin countries: United States
- Max. length: .35 miles (0.56 km)
- Max. width: .15 miles (0.24 km)
- Surface elevation: 6,913 ft (2,107 m)

Young Man Lake is located in Glacier National Park, in the U. S. state of Montana. Young Man Lake is in a cirque and hanging valley immediately east of Flinsch Peak. A series of waterfalls carries waters from the lake to nearby Boy Lake. Though the Pitamakan Pass Trail, which is also part of the Continental Divide Trail, passes just north of Young Man Lake, there are no designated trails to the lake itself. The lake is difficult to access and consequently named because only a "young man" might have the ability to reach the lake.

An airplane wreckage was discovered at the lake on July 28, 1976, by another aircraft; some of the wreck had slid into the lake. Recovery crew identified the plane as having disappeared on November 1, 1975, with two Idaho residents on board.

== See also ==
- List of lakes in Glacier County, Montana
