= Windmaker Lake =

Lake in Glacier County, Montana

- Location within Montana Location within the United States
- Location: Glacier National Park, Glacier County, Montana, US
- Coordinates: 48°47′23″N 113°44′45″W
- Type: Natural
- Primary outflows: Swiftcurrent Creek
- Basin countries: United States
- Max. length: .25 miles (0.40 km)
- Max. width: .15 miles (0.24 km)
- Surface elevation: 5,325 ft (1,623 m)

Windmaker Lake is located in Glacier National Park, in the U. S. state of Montana. Swiftcurrent Mountain is west and Mount Wilbur is north of the lake. Unnamed creeks and the melt from the North Swiftcurrent Glacier feed the lake. Windmaker Lake can be reached by way of the Swiftcurrent Pass Trail.

== See also ==
- List of lakes in Glacier County, Montana
