= Bench Lake (Glacier County, Montana) =

Lake in Montana, United States

- Location within Montana Location within the United States
- Location: Glacier National Park, Glacier County, Montana, US
- Coordinates: 48°52′57″N 113°56′16″W
- Type: Natural
- Primary outflows: Waterton River
- Basin countries: United States
- Max. length: .30 mi (0.48 km)
- Max. width: .28 mi (0.45 km)
- Surface elevation: 6,780 ft (2,070 m)

Bench Lake is located in Glacier National Park, in the U. S. state of Montana. Bench Lake is south of Kootenai Peak.

== See also ==
- List of lakes in Glacier County, Montana
