= Miche Wabun Lake =

Lake in the American state of Montana

- Location within Montana Location within the United States
- Location: Glacier National Park, Glacier County, Montana, US
- Coordinates: 48°57′27″N 113°49′12″W
- Type: Natural
- Primary outflows: North Fork Belly River River
- Basin countries: United States
- Max. length: .70 miles (1.13 km)
- Max. width: .20 miles (0.32 km)
- Surface elevation: 5,964 ft (1,818 m)

Miche Wabun Lake is located in Glacier National Park, in the U. S. state of Montana. Runoff from the Miche Wabun Glacier and other icefields feed the lake after cascading over Miche Wabun Falls. Miche Wabun Lake is at the head of the North Fork Belly River and is surrounded by Kaina Mountain to the east, Miche Wabun Peak to the north and Goat Haunt Mountain to the southwest.

== See also ==
- List of lakes in Glacier County, Montana
