= Kootenai Lakes =

Lakes in Montana, United States

- Kootenai Lakes as seen from the north end. Looking SSW. Kootenai Peak in the center.

- Location within Montana Location within the United States
- Location: Glacier National Park, Glacier County, Montana, US
- Coordinates: 48°55′20.02″N 113°54′21.96″W
- Lake type: Natural
- Primary outflows: Waterton River
- Basin countries: United States
- Max. length: .26 mi (0.42 km)
- Max. width: .18 mi (0.29 km)
- Surface elevation: 4,390 ft (1,340 m)

Kootenai Lakes are in Glacier National Park, in the U. S. state of Montana. The Kootenai Lakes are in the Waterton Valley in the north central section of Glacier National Park. It is commonly recognized for its trail, Kootenai Lakes Trail. It is a 5.5 mile lightly trafficked out and back trail near Babb, Montana that features one of the Kootenai lakes and is good for all skill levels. The trail is primarily used for hiking, walking, nature trips, and fishing and is best used from April until October.

== See also ==
- List of lakes in Glacier County, Montana
