= Nahsukin Lake =

Lake in Glacier County, Montana, United States

- Location within Montana Location within the United States
- Location: Glacier National Park, Glacier County, Montana, US
- Coordinates: 48°49′57″N 113°58′40″W
- Type: Natural
- Primary outflows: Waterton River
- Basin countries: United States
- Max. length: .30 mi (0.48 km)
- Max. width: .28 mi (0.45 km)
- Surface elevation: 5,410 ft (1,650 m)

Nahsukin Lake is located in Glacier National Park, in the U. S. state of Montana. Nahsukin Lake is southeast of Nahsukin Mountain.

"Nahsukin" is a Kootenai word for chief.

== See also ==
- List of lakes in Glacier County, Montana
