= Poia Lake =

Lake in Glacier County, Montana, United States

- Looking west

- Location within Montana Location within the United States
- Location: Glacier National Park, Glacier County, Montana, US
- Coordinates: 48°51′06″N 113°36′26″W
- Type: Natural
- Primary inflows: Kennedy Creek
- Primary outflows: Kennedy Creek
- Basin countries: United States
- Max. length: .30 miles (0.48 km)
- Max. width: .20 miles (0.32 km)
- Surface elevation: 5,785 ft (1,763 m)

Poia Lake is located in Glacier National Park, in the U. S. state of Montana. Poia Lake is 2.5 miles (4.0 km) northwest of Lake Sherburne.

== See also ==
- List of lakes in Glacier County, Montana
