= Running Crane Lake =

Lake in Montana, United States

- Location within Montana Location within the United States
- Location: Glacier National Park, Glacier County, Montana, US
- Coordinates: 48°32′32″N 113°25′14″W
- Type: Natural
- Primary outflows: Lake Creek
- Basin countries: United States
- Max. length: .25 miles (0.40 km)
- Max. width: .15 miles (0.24 km)
- Surface elevation: 7,350 ft (2,240 m)

Running Crane Lake is located in Glacier National Park, in the U.S. state of Montana. Red Mountain is south of the lake, while Eagle Plume Mountain is to the north.

== See also ==
- List of lakes in Glacier County, Montana
