= Upper Grinnell Lake =

Lake in Glacier County, Montana

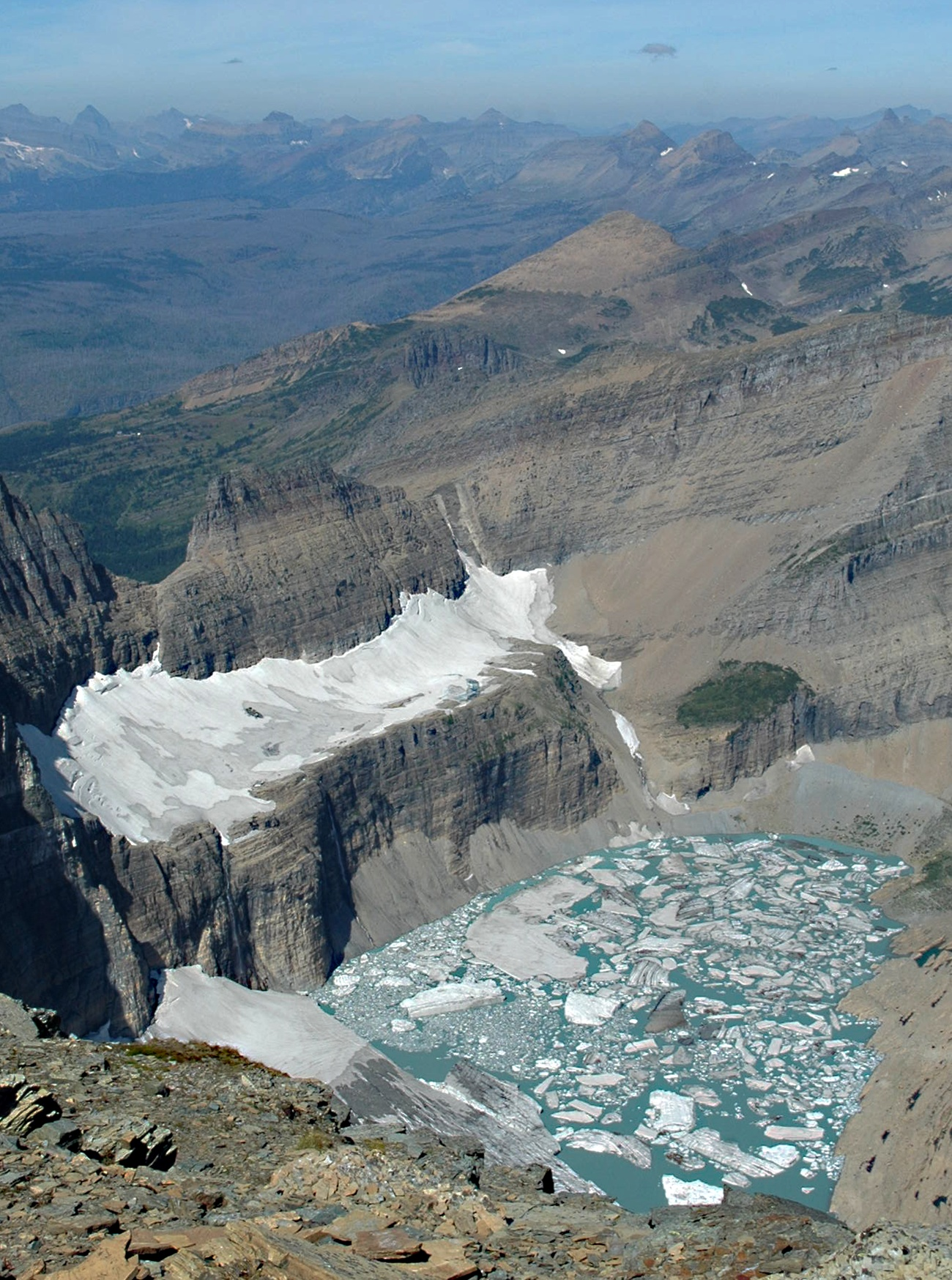
- Ice clogged Upper Grinnell Lake in 2009. Grinnell Glacier is at lower left and The Salamander Glacier is above the lake at center left

- Location within Montana Location within the United States
- Location: Glacier National Park, Glacier County, Montana, US
- Coordinates: 48°45′33″N 113°43′57″W
- Type: Natural
- Primary outflows: Grinnell Creek
- Basin countries: United States
- Max. length: .60 miles (0.97 km)
- Max. width: .20 miles (0.32 km)
- Surface elevation: 6,463 ft (1,970 m)

Upper Grinnell Lake is located in Glacier National Park, in the U. S. state of Montana. Upper Grinnell Lake is a proglacial lake which formed in the 1930s as Grinnell Glacier retreated. The lake is often filled with small icebergs which have been breaking off Grinnell Glacier. Upper Grinnell Lake can be reached by trail and is a 5.5 miles (8.9 km) hike from the Many Glacier Hotel.

== See also ==
- List of lakes in Glacier County, Montana
