= Snow Moon Lake =

Lake in the American state of Montana

- Location within Montana Location within the United States
- Location: Glacier National Park, Glacier County, Montana, US
- Coordinates: 48°46′28″N 113°38′54″W
- Type: Natural
- Basin countries: United States
- Max. length: .20 miles (0.32 km)
- Max. width: .15 miles (0.24 km)
- Surface elevation: 6,663 ft (2,031 m)

Snow Moon Lake is located in Glacier National Park, in the U. S. state of Montana. The lake is in a cirque to the north of Allen Mountain and adjacent to Falling Leaf Lake.

== See also ==
- List of lakes in Glacier County, Montana
