= Morning Star Lake (Glacier County, Montana) =

Lake in Montana, United States

- Location within Montana Location within the United States
- Location: Glacier National Park, Glacier County, Montana, US
- Coordinates: 48°32′31″N 113°27′26″W
- Type: Natural
- Primary inflows: North Fork Cut Bank Creek
- Primary outflows: North Fork Cut Bank Creek
- Basin countries: United States
- Max. length: .20 miles (0.32 km)
- Max. width: .10 miles (0.16 km)
- Surface elevation: 5,763 ft (1,757 m)

Morning Star Lake is located in Glacier National Park, in the U. S. state of Montana. The lake is situated along the North Fork Cut Bank Creek drainage.

== See also ==
- List of lakes in Glacier County, Montana
