= Twin Lakes (Glacier National Park) =

Lakes in Glacier National Park in Montana, United States

- Location within Montana Location within the United States
- Location: Glacier National Park, Glacier County, Montana, US
- Coordinates: 48°38′58″N 113°43′05″W
- Type: Natural
- Basin countries: United States
- Max. length: .30 miles (0.48 km)
- Max. width: .20 miles (0.32 km)
- Surface elevation: 5,870 ft (1,790 m)

Twin Lakes are located in Glacier National Park, in the U. S. state of Montana. Fusillade Mountain rises to the south above the lakes. A spur off the Gunsight Pass Trail leads to Florence Falls which are below the Twin Lakes.

== See also ==
- List of lakes in Glacier County, Montana
