= No Name Lake =

Lake in the American state of Montana

- Location within Montana Location within the United States
- Location: Glacier National Park, Glacier County, Montana, US
- Coordinates: 48°28′45″N 113°26′51″W
- Type: Natural
- Basin countries: United States
- Max. length: .16 miles (0.26 km)
- Max. width: .12 miles (0.19 km)
- Surface elevation: 5,925 ft (1,806 m)

No Name Lake is located in Glacier National Park, in the U. S. state of Montana. The lake is just north of Pumpelly Pillar in the Two Medicine region of Glacier National Park. No Name Lake is a 5 miles (8.0 km) hike from the Two Medicine Store. An attempt was made in 2005 to change its name to Engagement Lake, but this was rejected due to the age of the incumbent name.

It is known to have the westslope cutthroat trout.

== See also ==
- List of lakes in Glacier County, Montana
