= Whitecrow Lake =

Lake in Glacier County, Montana, United States

- Location within Montana Location within the United States
- Location: Glacier National Park, Glacier County, Montana, US
- Coordinates: 48°54′01″N 113°49′55″W
- Type: Natural
- Basin countries: United States
- Max. length: .22 mi (0.35 km)
- Max. width: .08 mi (0.13 km)
- Surface elevation: 6,147 ft (1,874 m)

Whitecrow Lake is located in Glacier National Park, in the U. S. state of Montana. Whitecrow Lake is south of Whitecrow Mountain and east of Stoney Indian Peaks.

== See also ==
- List of lakes in Glacier County, Montana
