= Falling Leaf Lake =

Lake in Glacier County, Montana, United States

- Location within Montana Location within the United States
- Location: Glacier National Park, Glacier County, Montana, US
- Coordinates: 48°46′38″N 113°38′38″W
- Lake type: Natural
- Primary outflows: Allen Creek
- Basin countries: United States
- Max. length: .15 miles (0.24 km)
- Max. width: .15 miles (0.24 km)
- Surface elevation: 6,632 ft (2,021 m)

Falling Leaf Lake is located in Glacier National Park, in the U. S. state of Montana. The lake is in a cirque to the north of Allen Mountain and adjacent to Snow Moon Lake.

== See also ==
- List of lakes in Glacier County, Montana
