= Otatso Lake =

Lake in Glacier County, Montana, United States

- Location within Montana Location within the United States
- Location: Glacier National Park, Glacier County, Montana, US
- Coordinates: 48°53′31″N 113°40′36″W
- Type: Natural
- Primary outflows: Otatso Creek
- Basin countries: United States
- Max. length: .20 mi (0.32 km)
- Max. width: .20 mi (0.32 km)
- Surface area: .15 mi (0.24 km)
- Surface elevation: 6,970 ft (2,120 m)

Otatso Lake is located in Glacier National Park, in the U. S. state of Montana. Otatso Lake is situated in a cirque below unnamed peaks in the northeastern section of Glacier National Park.

== See also ==
- List of lakes in Glacier County, Montana
