= Mission Lakes =

Pair of lakes in the state of Minnesota, United States

Upper Mission Lake
- Location within Minnesota Location within the United States
- Location: Crow Wing County, Minnesota
- Group: Mission Lakes
- Coordinates: 46.554°N 94.0734°W
- Type: lake

Lower Mission Lake
- Location within Minnesota Location within the United States
- Location: Crow Wing County, Minnesota
- Group: Mission Lakes
- Coordinates: 46.5329°N 94.1001°W
- Type: lake

Mission Lakes is a pair of lakes in Crow Wing County, in the U.S. state of Minnesota.

The twin lakes consist of Upper Mission Lake and Lower Mission Lake. The Mission Lakes were named for a nearby Ojibwe mission.

Lower Mission Lake drains as Mission Creek into the Mississippi River.

== See also ==
- List of lakes in Minnesota
