= Medicine Owl Lake =

Lake in Glacier County, Montana, United States

- Location within Montana Location within the United States
- Location: Glacier National Park, Glacier County, Montana, US
- Coordinates: 48°36′21″N 113°28′50″W
- Type: Natural
- Primary outflows: Medicine Owl Creek
- Basin countries: United States
- Max. length: .30 miles (0.48 km)
- Max. width: .25 miles (0.40 km)
- Surface elevation: 6,806 ft (2,074 m)

Medicine Owl Lake is located in Glacier National Park, in the U. S. state of Montana. Amphitheater Mountain rises to the southwest and Medicine Owl Peak is immediately west of the lake. Medicine Owl Lake is in the remote backcountry of Glacier National Park and no designated or maintained trails are nearby.

== See also ==
- List of lakes in Glacier County, Montana
