= Sue Lake =

Lake in Montana, United States

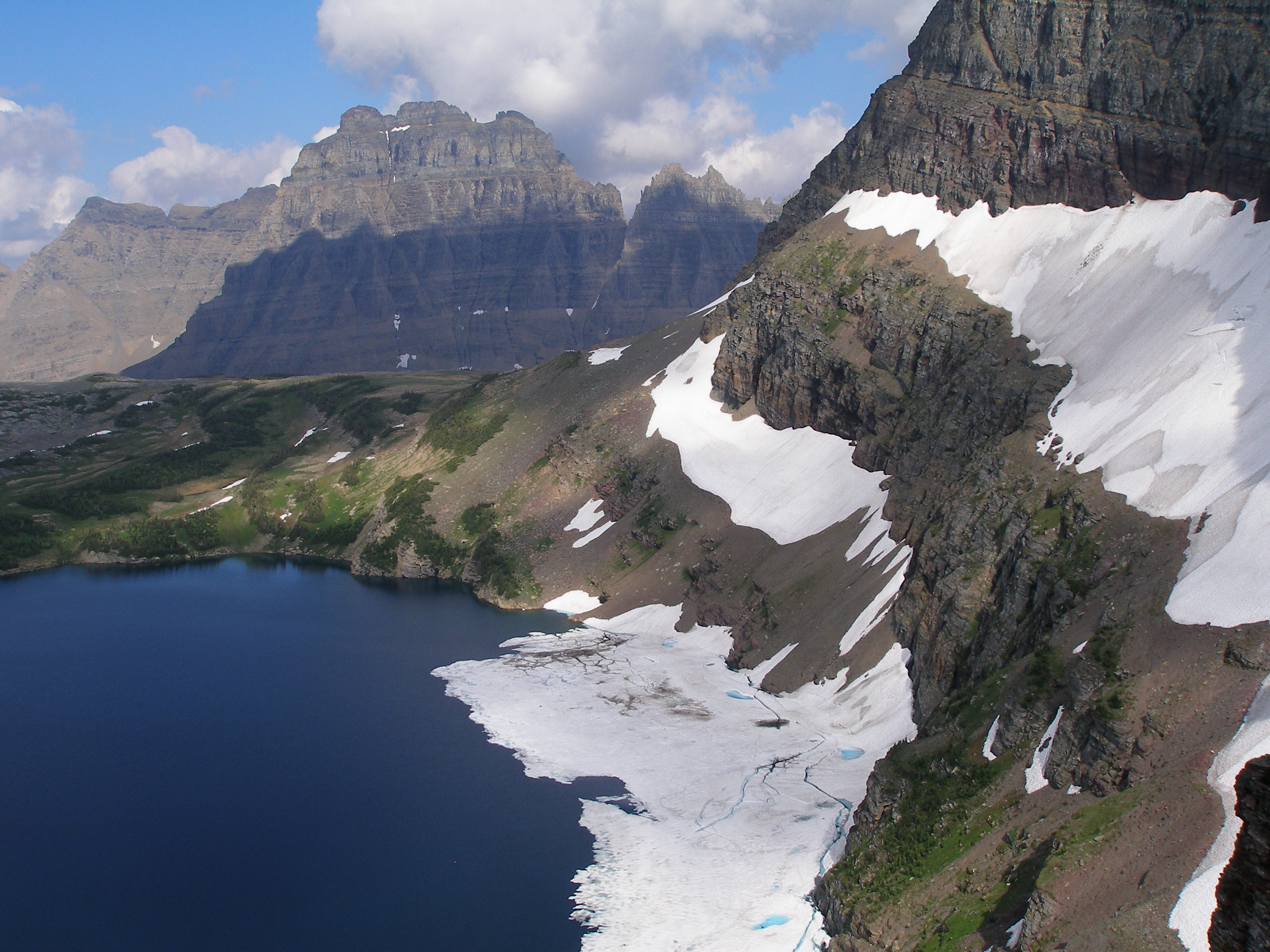
- Sue Lake, July 2009

- Location within Montana Location within the United States
- Location: Glacier National Park, Glacier County, Montana, US
- Coordinates: 48°51′39″N 113°50′46″W
- Type: Natural
- Primary outflows: Mokowanis River
- Basin countries: United States
- Max. length: .43 mi (0.69 km)
- Max. width: .35 mi (0.56 km)
- Surface elevation: 7,145 ft (2,178 m)

Sue Lake is located in Glacier National Park, in the U. S. state of Montana. Sue Lake is situated immediately northwest of Mount Kipp. Immediately after flowing out of Sue Lake, the Mokowanis River descends 560 feet (170 m) over Raven Quiver Falls.

== See also ==
- List of lakes in Glacier County, Montana
