= Pray Lake =

Lake in the American state of Montana

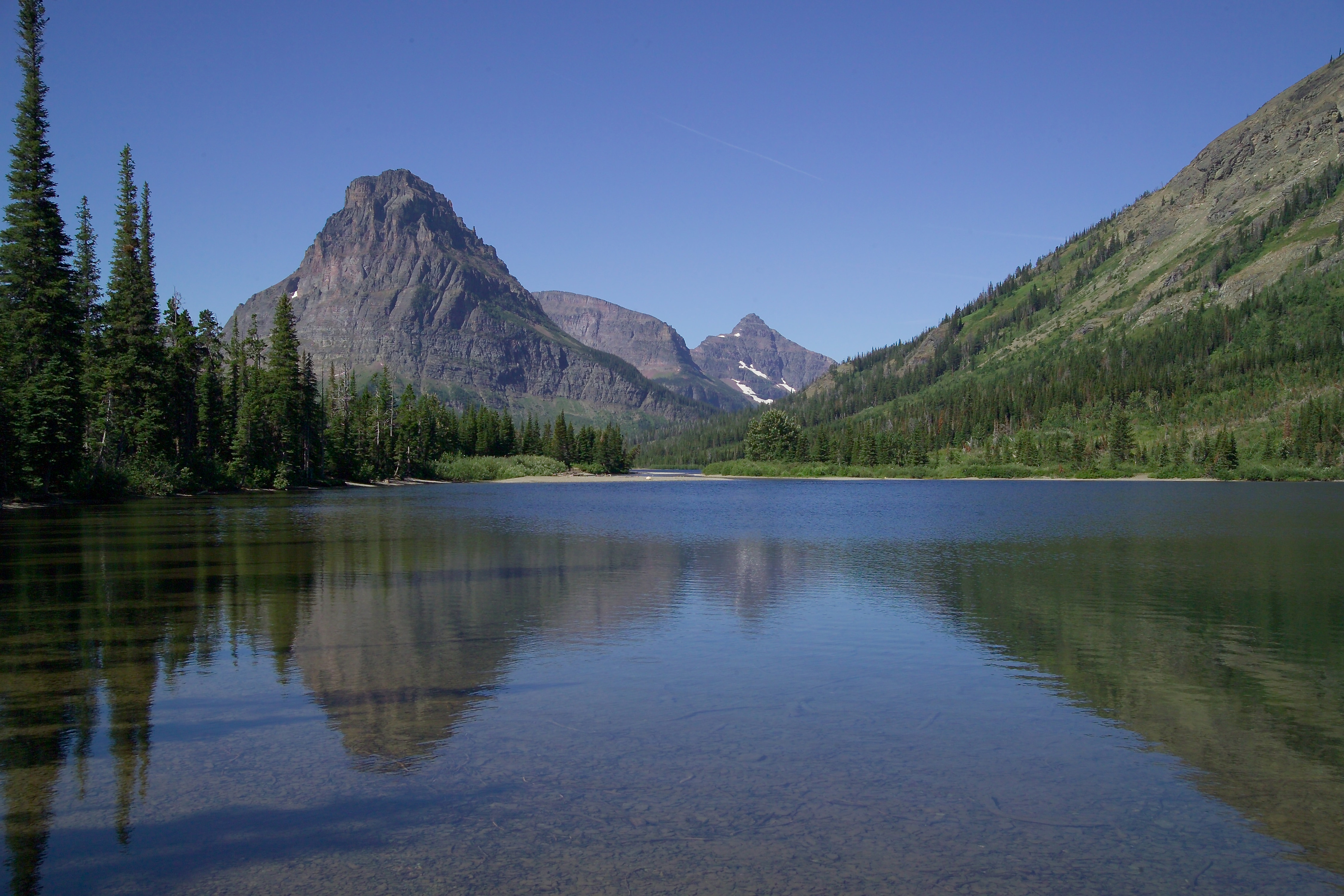

- Location within Montana Location within the United States
- Location: Glacier National Park, Glacier County, Montana, US
- Coordinates: 48°29′27″N 113°21′56″W
- Type: Natural
- Primary inflows: Two Medicine Lake
- Primary outflows: Two Medicine Creek
- Basin countries: United States
- Max. length: 700 feet (210 m)
- Max. width: 500 feet (150 m)
- Surface elevation: 5,163 ft (1,574 m)

Pray Lake is located in Glacier National Park, in the U. S. state of Montana. The lake is approximately 100 yards (91 m) northeast of Two Medicine Lake and is only 1 foot (0.30 m) lower in altitude with a short stream connecting the two. A vehicular access National Park Service campground is adjacent to the lake.

== See also ==
- List of lakes in Glacier County, Montana
