= Margaret Lake (Glacier County, Montana) =

Lake in Montana, United States

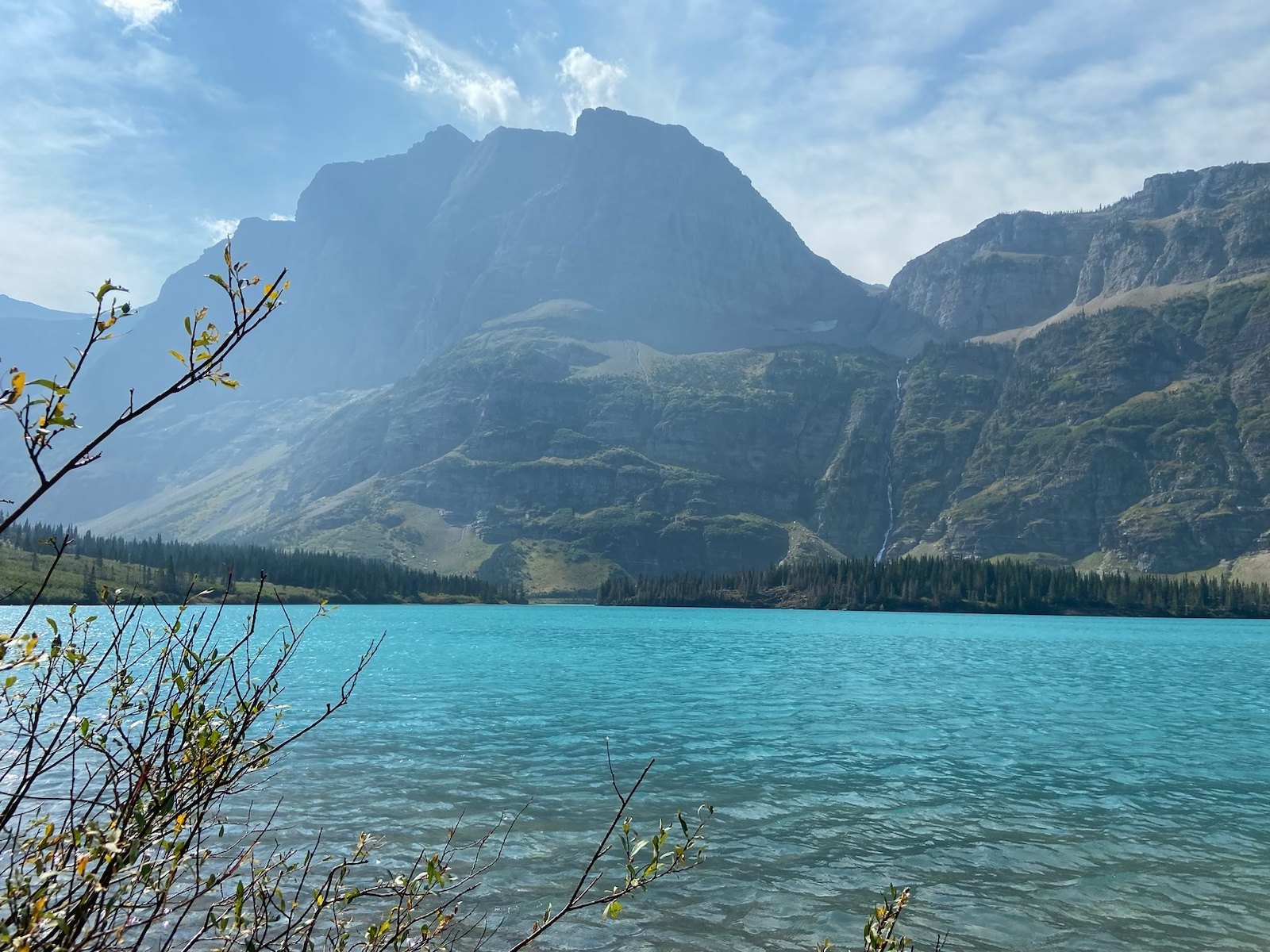
- Margaret Lake looking southwest

- Location within Montana Location within the United States
- Location: Glacier National Park, Glacier County, Montana, US
- Coordinates: 48°51′51″N 113°48′53″W
- Type: Natural
- Primary inflows: Pyramid Creek
- Primary outflows: Pyramid Creek
- Basin countries: United States
- Max. length: .50 mi (0.80 km)
- Max. width: .20 mi (0.32 km)
- Surface elevation: 5,574 ft (1,699 m)

Margaret Lake is located in Glacier National Park, in the U. S. state of Montana. Margaret Lake is less than .50 miles (0.80 km) north of Ipasha Lake. Margaret Lake is fed by Pyramid Creek as well as melt waters from Chaney Glacier. The lake has a maximum length of 0.8 km (0.5 mi) and width of 0.32 km (0.2 mi).

== Gallery ==
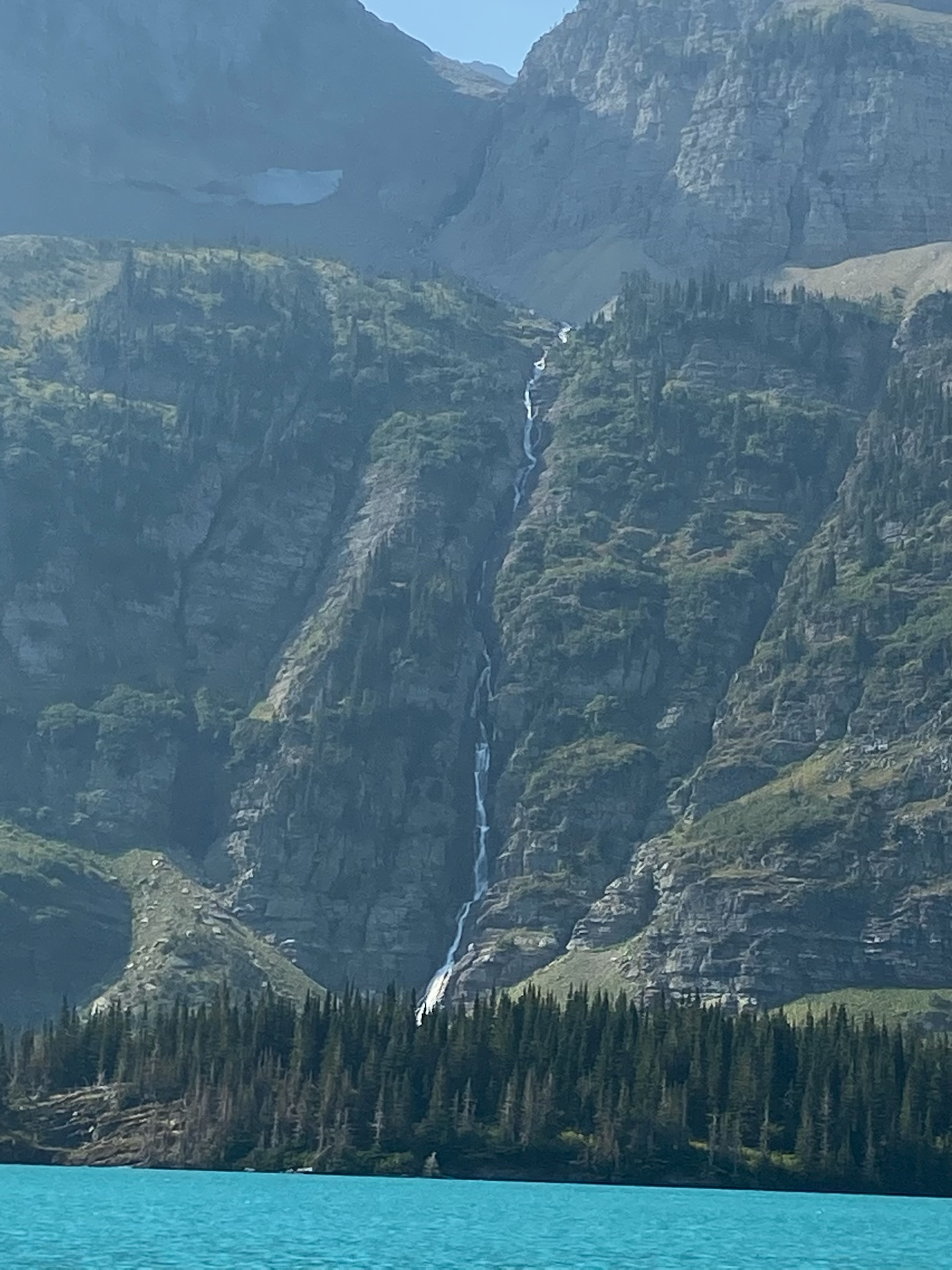
Ipasha Falls which flow into Margaret Lake from Chaney Glacier

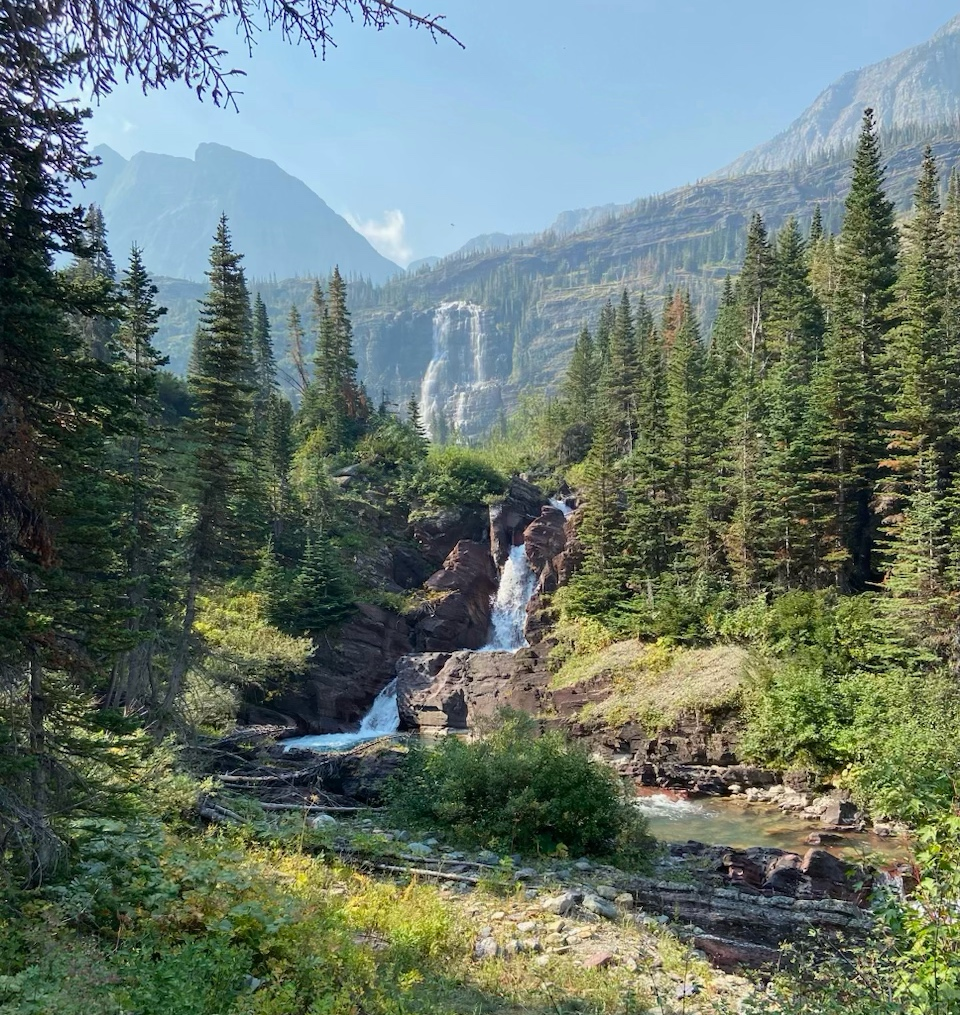
Pyramid Falls which flow out of Margaret Lake into Mokowanis Lake

== See also ==
- List of lakes in Glacier County, Montana
