= Natahki Lake =

Lake in Glacier County, Montana, United States

- Location within Montana Location within the United States
- Location: Glacier National Park, Glacier County, Montana, US
- Coordinates: 48°49′04″N 113°40′06″W
- Type: Natural
- Primary outflows: Apikuni Creek
- Basin countries: United States
- Max. length: .15 mi (0.24 km)
- Max. width: .10 mi (0.16 km)
- Surface elevation: 6,575 ft (2,004 m)

Natahki Lake is located in Glacier National Park, in the U. S. state of Montana. Natahki Lake is in a cirque below Mount Henkel to the west and south and Altyn Peak to the southeast.

== See also ==
- List of lakes in Glacier County, Montana
