= Goat Lake (Glacier County, Montana) =

Lake in the American state of Montana

- Location within Montana Location within the United States
- Location: Glacier National Park, Glacier County, Montana, US
- Coordinates: 48°41′59″N 113°34′40″W
- Lake type: Natural
- Primary outflows: Rose Creek
- Basin countries: United States
- Max. length: .50 miles (0.80 km)
- Max. width: .30 miles (0.48 km)
- Surface elevation: 5,458 ft (1,664 m)

Goat Lake is located in Glacier National Park, in the U. S. state of Montana. Goat Lake is in a cirque below Goat Mountain which looms almost 3,400 feet (1,000 m) above the lake immediately to the northwest. The lake is a 3 miles (4.8 km) hike by trail from the Rising Sun Auto Camp.

== See also ==
- List of lakes in Glacier County, Montana
