= Three Bears Lake =

Lake in Glacier County, Montana, United States

- Location within Montana Location within the United States
- Location: Glacier National Park, Glacier County, Montana, United States
- Coordinates: 48°19′29″N 113°21′50″W
- Type: Natural
- Primary outflows: Bear Creek
- Basin countries: United States
- Max. length: .30 miles (0.48 km)
- Max. width: .10 miles (0.16 km)
- Surface elevation: 5,282 ft (1,610 m)

Three Bears Lake is located in Glacier National Park, in the U. S. state of Montana. The lake is adjacent to the Continental Divide and .5 miles (0.80 km) northwest of Marias Pass.

== See also ==
- List of lakes in Glacier County, Montana
