= Elizabeth Lake (Glacier County, Montana) =

Lake in Montana, United States

- Elizabeth Lake as seen from the SSE

- Location within Montana Location within the United States
- Location: Glacier National Park, Glacier County, Montana, US
- Coordinates: 48°53′9.49″N 113°43′32.83″W
- Lake type: Natural
- Primary inflows: Belly River
- Primary outflows: Belly River
- Basin countries: United States
- Max. length: 1.35 mi (2.17 km)
- Max. width: .30 mi (0.48 km)
- Surface elevation: 4,892 ft (1,491 m)

Elizabeth Lake is located in Glacier National Park, in the U. S. state of Montana. Elizabeth Lake lies along the Belly River and is more than 2.25 miles (3.62 km) downstream from Helen Lake.

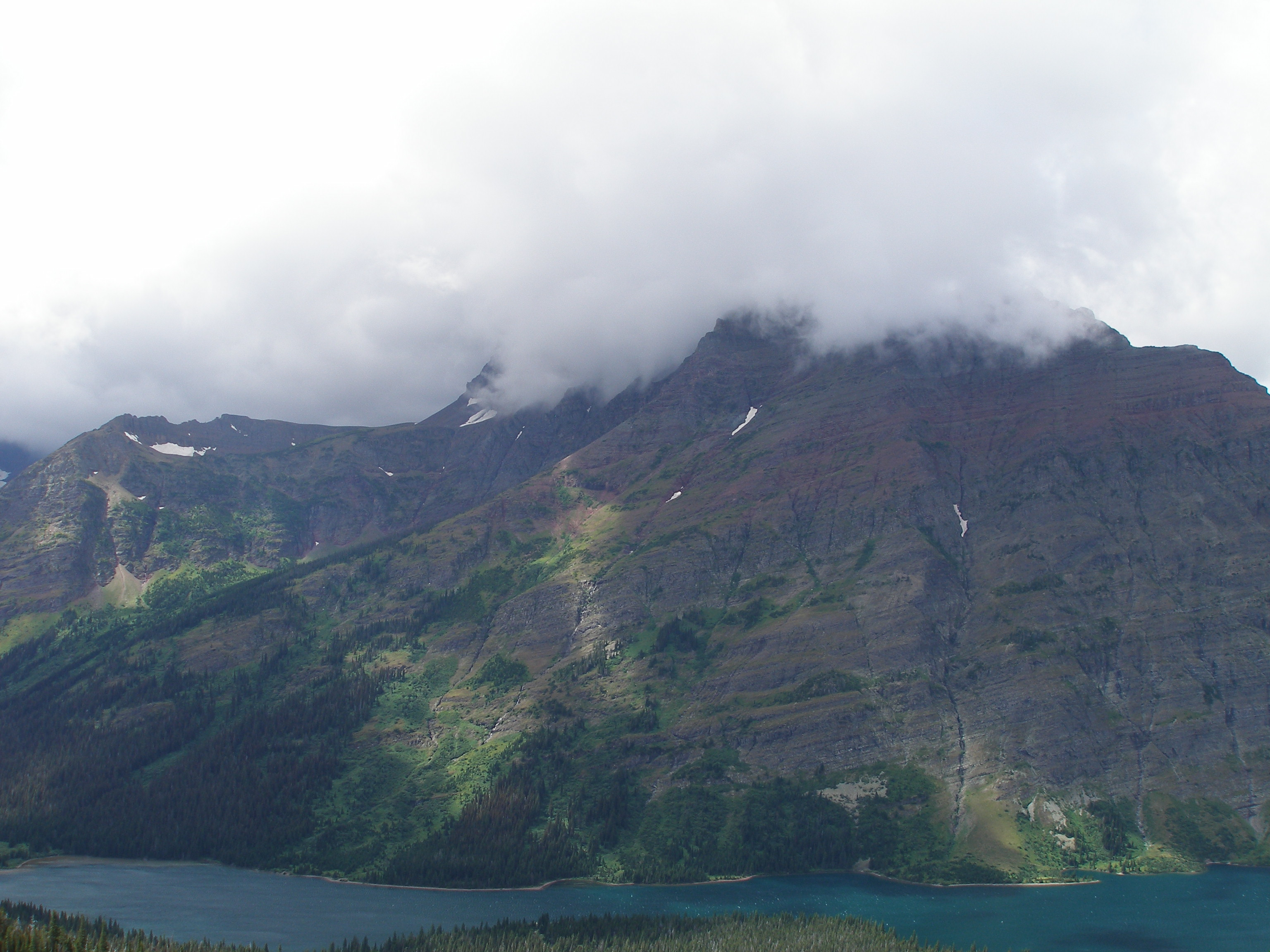
Elizabeth Lake viewed from Red Gap Pass trail.

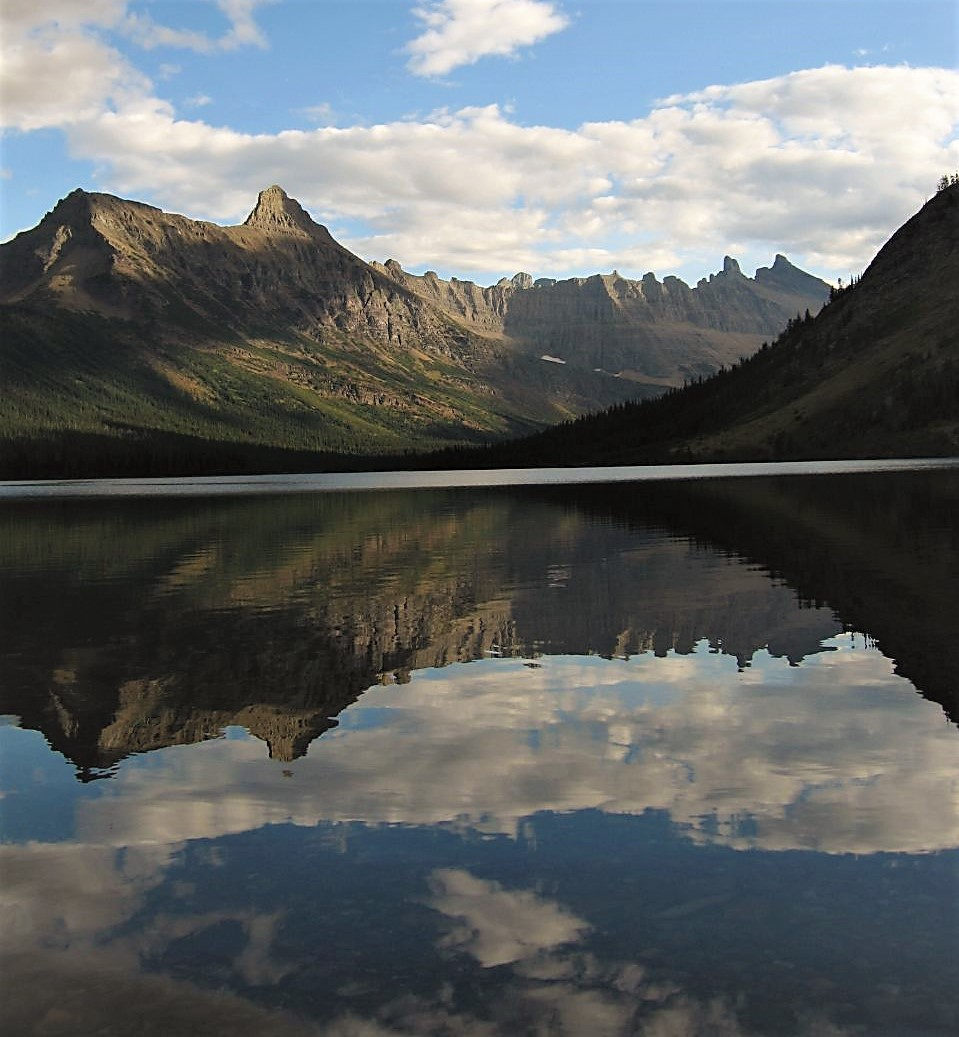
Ptarmigan Wall reflected in Elizabeth Lake

== See also ==
- List of lakes in Glacier County, Montana
