= Shaheeya Lake =

Lake in Glacier County, Montana, United States

- Location within Montana Location within the United States
- Location: Glacier National Park, Glacier County, Montana, US
- Coordinates: 48°57′22″N 113°57′32″W
- Type: Natural
- Basin countries: United States
- Max. length: .20 miles (0.32 km)
- Max. width: .09 miles (0.14 km)
- Surface elevation: 7,073 ft (2,156 m)

Shaheeya Lake is located in Glacier National Park, in the U.S. state of Montana. Shaheeya Lake is east of Shaheeya Peak.

== See also ==
- List of lakes in Glacier County, Montana
