= Kaina Lake =

Lake in Montana, USA

- Location within Montana Location within the United States
- Location: Glacier National Park, Glacier County, Montana, US
- Coordinates: 48°56′30″N 113°48′18″W
- Lake type: Natural
- Primary outflows: Kaina Creek
- Basin countries: United States
- Max. length: .40 mi (0.64 km)
- Max. width: .15 mi (0.24 km)
- Surface elevation: 6,865 ft (2,092 m)

Kaina Lake is located in Glacier National Park, in the U. S. state of Montana. Kaina Lake is south of Kaina Mountain.

== See also ==
- List of lakes in Glacier County, Montana
