= Goat Haunt Lake =

Lake in Glacier County, Montana, United States

- Location within Montana Location within the United States
- Location: Glacier National Park, Glacier County, Montana, US
- Coordinates: 48°57′34″N 113°51′25″W
- Lake type: Natural
- Primary outflows: Street Creek
- Basin countries: United States
- Max. length: .25 miles (0.40 km)
- Max. width: .10 miles (0.16 km)
- Surface elevation: 5,982 ft (1,823 m)

Goat Haunt Lake is located in Glacier National Park, in the U. S. state of Montana. Goat Haunt Mountain is southeast of the lake.

== See also ==
- List of lakes in Glacier County, Montana
