= Cobalt Lake =

Lake in the American state of Montana

- Location within Montana Location within the United States
- Location: Glacier National Park, Glacier County, Montana, US
- Coordinates: 48°26′04″N 113°25′34″W
- Lake type: Natural
- Basin countries: United States
- Max. length: .20 miles (0.32 km)
- Max. width: .12 miles (0.19 km)
- Surface elevation: 6,570 ft (2,000 m)

Cobalt Lake is located in Glacier National Park, in the U. S. state of Montana. The lake is just east of the Continental Divide in the Two Medicine region of Glacier National Park. Cobalt Lake is a 5.7-mile (9.2 km) hike from the Two Medicine Store.

== See also ==
- List of lakes in Glacier County, Montana
