= Wahseeja Lake =

Lake in Glacier County, Montana, United States

- Location within Montana Location within the United States
- Location: Glacier National Park, Glacier County, Montana, US
- Coordinates: 48°57′33″N 113°58′55″W
- Type: Natural
- Basin countries: United States
- Max. length: .25 miles (0.40 km)
- Max. width: .15 miles (0.24 km)
- Surface elevation: 6,844 ft (2,086 m)
- Islands: 1

Wahseeja Lake is located in Glacier National Park, in the U. S. state of Montana. The lake is just northwest of Shaheeya Peak.

== See also ==
- List of lakes in Glacier County, Montana
