= Lonely Lakes =

Lakes in Montana, United States

- Location within Montana Location within the United States
- Location: Glacier National Park, Glacier County, Montana, US
- Coordinates: 48°32′23″N 113°23′27″W
- Type: Natural
- Primary outflows: Lake Creek
- Basin countries: United States
- Max. length: .20 miles (0.32 km)
- Max. width: .15 miles (0.24 km)
- Surface elevation: 7,132 ft (2,174 m)

Lonely Lakes are located in Glacier National Park, in the U. S. state of Montana. The lakes are adjacent to each other and drain into Lake Creek.

== See also ==
- List of lakes in Glacier County, Montana
