= Kennedy Lake (Glacier County, Montana) =

Lake in Montana, United States

- Location within Montana Location within the United States
- Location: Glacier National Park, Glacier County, Montana, US
- Coordinates: 48°49′49″N 113°41′15″W
- Lake type: Natural
- Primary outflows: Kennedy Creek
- Basin countries: United States
- Max. length: .45 miles (0.72 km)
- Max. width: .30 miles (0.48 km)
- Surface elevation: 6,785 ft (2,068 m)

Kennedy Lake is located in Glacier National Park, in the U. S. state of Montana. The lake is in a cirque with Mount Henkel to the south and Crowfeet Mountain to the northwest. The Redgap Pass Trail is the closest maintained trail but does not go to this remote lake.

== See also ==
- List of lakes in Glacier County, Montana
