= Slide Lake (Montana) =

Lake in Glacier National Park, Montana, US

- Location within Montana Location within the United States
- Location: Glacier National Park, Glacier County, Montana, US
- Coordinates: 48°54′07″N 113°37′28″W
- Type: Natural
- Primary inflows: Otatso Creek
- Primary outflows: Otatso Creek
- Basin countries: United States
- Max. length: .40 mi (0.64 km)
- Max. width: .50 miles (0.80 km)
- Surface area: .20 miles (0.32 km)
- Surface elevation: 6,030 ft (1,840 m)

Slide Lake is located in Glacier National Park, in the U. S. state of Montana. Otatso Lake is situated north of Yellow Mountain along the Otatso Creek. The historic Slide Lake-Otatso Creek Patrol Cabin and Woodshed are 1.25 miles (2.01 km) to the east.

== See also ==
- List of lakes in Glacier County, Montana
