= Boy Lake (Cass County, Minnesota) =

Lake in the state of Minnesota, United States

- Location within Minnesota
- Location: Cass County, Minnesota
- Coordinates: 47°6′37″N 94°9′53″W
- Type: Lake
- Surface elevation: 1,293 feet (394 m)

Boy Lake is a lake in Cass County, Minnesota, in the United States.

Boy Lake was named in commemoration of Ojibwe boys who were killed there in a battle against the Sioux.

== See also ==
- List of lakes in Minnesota
