= Green Lake (Glacier County, Montana) =

Lake in Glacier County, Montana, USA

- Location within Montana Location within the United States
- Location: Glacier National Park, Glacier County, Montana, US
- Coordinates: 48°23′18″N 113°17′18″W
- Lake type: Natural
- Basin countries: United States
- Max. length: .15 miles (0.24 km)
- Max. width: .05 miles (0.080 km)
- Surface elevation: 5,184 ft (1,580 m)

Green Lake is located in Glacier National Park, in the U. S. state of Montana. The lake is near the southern border of Glacier National Park, midway between Marias Pass and East Glacier Park, Montana.

== See also ==
- List of lakes in Glacier County, Montana
