= Fishercap Lake =

Lake in Glacier County, Montana, United States

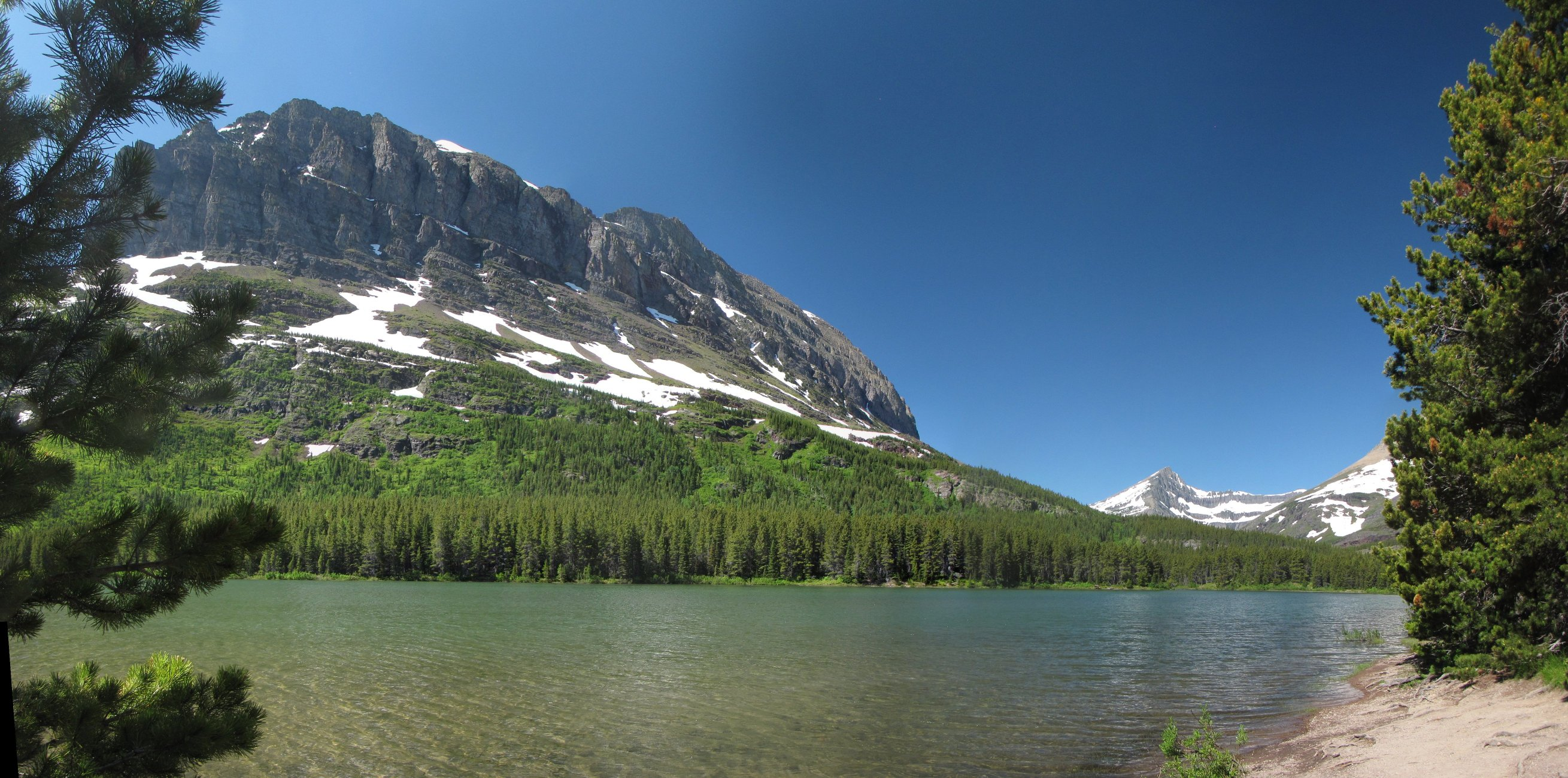

- Location within Montana Location within the United States
- Location: Glacier National Park, Glacier County, Montana, US
- Coordinates: 48°47′52″N 113°41′07″W
- Lake type: Natural
- Primary inflows: Swiftcurrent Creek
- Primary outflows: Swiftcurrent Creek
- Basin countries: United States
- Max. length: .20 miles (0.32 km)
- Max. width: .10 miles (0.16 km)
- Surface elevation: 4,944 ft (1,507 m)

Fishercap Lake is located in Glacier National Park, in the U. S. state of Montana. Mount Wilbur is west of Fishercap Lake. The lake is almost adjacent to the Swiftcurrent Auto Camp Historic District.

== See also ==
- List of lakes in Glacier County, Montana
