= Shaheeya Peak =

Mountain in the American state of Montana

- Location within Montana Location within the United States

Highest point
- Elevation: 8,052 ft (2,454 m)
- Prominence: 692 ft (211 m)
- Coordinates: 48°57′21″N 113°58′23″W

Geography
- Location: Glacier County, Montana, U.S.
- Parent range: Livingston Range
- Topo map(s): USGS Porcupine Ridge, MT

Shaheeya Peak (8,052 feet (2,454 m)) is located in the Livingston Range, Glacier National Park in the U.S. state of Montana. Shaheeya Lake is just east of the peak and Wahseeja Lake is to the northwest.

== See also ==
- List of mountains and mountain ranges of Glacier National Park (U.S.)
