= Medicine Grizzly Peak =

Mountain in the American state of Montana

- Northeast side

Highest point
- Elevation: 8,320 ft (2,540 m)
- Prominence: 475 ft (145 m)
- Coordinates: 48°33′34″N 113°27′55″W

Geography
- Location within Montana Location within the United States
- Location: Glacier County, Montana, U.S.
- Parent range: Lewis Range
- Topo map(s): USGS Cut Bank Pass, MT

Medicine Grizzly Peak (8,320 feet (2,536 m)) is located in the Lewis Range, Glacier National Park in the U.S. state of Montana.

Medicine Grizzly Peak in the center. Looking ESE. Taken from Triple Divide Pass. Medicine Grizzly Lake in the bottom.

== See also ==
- Mountains and mountain ranges of Glacier National Park (U.S.)
