= Katoya Lake =

Lake in Glacier County, Montana, United States

- Location within Montana Location within the United States
- Location: Glacier National Park, Glacier County, Montana, US
- Coordinates: 48°31′41″N 113°26′51″W
- Lake type: Natural
- Primary outflows: North Fork Cut Bank Creek
- Basin countries: United States
- Max. length: .25 miles (0.40 km)
- Max. width: .10 miles (0.16 km)
- Surface elevation: 6,368 ft (1,941 m)

Katoya Lake is located in Glacier National Park, in the U. S. state of Montana. The lake is northeast of Pitamakan Lake; Red Mountain rises more than 3,000 feet (910 m) above Katoya Lake to the northeast. The lake is 0.25 miles (0.40 km) long and 0.10 miles (0.16 km) wide. Its surface elevation is 6,368 ft (1,941 m).

== See also ==
- List of lakes in Glacier County, Montana
