= Medicine Grizzly Lake =

Lake in Glacier County, Montana, United States

- Medicine Grizzly Lake seen from Triple Divide Pass. Medicine Grizzly Peak on the center.

- Location within Montana Location within the United States
- Location: Glacier National Park, Glacier County, Montana, US
- Coordinates: 48°33′59″N 113°29′44″W
- Type: Natural
- Primary outflows: Atlantic Creek
- Basin countries: United States
- Max. length: .50 miles (0.80 km)
- Max. width: .25 miles (0.40 km)
- Surface elevation: 5,563 ft (1,696 m)

Medicine Grizzly Lake is located in Glacier National Park, in the U. S. state of Montana. The lake is surrounded by high peaks including Triple Divide Peak to the west and Mount James to the north.

== See also ==
- List of lakes in Glacier County, Montana
