= Otokomi Lake =

Lake in the American state of Montana

- Location within Montana Location within the United States
- Location: Glacier National Park, Glacier County, Montana, US
- Coordinates: 48°43′03″N 113°35′53″W
- Type: Natural
- Primary outflows: Rose Creek
- Basin countries: United States
- Max. length: .30 miles (0.48 km)
- Max. width: .15 miles (0.24 km)
- Surface elevation: 6,482 ft (1,976 m)

Otokomi Lake is located in Glacier National Park, in the U. S. state of Montana. Otokomi Lake is in a cirque north of Goat Mountain. The lake is a 5.2 miles (8.4 km) hike by trail from the Rising Sun Auto Camp.

== See also ==
- List of lakes in Glacier County, Montana
