= Atsina Lake =

Lake in Glacier County, Montana, United States

- Atsina Lake as seen from the southwest. Taken from Paiota Falls.

- Location within Montana Location within the United States
- Location: Glacier National Park, Glacier County, Montana, US
- Coordinates: 48°52′30″N 113°50′36″W
- Type: Natural
- Primary inflows: Mokowanis River
- Primary outflows: Mokowanis River
- Basin countries: United States
- Max. length: .20 mi (0.32 km)
- Max. width: .15 mi (0.24 km)
- Surface elevation: 5,765 ft (1,757 m)

Atsina Lake is in Glacier National Park in the U. S. state of Montana, just to the west of Pyramid Peak. Atsina Lake has several waterfalls nearby including Paiota Falls, Atsina Falls and the Mokowanis Cascade.

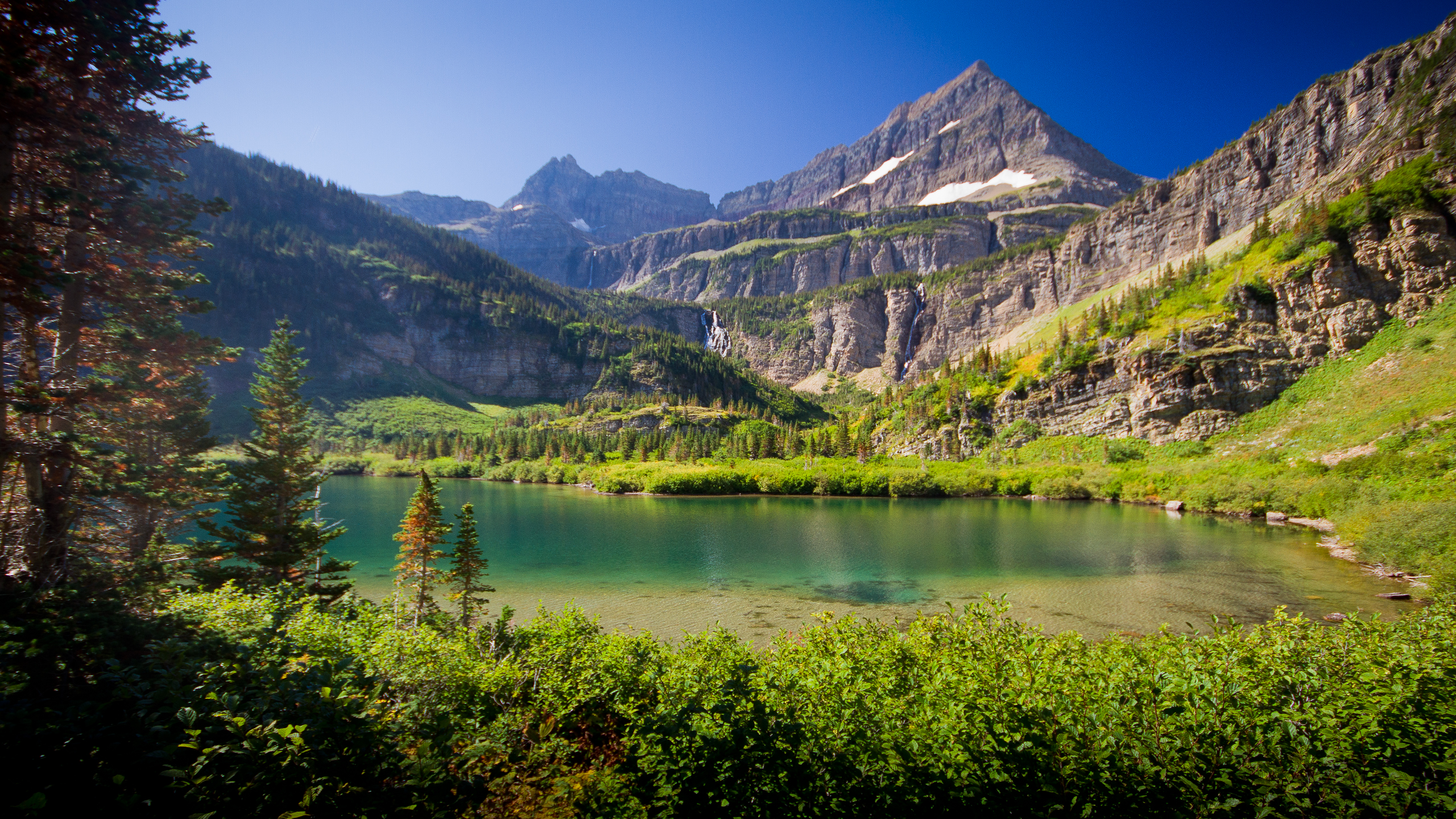
Atsina Lake with Cathedral Peak

== See also ==
- List of lakes in Glacier County, Montana
