= Miche Wabun Glacier =

Glacier in Montana, United States

- Location within Montana
- Type: Glacieret
- Location: Glacier National Park, Glacier County, Montana, U.S.
- Coordinates: 48°56′51″N 113°50′03″W
- Area: Less than 25 acres (0.10 km^{2}) in 2010
- Terminus: Talus
- Status: Retreating

Miche Wabun Glacier is a glacier remnant (glacieret) in the U.S. state of Montana in the northeastern region of Glacier National Park. The glacieret is situated in a cirque to the east of Goat Haunt Mountain. Miche Wabun Glacier was measured in 2010 to have retreated to less than 25 acres (0.10 km^{2}) in area, considered to be a minimal size to qualify as being considered an active glacier. Between 1966 and 2005, the glacier lost over 55 percent of its surface area.

== See also ==
- List of glaciers in the United States
- Glaciers in Glacier National Park (U.S.)
