= Lena Lake (Glacier County, Montana) =

Lake in Montana, United States

- Location within Montana Location within the United States
- Location: Glacier National Park, Glacier County, Montana, US
- Coordinates: 48°24′17″N 113°20′17″W
- Type: Natural
- Primary outflows: Railroad Creek
- Basin countries: United States
- Max. length: .20 miles (0.32 km)
- Max. width: .10 miles (0.16 km)
- Surface elevation: 6,411 ft (1,954 m)

Lena Lake is located in Glacier National Park, in the U. S. state of Montana. Richard T. Evans, USGS topographer who worked on the early map of Glacier Park, is reported to have named this lake for his wife, Macy Lena Leins.

== See also ==
- List of lakes in Glacier County, Montana
