= Redhorn Peak =

Mountain in Montana, United States

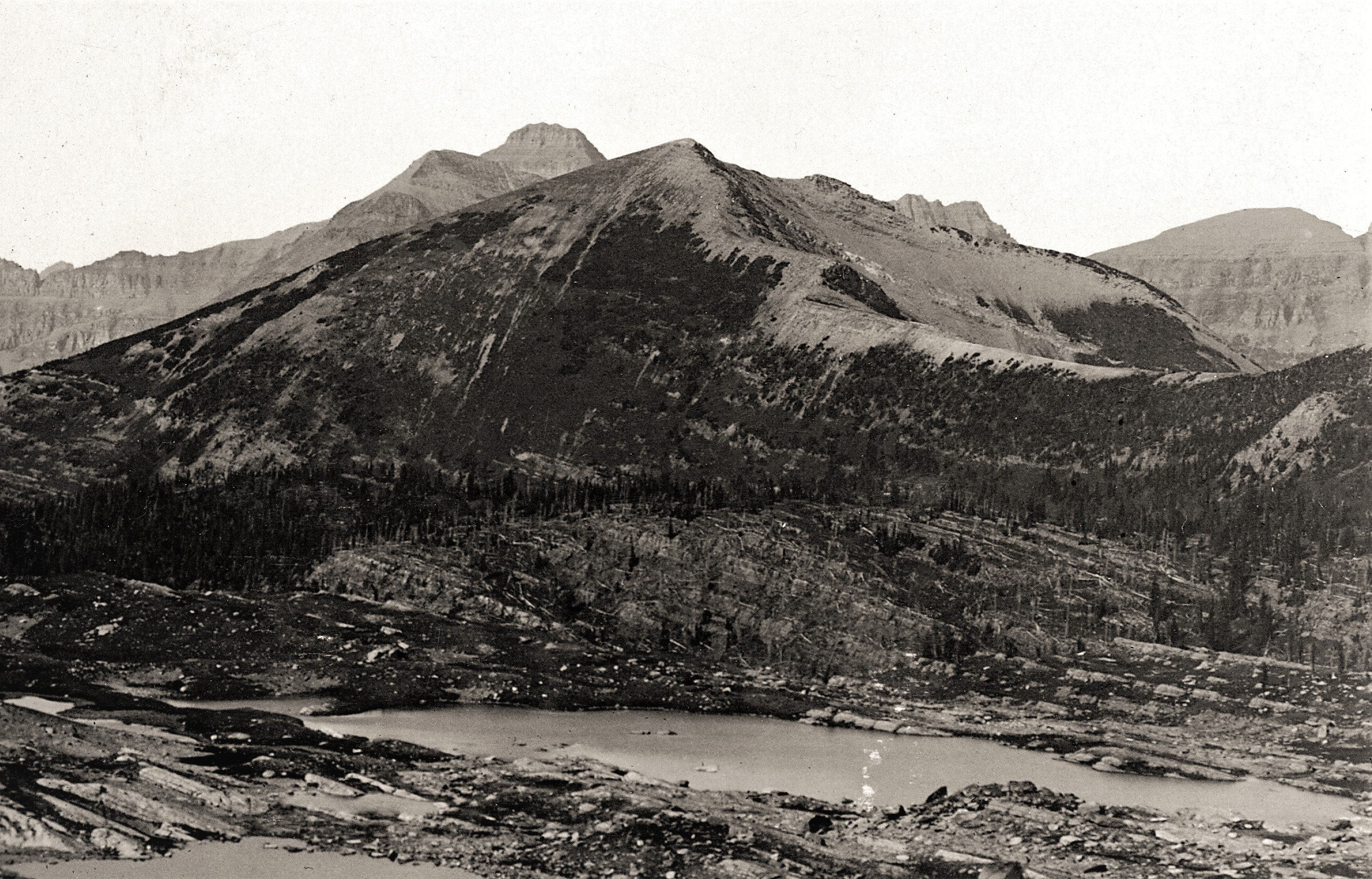
- South aspect, 1913

Highest point
- Elevation: 8,128 ft (2,477 m)
- Prominence: 688 ft (210 m)
- Coordinates: 48°51′54″N 114°00′23″W

Geography
- Location within Montana
- Location: Flathead County, Montana, Glacier County, Montana, U.S.
- Parent range: Livingston Range
- Topo map(s): USGS Vulture Peak, MT

Redhorn Peak (8,128 feet (2,477 m)) is located in the Livingston Range, Glacier National Park in the U.S. state of Montana. Redhorn Peak is situated along the Continental Divide.

== See also ==
- List of mountains and mountain ranges of Glacier National Park (U.S.)
