= Redhorn Lake =

Lake in Glacier County, Montana, United States

- Location within Montana Location within the United States
- Location: Glacier National Park, Glacier County, Montana, US
- Coordinates: 48°51′54″N 113°58′45″W
- Type: Natural
- Primary outflows: S. Fork Valentine Creek
- Basin countries: United States
- Max. length: .30 mi (0.48 km)
- Max. width: .20 mi (0.32 km)
- Surface elevation: 6,109 ft (1,862 m)

Redhorn Lake is located in Glacier National Park, in the U. S. state of Montana. Redhorn Lake is in the Livingston Range.

== See also ==
- List of lakes in Glacier County, Montana
