= Nahsukin Mountain =

Mountain in the American state of Montana

- Location within Montana Location within the United States

Highest point
- Elevation: 8,194 ft (2,498 m)
- Prominence: 754 ft (230 m)
- Coordinates: 48°50′28″N 113°59′22″W

Geography
- Location: Flathead County, Montana, Glacier County, Montana, U.S.
- Parent range: Livingston Range
- Topo map(s): USGS Mount Geduhn, MT

Nahsukin Mountain (8,194 feet (2,498 m)) is located in the Livingston Range, Glacier National Park in the U.S. state of Montana. Nahsukin Mountain is situated along the Continental Divide. "Nahsukin" is Kootenai for "chief".

Nahsukin Mountain in front of Vulture Peak

== See also ==
- List of mountains and mountain ranges of Glacier National Park (U.S.)
