= Carcajou Lake =

Lake in Glacier National Park, Montana, US

- Location within Montana Location within the United States
- Location: Glacier National Park, Glacier County, Montana, US
- Coordinates: 48°58′13″N 113°59′27″W
- Lake type: Natural
- Basin countries: United States
- Max. length: .60 miles (0.97 km)
- Max. width: .30 miles (0.48 km)
- Surface elevation: 5,633 ft (1,717 m)
- Islands: 1

Carcajou Lake is located in Glacier National Park, in the U. S. state of Montana. The lake is on the north slope of Porcupine Ridge.

The word carcajou is Canadian French for "wolverine".

== See also ==
- List of lakes in Glacier County, Montana
