= North Swiftcurrent Glacier =

Glacier in the U.S. state of Montana

- Location within Montana
- Type: Mountain glacier
- Location: Glacier National Park, Glacier County, Montana, U.S.
- Coordinates: 48°47′20″N 113°46′08″W
- Area: Approximately 19 acres (0.077 km^{2}) in 2005
- Length: .10 mi (0.16 km)
- Terminus: Talus
- Status: Retreating

North Swiftcurrent Glacier is a glacier in Glacier National Park in the U.S. state of Montana. It is situated immediately to the east of the Continental Divide and north of Swiftcurrent Mountain at an elevation between 8,000 ft (2,400 m) and 7,000 ft (2,100 m) above sea level. North Swiftcurrent Glacier consists of several remnant glaciers and additional ice patches, none of which exceed 19 acres (0.077 km^{2}) in surface area and do not meet the threshold of 25 acres (0.10 km^{2}) often cited as being the minimum size to qualify as an active glacier. The glacier lost over 32 percent of its area between 1966 and 2005.

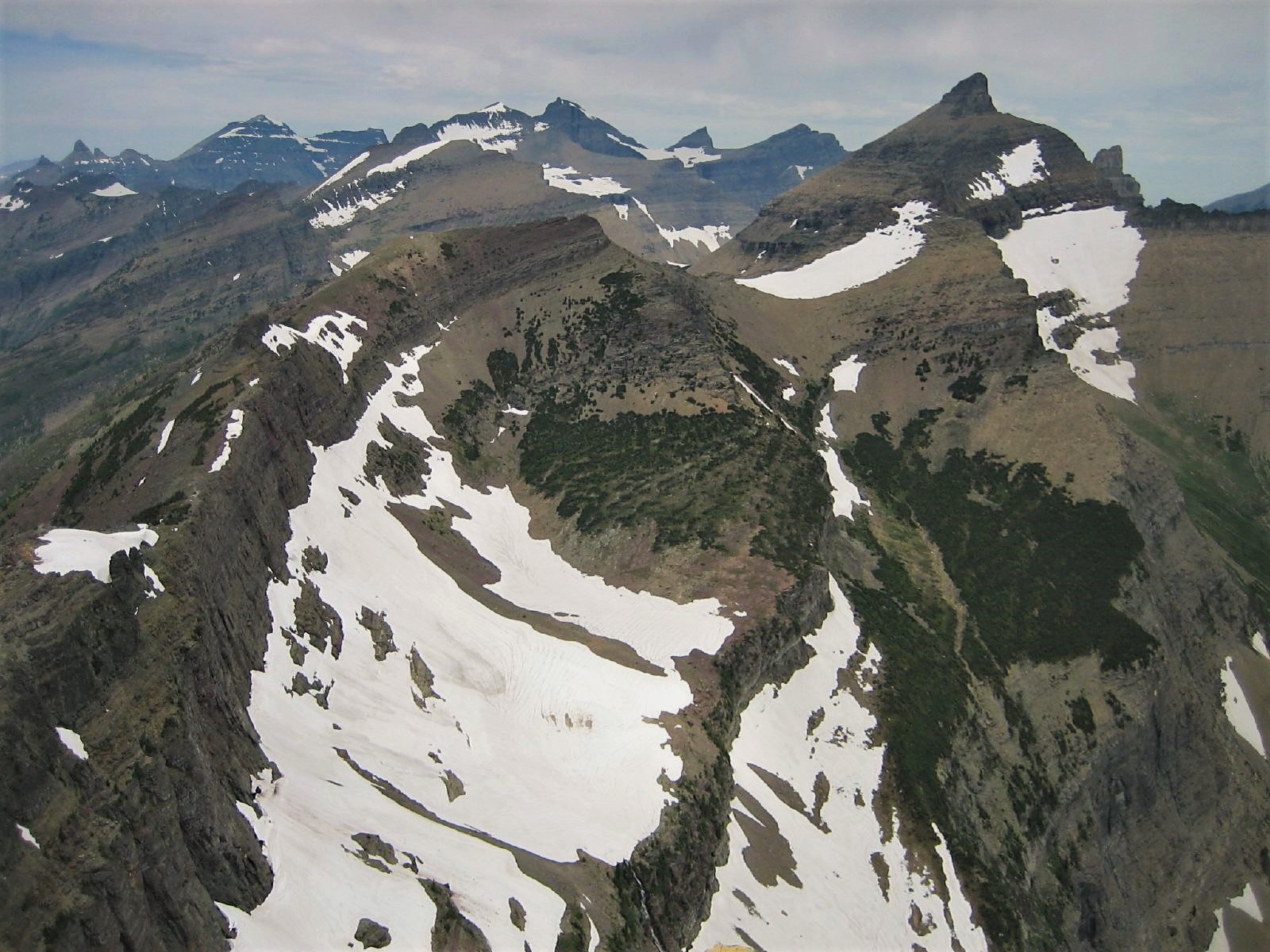
North Swiftcurrent Glacier in lower half of frame, viewed from Swiftcurrent Mountain lookout. Iceberg Peak's south aspect in upper right.

== See also ==
- List of glaciers in the United States
- Glaciers in Glacier National Park (U.S.)
