= Boy Lake (Glacier County, Montana) =

Lake in United States of America

- Location within Montana Location within the United States
- Location: Glacier National Park, Glacier County, Montana, US
- Coordinates: 48°30′06″N 113°26′23″W
- Lake type: Natural
- Primary outflows: Dry Fork
- Basin countries: United States
- Max. length: .20 miles (0.32 km)
- Max. width: .15 miles (0.24 km)
- Surface elevation: 6,330 ft (1,930 m)

Boy Lake is located in Glacier National Park, in the U. S. state of Montana. Boy Lake is approximately 1 mile (1.6 km) WWN of Rising Wolf Mountain.

== See also ==
- List of lakes in Glacier County, Montana
