= Kootenai Peak =

Mountain in Montana, United States

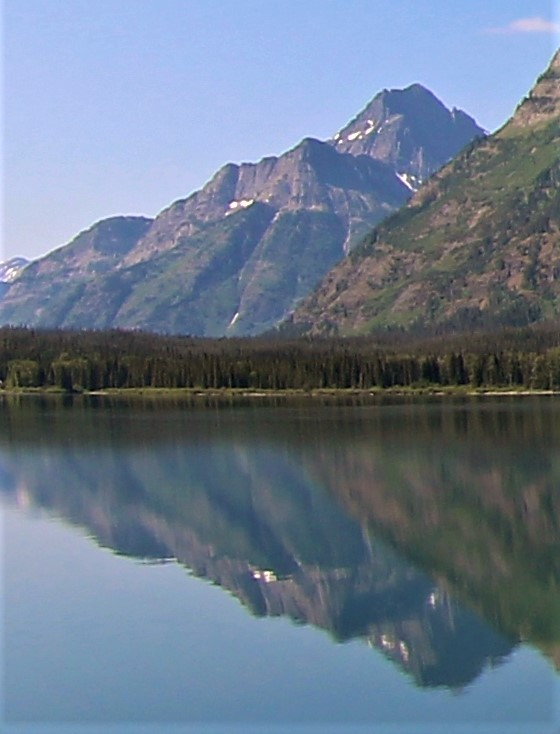
- North aspect, from Waterton Lake

Highest point
- Elevation: 8,546 ft (2,605 m)
- Prominence: 1,902 ft (580 m)
- Coordinates: 48°53′25″N 113°56′30″W

Geography
- Location within Montana Location within the United States
- Location: Glacier County, Montana, U.S.
- Parent range: Lewis Range
- Topo map(s): USGS Porcupine Ridge, MT

Kootenai Peak (8,542 feet (2,604 m)) is located in the Lewis Range, Glacier National Park in the U.S. state of Montana. Kootenai Peak is in the northeastern section of Glacier National Park.

== Climate ==
Based on the Köppen climate classification, it is located in an alpine subarctic climate zone with long, cold, snowy winters, and cool to warm summers. Temperatures can drop below −10 °F with wind chill factors below −30 °F.

== Geology ==
Like other mountains in Glacier National Park, it is composed of sedimentary rock laid down during the Precambrian to Jurassic periods. Formed in shallow seas, this sedimentary rock was initially uplifted beginning 170 million years ago when the Lewis Overthrust fault pushed an enormous slab of precambrian rocks 3 mi (4.8 km) thick, 50 miles (80 km) wide and 160 miles (260 km) long over younger rock of the cretaceous period.

== See also ==
- Mountains and mountain ranges of Glacier National Park (U.S.)

== Gallery ==
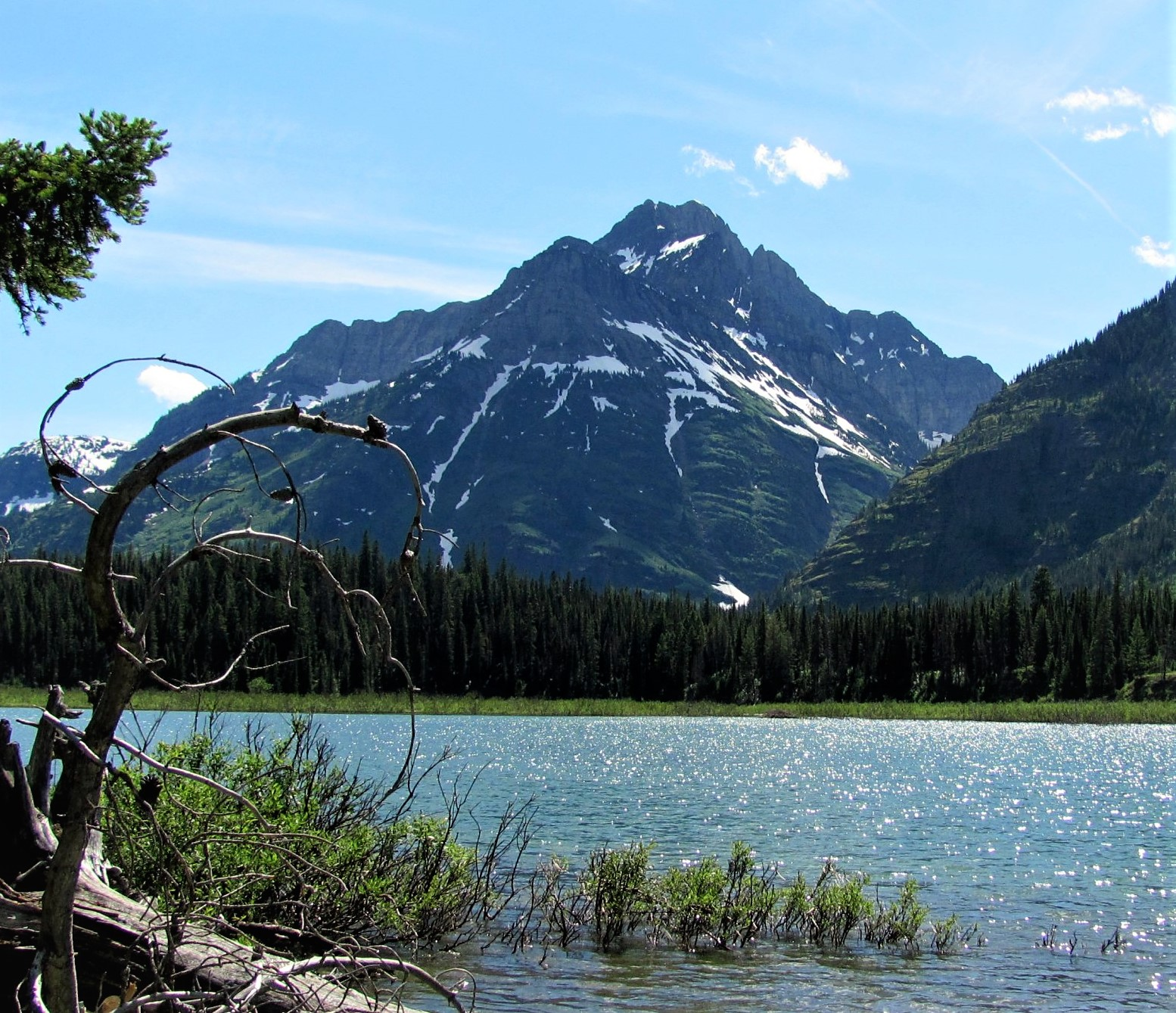
Kootenai Peak seen from Kootenai Lakes

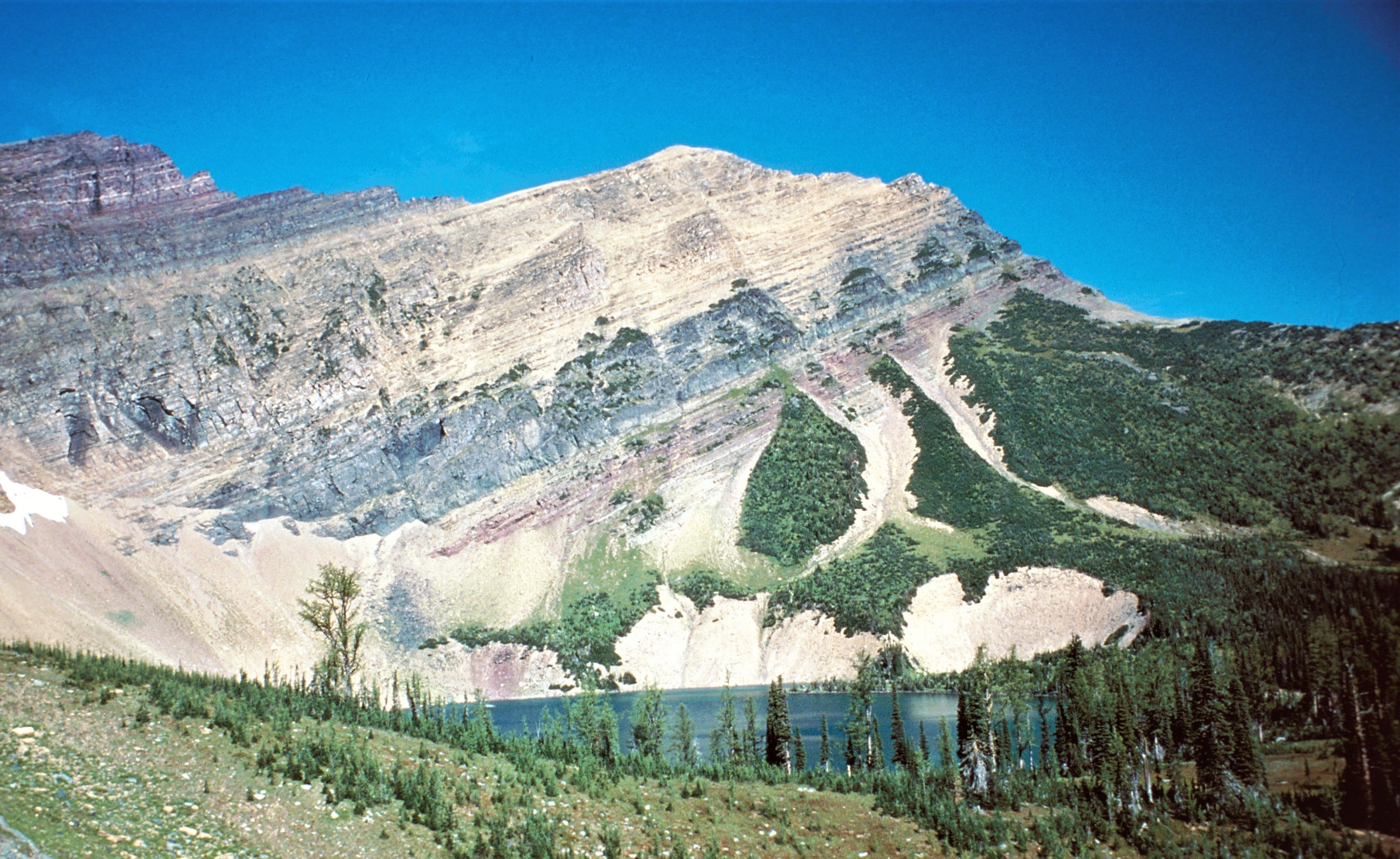
The south aspect of Kootenai Peak rises above Bench Lake
