= Lake Frances (Glacier County, Montana) =

Lake in Montana, United States

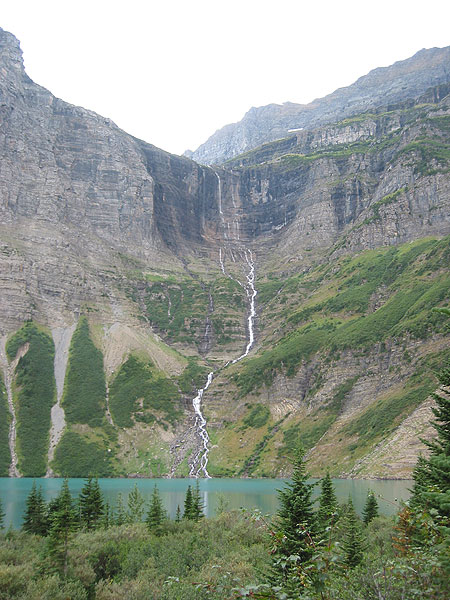
- Waterfall flows into Lake Frances

- Location within Montana Location within the United States
- Location: Glacier National Park, Glacier County, Montana, US
- Coordinates: 48°56′20″N 114°00′07″W
- Type: Natural
- Primary inflows: Thunderbird Creek
- Primary outflows: Olson Creek
- Basin countries: United States
- Max. length: .60 miles (0.97 km)
- Max. width: .30 miles (0.48 km)
- Surface elevation: 5,255 ft (1,602 m)

Lake Frances is located in Glacier National Park, in the U. S. state of Montana. Runoff from the Dixon Glacier empties into the south side of the lake while runoff from Thunderbird Glacier flows into Thunderbird Creek and into the east shore of the lake.

Looking southeast.

== See also ==
- List of waterfalls
- List of waterfalls by height
- List of lakes in Glacier County, Montana
