= Hudson Glacier =

Glacier in Montana, United States

- Location within Montana
- Type: Mountain glacier
- Location: Glacier National Park, Glacier County, Montana, U.S.
- Coordinates: 48°57′53″N 114°02′41″W
- Area: Approximately 8 acres (0.032 km^{2}) in 2005
- Length: .15 mi (0.24 km)
- Terminus: Moraine and talus
- Status: Retreating

Hudson Glacier is located in the US state of Montana in Glacier National Park. The glacier is situated in a cirque immediately to the east of the Continental Divide at an elevation between 7,500 feet (2,300 m) and 7,200 feet (2,200 m) above sea level. A half-mile south of Lake Nooney and Lake Wurdeman, Hudson Glacier covers an area of approximately 8 acres (0.032 km^{2}) and does not meet the threshold of 25 acres (0.10 km^{2}) often cited as being the minimum size to qualify as an active glacier. Between 1966 and 2005, the glacier lost more than 66 percent of its acreage.

== See also ==
- List of glaciers in the United States
- Glaciers in Glacier National Park (U.S.)
