= Piegan Falls =

Waterfall in the U.S. state of Montana

- Location within Montana
- Location: Glacier National Park (U.S.), Montana, U.S.
- Coordinates: 48°42′36″N 113°40′41″W
- Type: Cascade/Fall
- Total height: 2,400 ft (732 m)
- Number of drops: 7
- Average flow rate: 0

Piegan Falls is a waterfall in Glacier National Park, Montana, US. Piegan Falls have several major drops in its 2,400-foot (730 m) descent from the slopes of Piegan Mountain and Piegan Glacier. The falls are seen from the trails above Siyeh Bend en route to Piegan Pass.
