= Boulder Glacier =

Boulder Glacier may refer to:

- Boulder Glacier (Washington) located on Mount Baker, Cascade Range, U.S. state of Washington.
- Boulder Glacier (Montana) located in Glacier National Park (U.S.), Montana.
