= Vulture Glacier =

Vulture Glacier may refer to:

- Vulture Glacier (Alberta) a glacier in Banff National Park, Canada
- Vulture Glacier (Montana) a glacier in Glacier National Park, USA
- Vulture Glacier (Azeroth) a fictional glacier in the dwarven kingdoms of the realm of Azeroth
