= Baby Glacier =

Baby Glacier may refer to:

- Baby Glacier (Alaska) located in College Fjord, U.S. state of Alaska
- Baby Glacier (Canada) located in the Arctic archipelago of Canada
- Baby Glacier (Montana) located in Glacier National Park (U.S.), U.S. state of Montana
- Baby Glacier (Wyoming) located in the Wind River Range, U.S. state of Wyoming
