= Wurdeman =

Wurdeman may refer to:

- Lake Wurdeman, Glacier National Park, Montana, U.S.
- Wurdeman & Becket, an architectural firm

== People with the surname ==
- Charles Wurdeman (1871-1961), American architect
- Walter Wurdeman (1903–1949), American architect
