= Carter Glaciers =

Glaciers in Montana, United States

- Location within Montana
- Type: Mountain glacier
- Location: Glacier National Park, Glacier County, Montana, USA
- Coordinates: 48°53′09″N 114°02′29″W
- Area: Total of 50 acres (20 ha) in 2005 counting separate ice bodies
- Length: .30 mi (0.48 km)
- Terminus: Moraine and talus
- Status: Retreating

The Carter Glaciers are in Glacier National Park in the U.S. state of Montana. The glaciers are situated along a ridge immediately to the east of the Continental Divide, mainly below an unnamed peak which rises to 9,164 feet (2,793 m). The glaciers cover an area of approximately 50 acres (0.20 km^{2}) at an elevation between 8,500 feet (2,600 m) and 7,200 feet (2,200 m) above sea level. The Carter Glaciers consist of between three and four separate small glacial remnants (glacierets), none of which meet the threshold of 25 acres (0.10 km^{2}) often cited as being the minimum size to qualify as an active glacier.

== See also ==
- List of glaciers in the United States
- Glaciers in Glacier National Park (U.S.)
