= Thunderbird Mountain =

Mountain in the American state of Montana

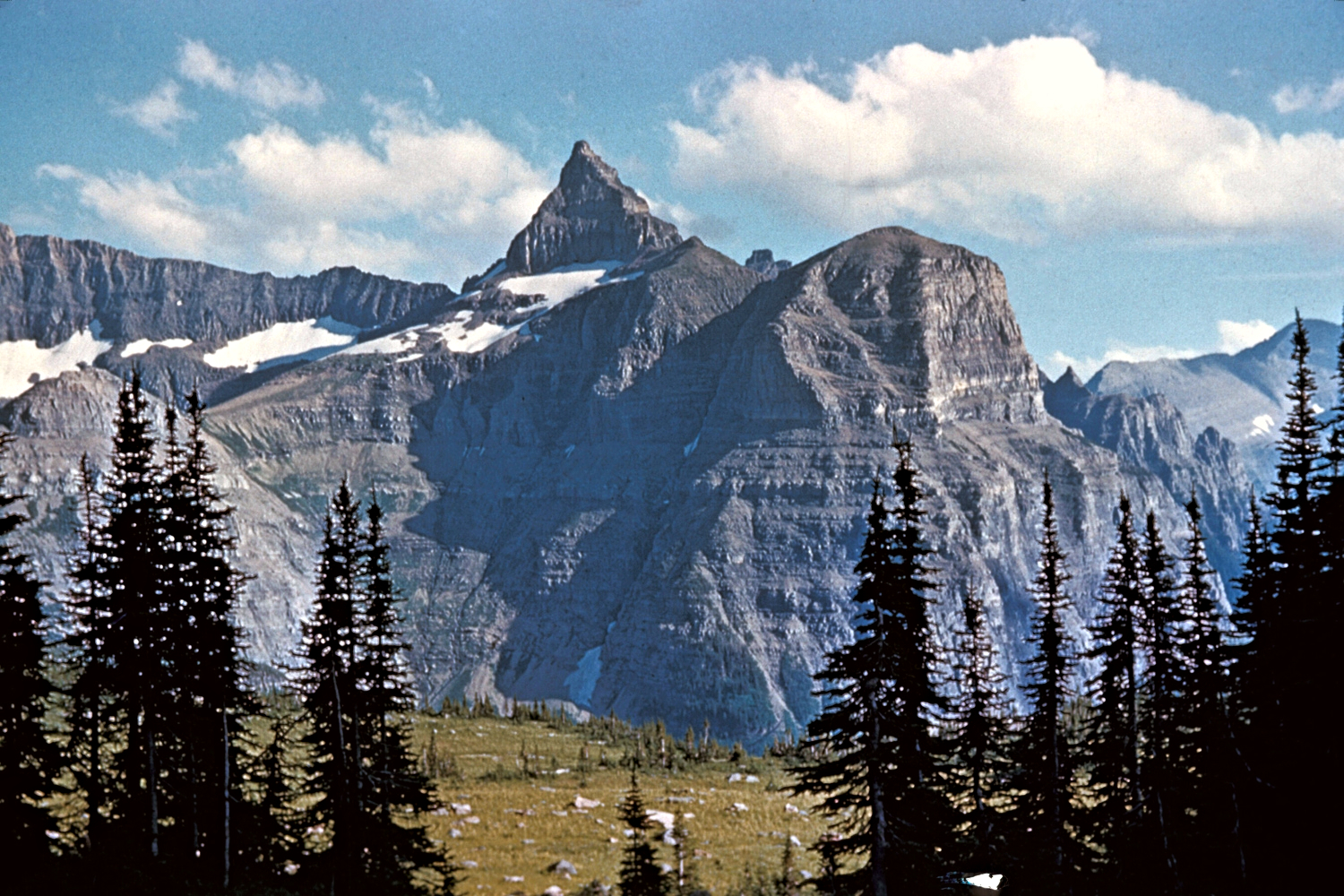
- Thunderbird Mountain

Highest point
- Elevation: 8,805 ft (2,684 m)
- Prominence: 560 ft (170 m)
- Coordinates: 48°56′01″N 114°02′45″W

Naming
- Etymology: Thunderbird

Geography
- Location within Montana
- Location: Flathead County, Montana, Glacier County, Montana, U.S.
- Parent range: Livingston Range
- Topo map(s): USGS Mount Carter, MT

Thunderbird Mountain (8,805 feet (2,684 m)) is located in the Livingston Range, Glacier National Park in the U.S. state of Montana. Thunderbird Mountain is situated on the Continental Divide. Thunderbird Glacier is located immediately northeast of the mountain.

== Geology ==
Like other mountains in Glacier National Park, Thunderbird Mountain is composed of sedimentary rock laid down during the Precambrian to Jurassic periods. Formed in shallow seas, this sedimentary rock was initially uplifted beginning 170 million years ago when the Lewis Overthrust fault pushed an enormous slab of precambrian rocks 3 mi (4.8 km) thick, 50 miles (80 km) wide and 160 miles (260 km) long over younger rock of the cretaceous period.

== See also ==
- List of mountains and mountain ranges of Glacier National Park (U.S.)

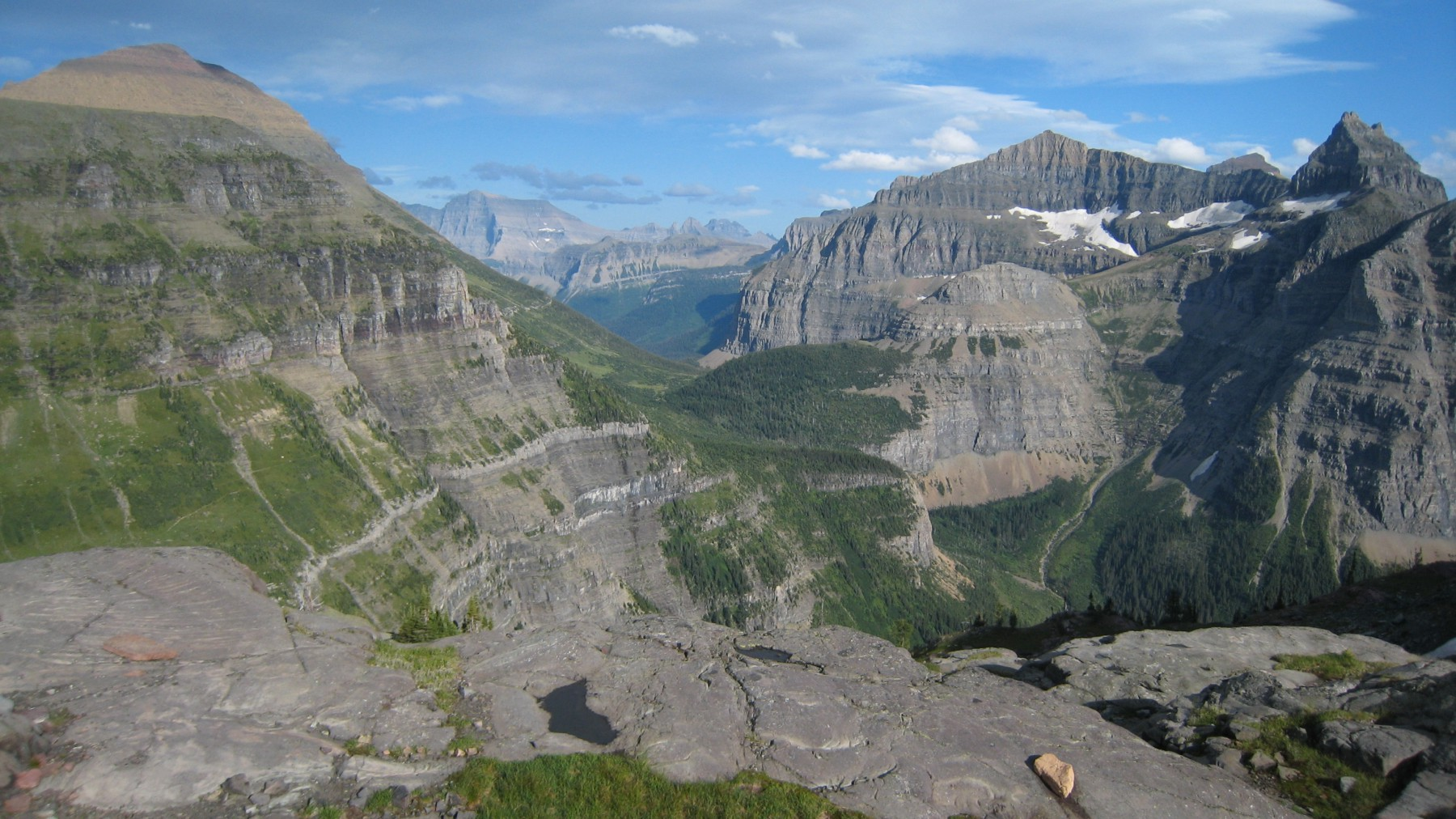
Thunderbird Mountain to right with Brown Pass centered
