= Piegan Mountain =

Mountain in Montana, United States

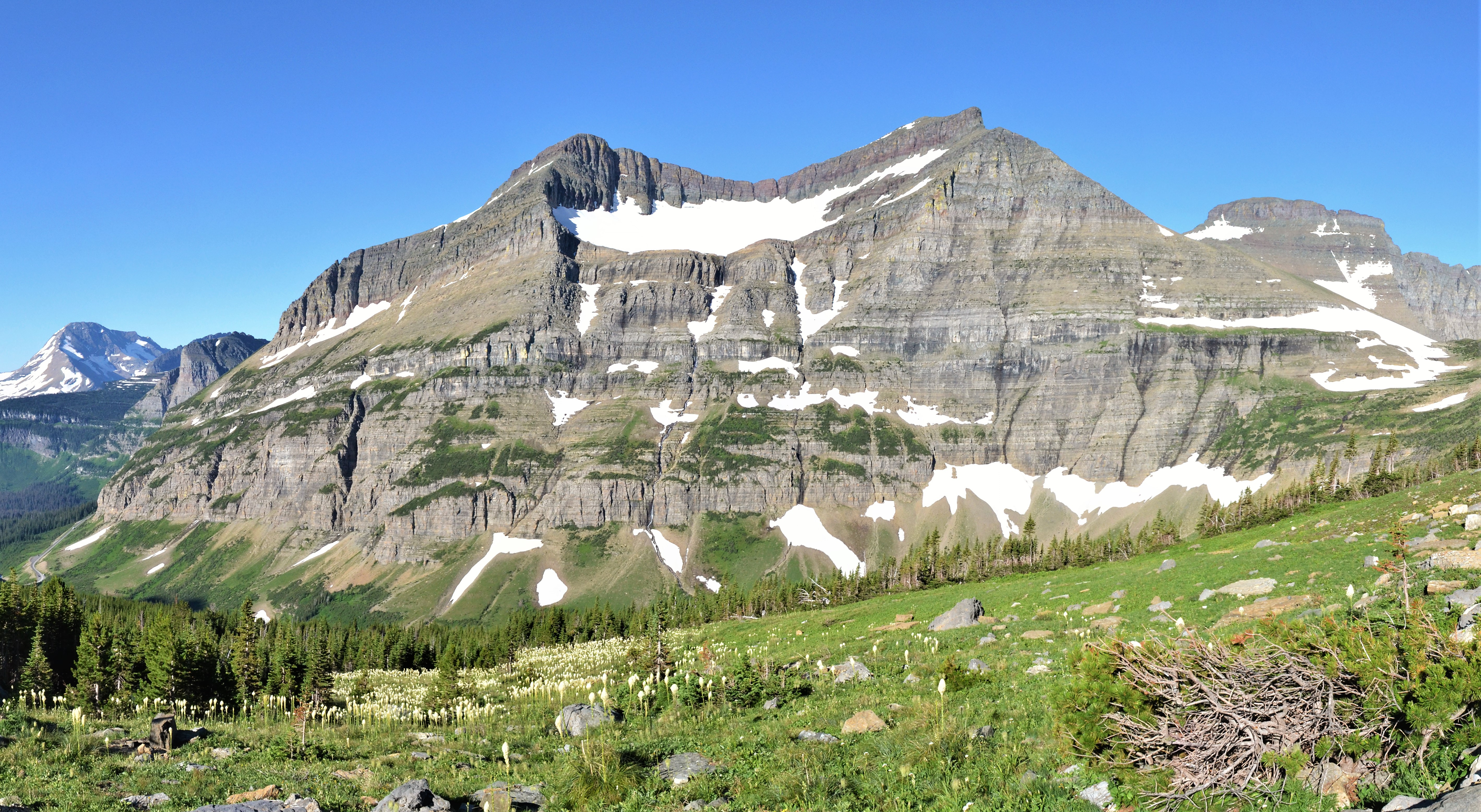
- Northeast aspect, with Piegan Glacier

Highest point
- Elevation: 9,225 ft (2,812 m)
- Prominence: 660 ft (200 m)
- Coordinates: 48°42′37″N 113°41′18″W

Geography
- Location within Montana Location within the United States
- Location: Glacier County, Montana, U.S.
- Parent range: Lewis Range
- Topo map(s): USGS Logan Pass, MT

Geology
- Rock age: Cambrian
- Rock type: Sedimentary rock

Piegan Mountain (9,225 feet (2,812 m)) is located in the Lewis Range, Glacier National Park in the U.S. state of Montana. Piegan Glacier is located in a cirque immediately southeast of the summit.

== Geology ==
Like other mountains in Glacier National Park, Piegan Mountain is composed of sedimentary rock laid down during the Precambrian to Jurassic periods. Formed in shallow seas, this sedimentary rock was initially uplifted beginning 170 million years ago when the Lewis Overthrust fault pushed an enormous slab of precambrian rocks 3 mi (4.8 km) thick, 50 miles (80 km) wide and 160 miles (260 km) long over younger rock of the cretaceous period.

== Climate ==
Based on the Köppen climate classification, it is located in an alpine subarctic climate zone with long, cold, snowy winters, and cool to warm summers. Temperatures can drop below −10 °F with wind chill factors below −30 °F.

== See also ==
- Mountains and mountain ranges of Glacier National Park (U.S.)
- Geology of the Rocky Mountains

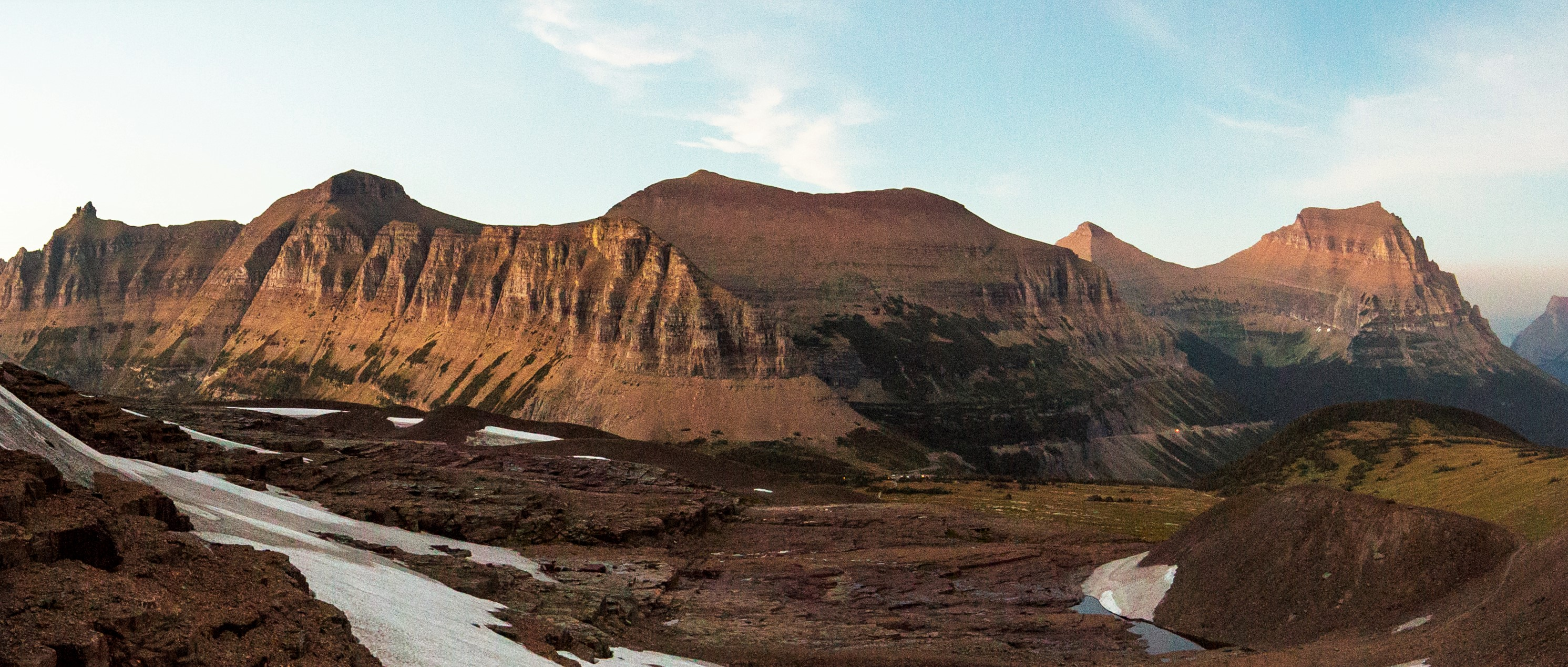
Bishops Cap, Pollock Mountain, Piegan Mountain (centered), Matahpi Peak, Going-to-the-Sun Mountain. Camera pointed east.
