= Whitecrow Glacier =

Glacier in Montana, United States

- Location within Montana
- Type: Mountain glacier
- Location: Glacier National Park, Glacier County, Montana, U.S.
- Coordinates: 48°55′19″N 113°50′08″W
- Area: Approximately 48 acres (0.19 km^{2}) in 2005
- Terminus: Barren rock
- Status: Retreating

Whitecrow Glacier is in Glacier National Park, U.S. state of Montana. The glacier is situated immediately east of Mount Cleveland at an average elevation of 7,000 feet (2,100 m) above sea level. Whitecrow Glacier is in a cirque and consists of numerous ice patches, covering a combined surface area of 48 acres (0.19 km^{2}). Between 1966 and 2005, Whitecrow Glacier lost over 47 percent of its surface area.

== See also ==
- List of glaciers in the United States
- Glaciers in Glacier National Park (U.S.)
