= Numa Peak =

Mountain in Montana, United States

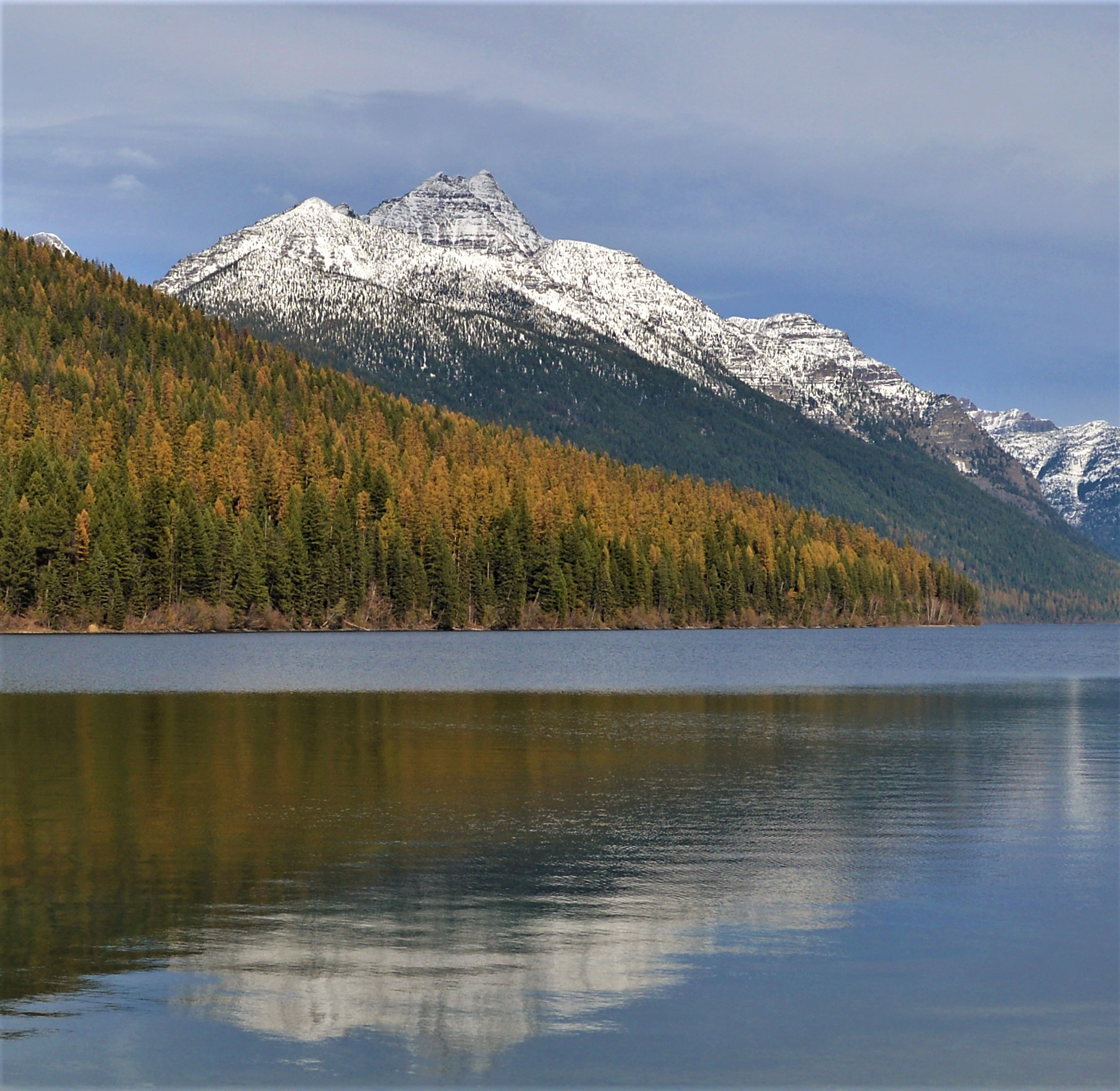
- Southwest aspect from Bowman Lake

Highest point
- Elevation: 9,007 ft (2,745 m)
- Prominence: 1,163 ft (354 m)
- Coordinates: 48°54′12″N 114°09′40″W

Geography
- Location within Montana Location within the United States
- Location: Flathead County, Montana, U.S.
- Parent range: Livingston Range
- Topo map(s): USGS Kintla Peak, MT

Climbing
- Easiest route: class 3

Numa Peak (9,007 feet (2,745 m)) is located in the Livingston Range, Glacier National Park in the U.S. state of Montana. The small Baby Glacier is below the peak to the immediate northeast. Numa Peak is the high point along Numa Ridge and rises almost 5,000 feet (1,500 m) above Bowman Lake.

== See also ==
- List of mountains and mountain ranges of Glacier National Park (U.S.)

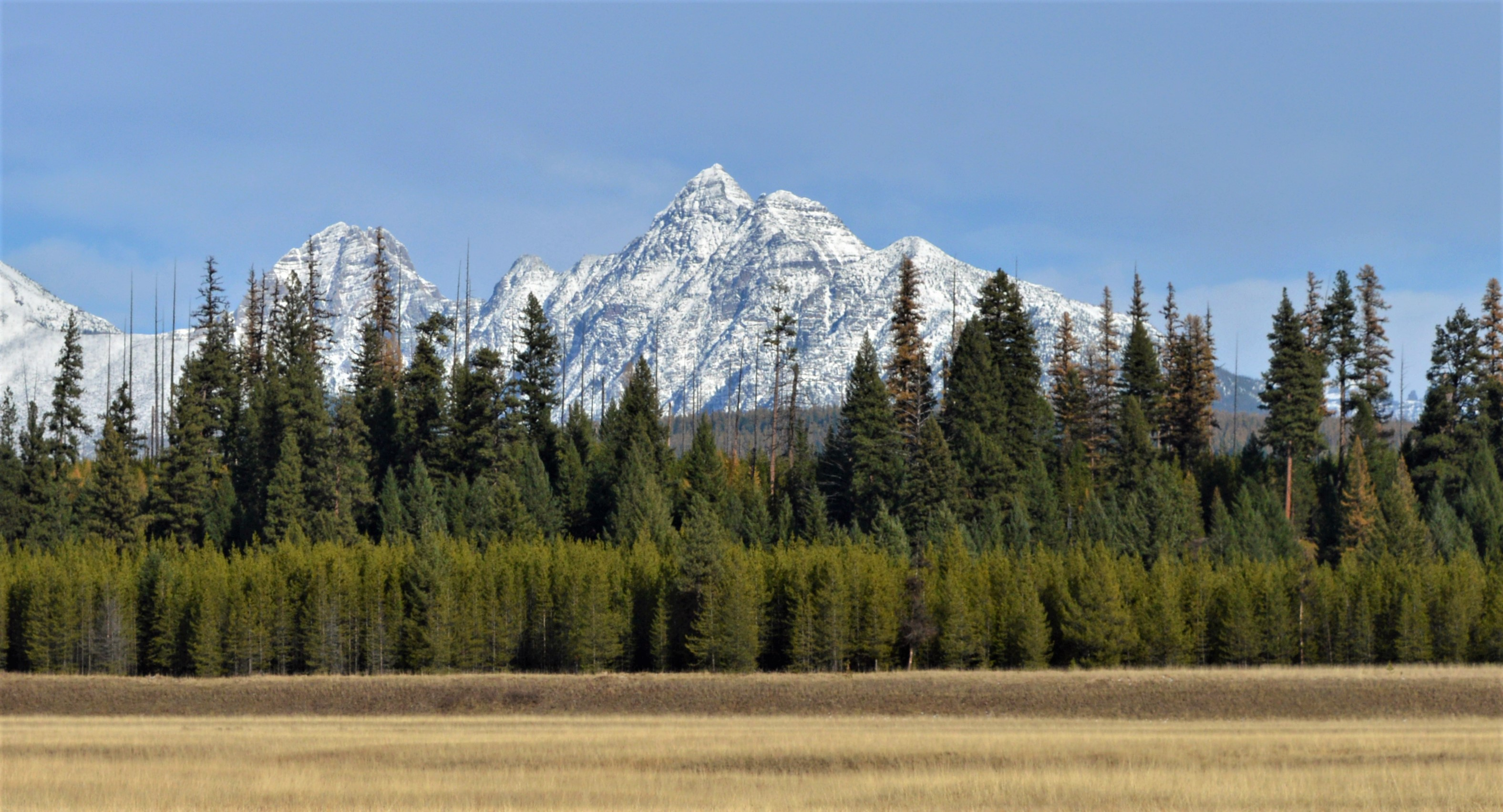
West aspect from Big Prairie
