= Mount Phillips (Montana) =

Mountain in Montana, United States

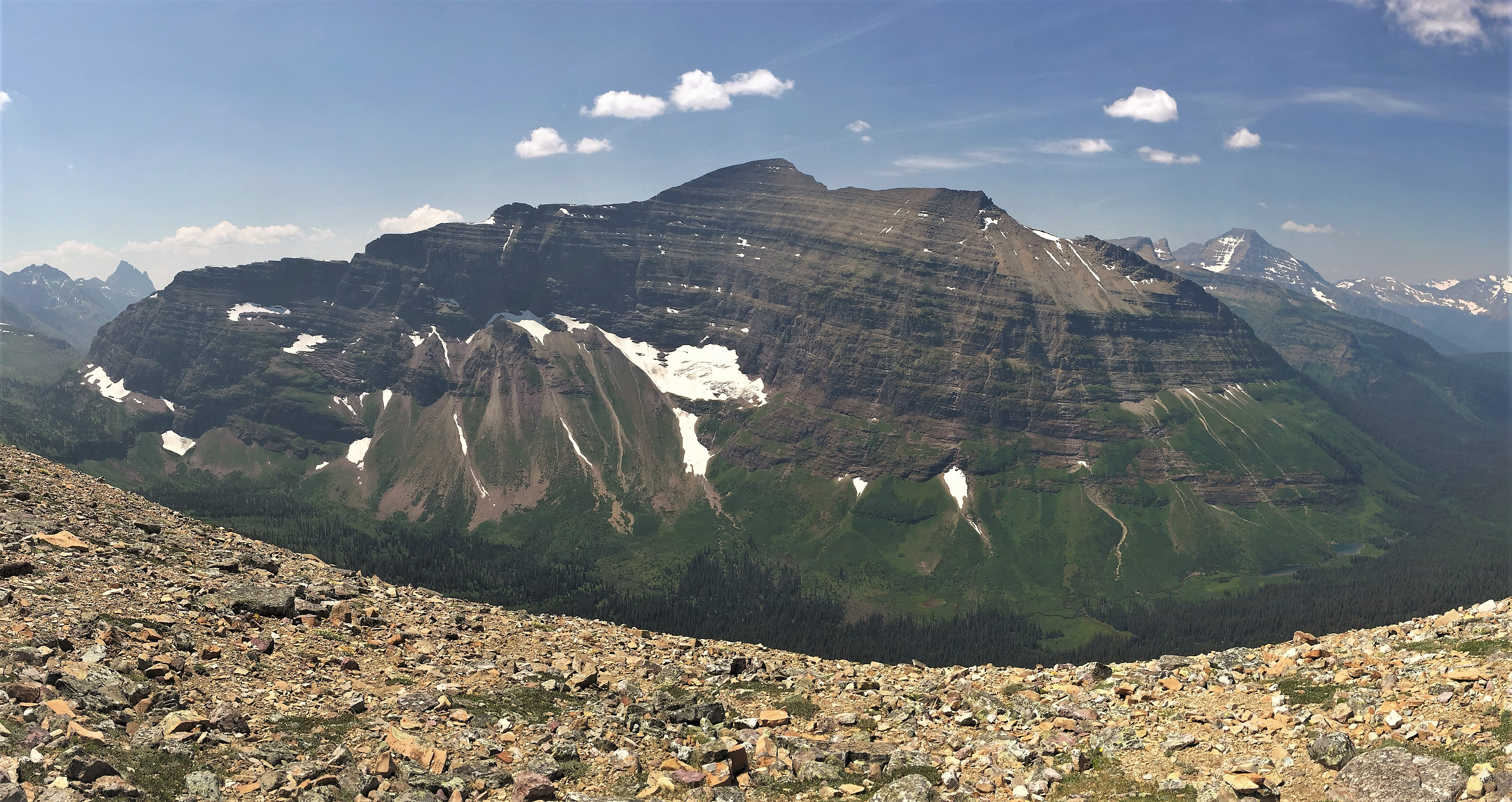
- East aspect, from Dawson Pass

Highest point
- Elevation: 9,498 ft (2,895 m)
- Prominence: 3,014 ft (919 m)
- Coordinates: 48°28′40″N 113°31′30″W

Geography
- Location within Montana Location within the United States
- Location: Flathead County, Montana, U.S.
- Parent range: Lewis Range
- Topo map(s): USGS Mount Saint Nicholas, MT

Mount Phillips (9,498 feet (2,895 m)) is located in the Lewis Range, Glacier National Park in the U.S. state of Montana. Lupfer Glacier is located on the east slope of Mount Phillips.

== Climate ==
Based on the Köppen climate classification, it is located in an alpine subarctic climate zone with long, cold, snowy winters, and cool to warm summers. Temperatures can drop below −10 °F with wind chill factors below −30 °F.

== Geology ==
Like other mountains in Glacier National Park, it is composed of sedimentary rock laid down during the Precambrian to Jurassic periods. Formed in shallow seas, this sedimentary rock was initially uplifted beginning 170 million years ago when the Lewis Overthrust fault pushed an enormous slab of precambrian rocks 3 mi (4.8 km) thick, 50 miles (80 km) wide and 160 miles (260 km) long over younger rock of the cretaceous period.

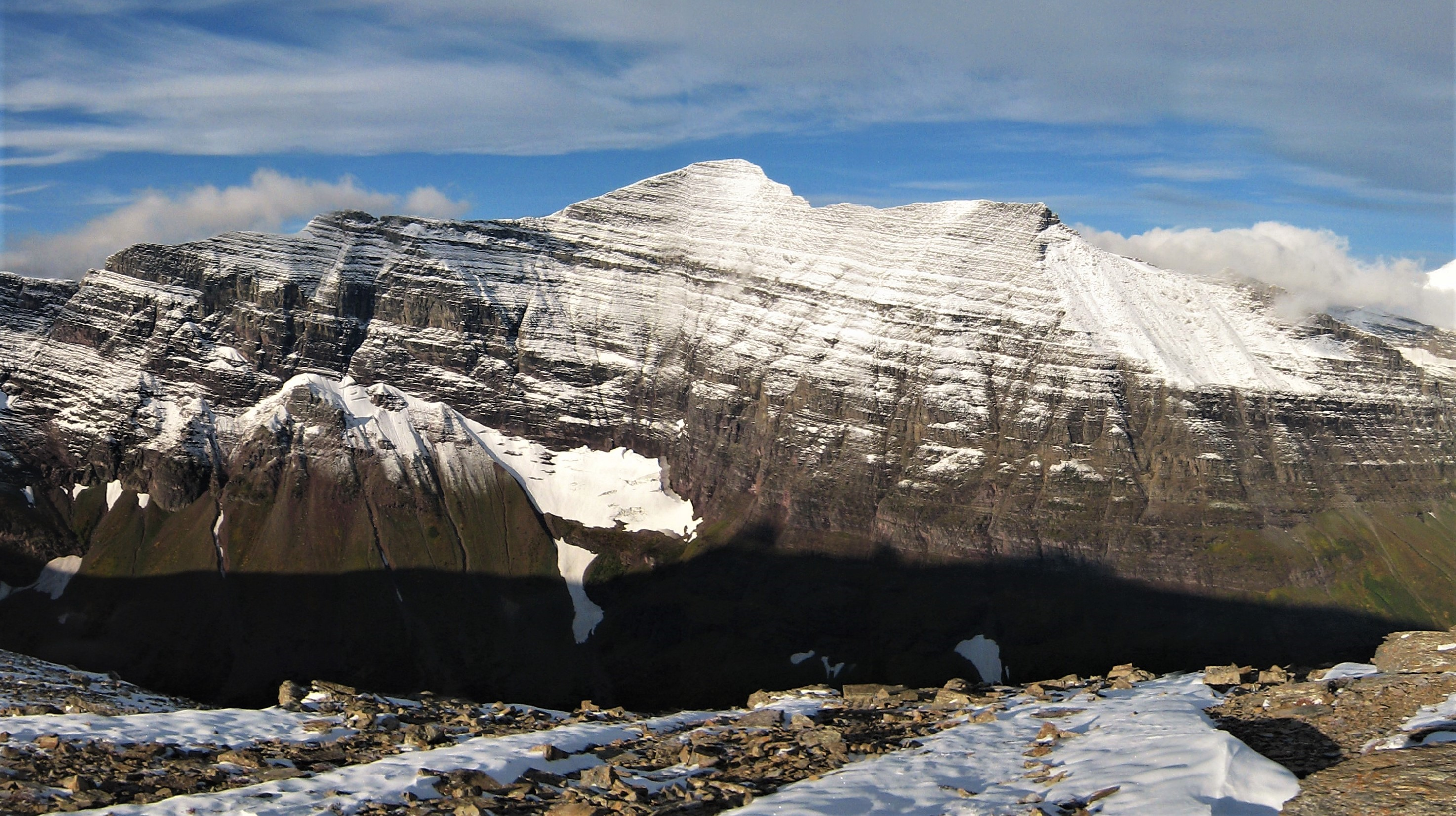
Mt. Phillips seen from Dawson Pass

== See also ==
- Mountains and mountain ranges of Glacier National Park (U.S.)
