= Glaciers in Glacier National Park (U.S.) =

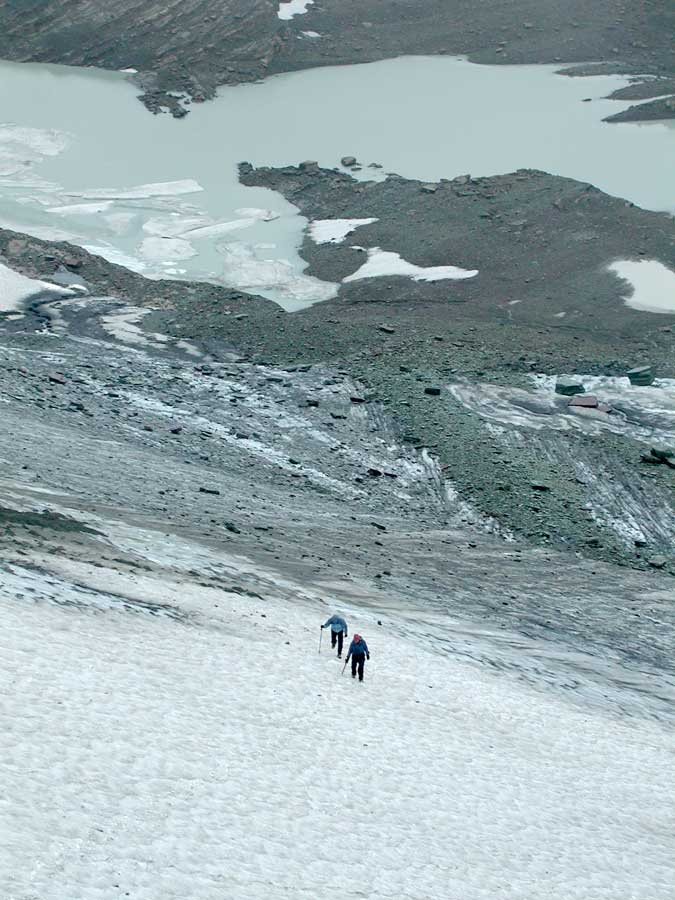
Chaney Glacier, 2004

Glacier National Park was named for its small active glaciers. Indigenous People have referred to the Glacier National Park area as “the place where there is a lot of ice.” Other Tribes describe the park as “the land of the shining mountains” because of the bright, reflective snow and ice seen from the plains to the east.

The earliest known mention of the park’s name is found in a 1906 exchange between George Bird Grinnell and glacial geologist, François E. Matthes. He wrote, “the park proposed would contain roughly 1500 sq. miles, containing upward of 50 ice-bodies and over 200 lakes. It might fitly be called Glacier Park.”

Once Glacier National Park was established in 1910, the US Geological Survey (USGS) began sending William C. Alden on annual expeditions into the park to survey and map the park’s glaciers and topography. In 1914, USGS published Alden’s report, The Glaciers of Glacier National Park. The first sentence of the report reads, “Glacier National Park derives its name and much of its interest from the presence of many small glaciers.”

== Number of glaciers in the park ==
The park contains dozens of bodies of ice, some that meet technical definitions of a glacier and some that do not. At least 35 of these ice bodies are officially named. Counting the number of glaciers requires defining which ice body deserves to be called a glacier. The USGS defines a glacier as a body of ice with an area of at least 0.1 kilometers^{2}. "Below this size, ice is generally stagnant and does not have enough mass to move.”

A 2019 study calculated that in the late 1800s, at the end of the Little Ice Age, there were 82 bodies of ice larger than 0.1 kilometers^{2}. If the definition of a glacier was expanded to 0.01 kilometers^{2} then there were 146 glaciers. The same study counted 34 glaciers larger than 0.1 kilometers^{2} in the year 2005.

A 2017 data release by the USGS counted the decline of named glaciers in the park. At the end of the Little Ice Age there were 35 glaciers (that are today officially named), in 1966 those same 35 remained, in 2005 seven had shrunk below 0.1 kilometers^{2}, leaving 27, and by 2015 there were 26 named bodies of ice large enough to be considered glaciers.

== Predictions of glacier disappearance ==
In 2003, researchers published an academic paper about two of the park's glaciers in the Journal of BioSciences. They used a geospatial computer model to predict the advance or retreat of Blackfoot Glacier and Jackson Glacier for each decade from 1990 to 2100 based on melting rates from historical data.

Since Blackfoot and Jackson are relatively large glaciers, some experts hypothesized that if those two glaciers were completely melted then all the other glaciers in the park likely would be as well. A few years later the researchers looked again at how fast Blackfoot and Jackson were shrinking and found that they seemed to be melting faster than they first predicted. Informally, the researchers moved their 2030 date up to 2020.

These predictive dates spread widely and were featured on various exhibits around the park. As 2020 approached, and scientific understanding of glacial melt advanced, the 2020 and 2030 prediction dates were removed.

A 2010 study estimated the rate of disappearance of one of the park's glaciers, Sperry Glacier. That study found that for each degree of global warming the glacier would disappear faster. The authors wrote, “under the most probable temperature increase...we conservatively estimate the glacier persisting through at least 2080.”

== Repeat photography of Glacier National Park's glaciers ==
The USGS started a Repeat Photography Project in 1997. The project collected historic photos of the park's glaciers and then took new photos of the glaciers from the same vantage.

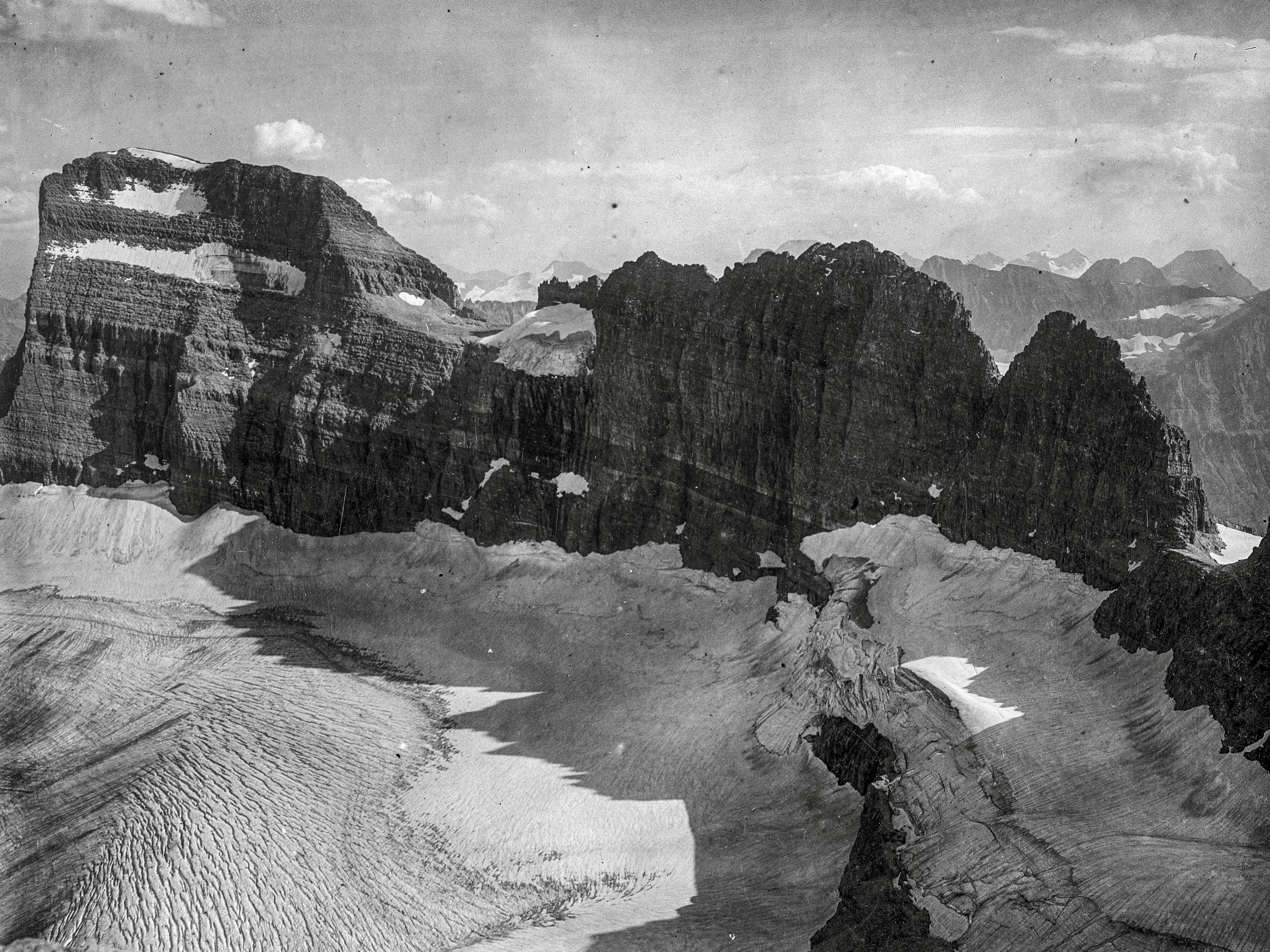
Grinnell Glacier from Upper Grinnell Ridge circa 1910

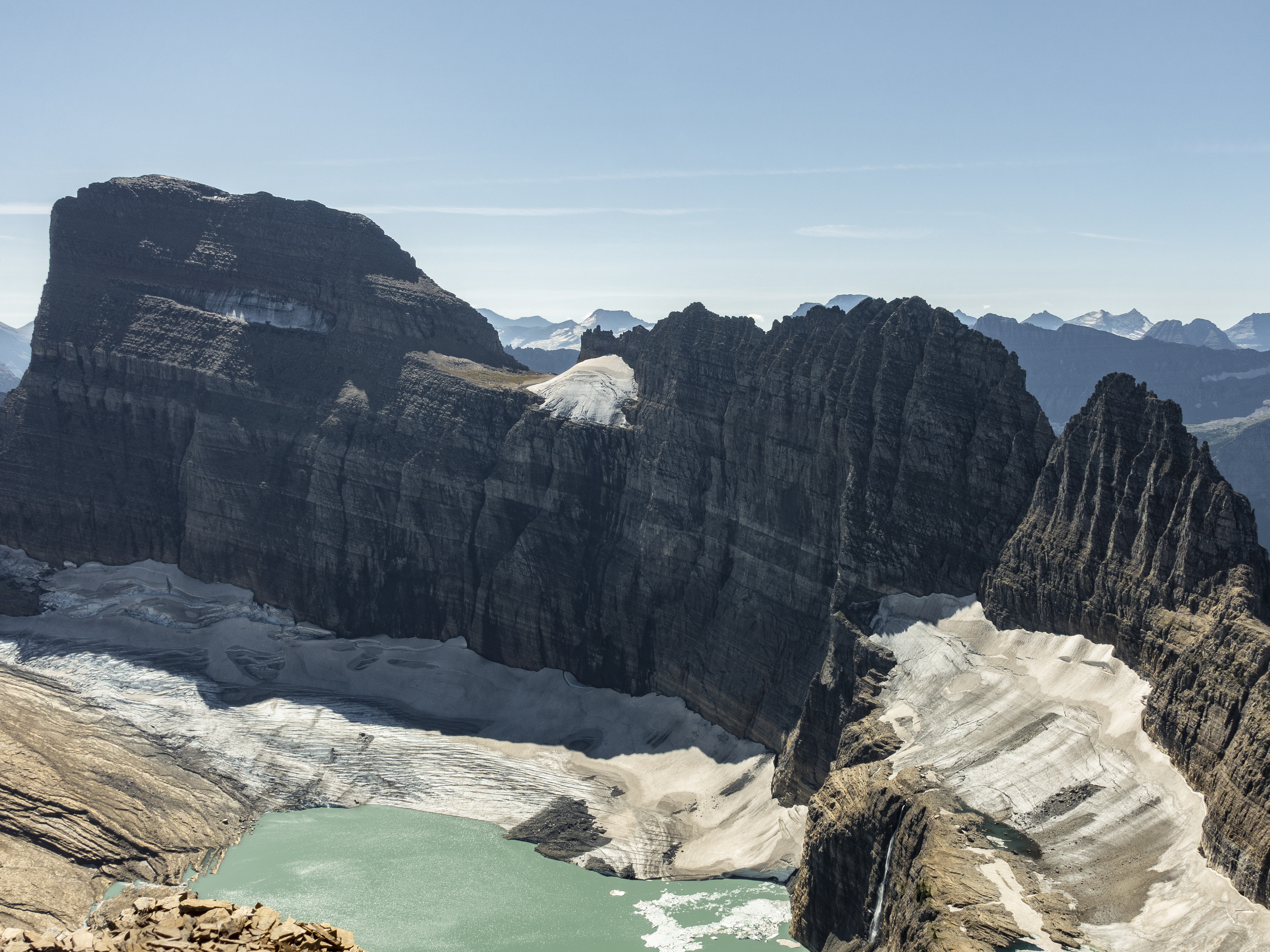
Grinnell Glacier from Upper Grinnell Ridge on August 29, 2021

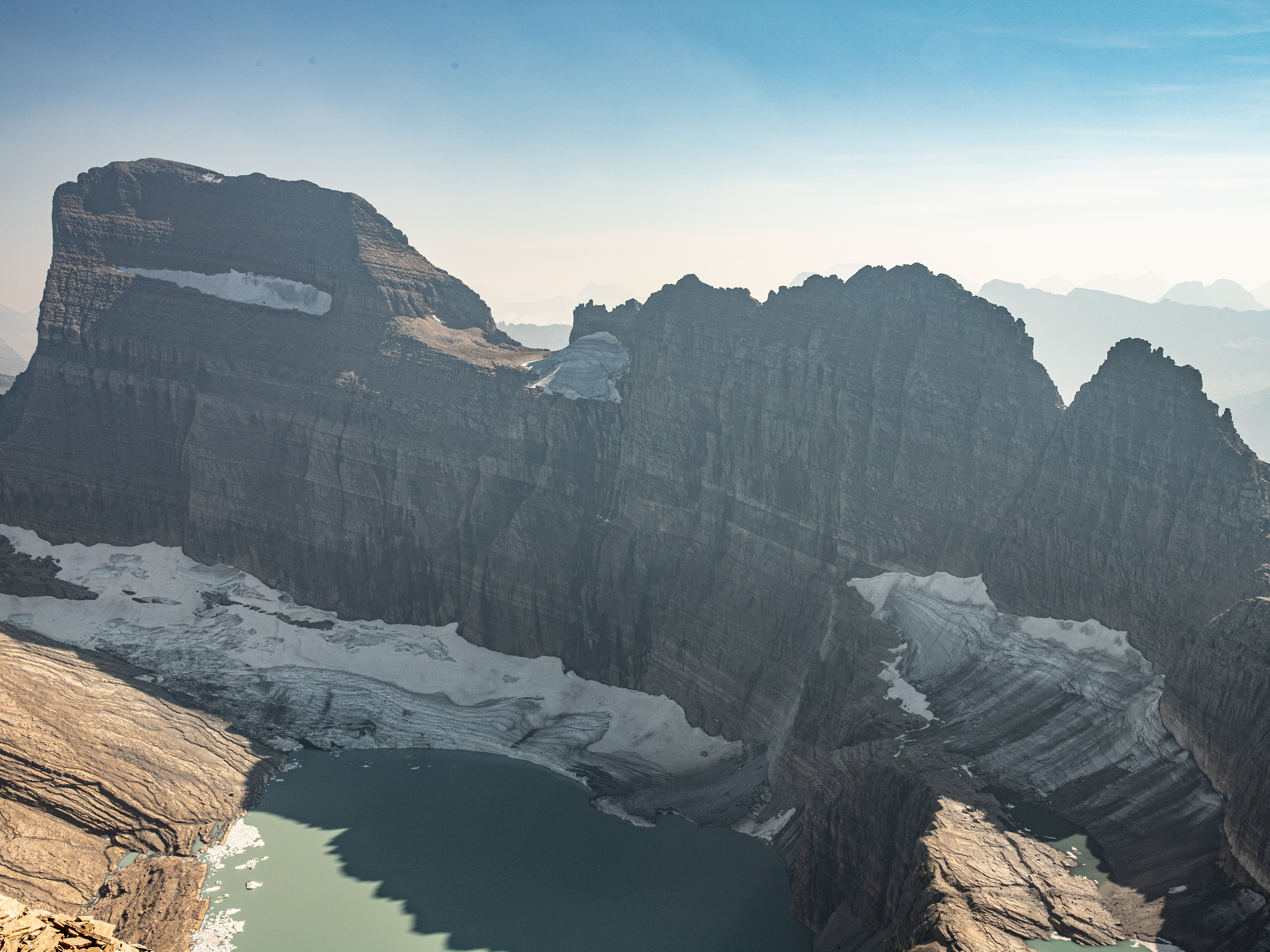
Grinnell Glacier from Upper Grinnell Ridge on September 6, 2025

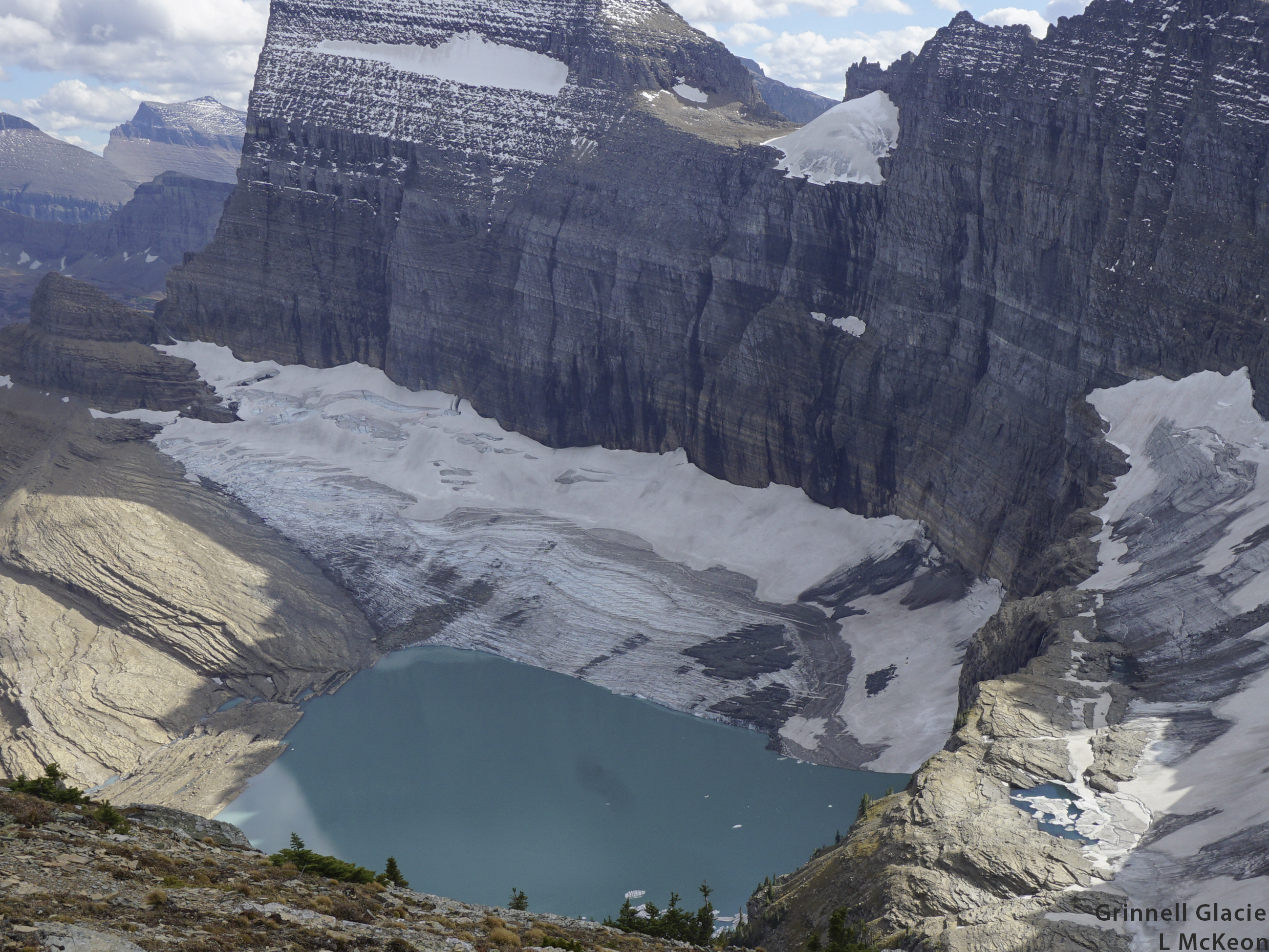
Grinnell Glacier from lower Grinnell Ridge on September 27, 2016

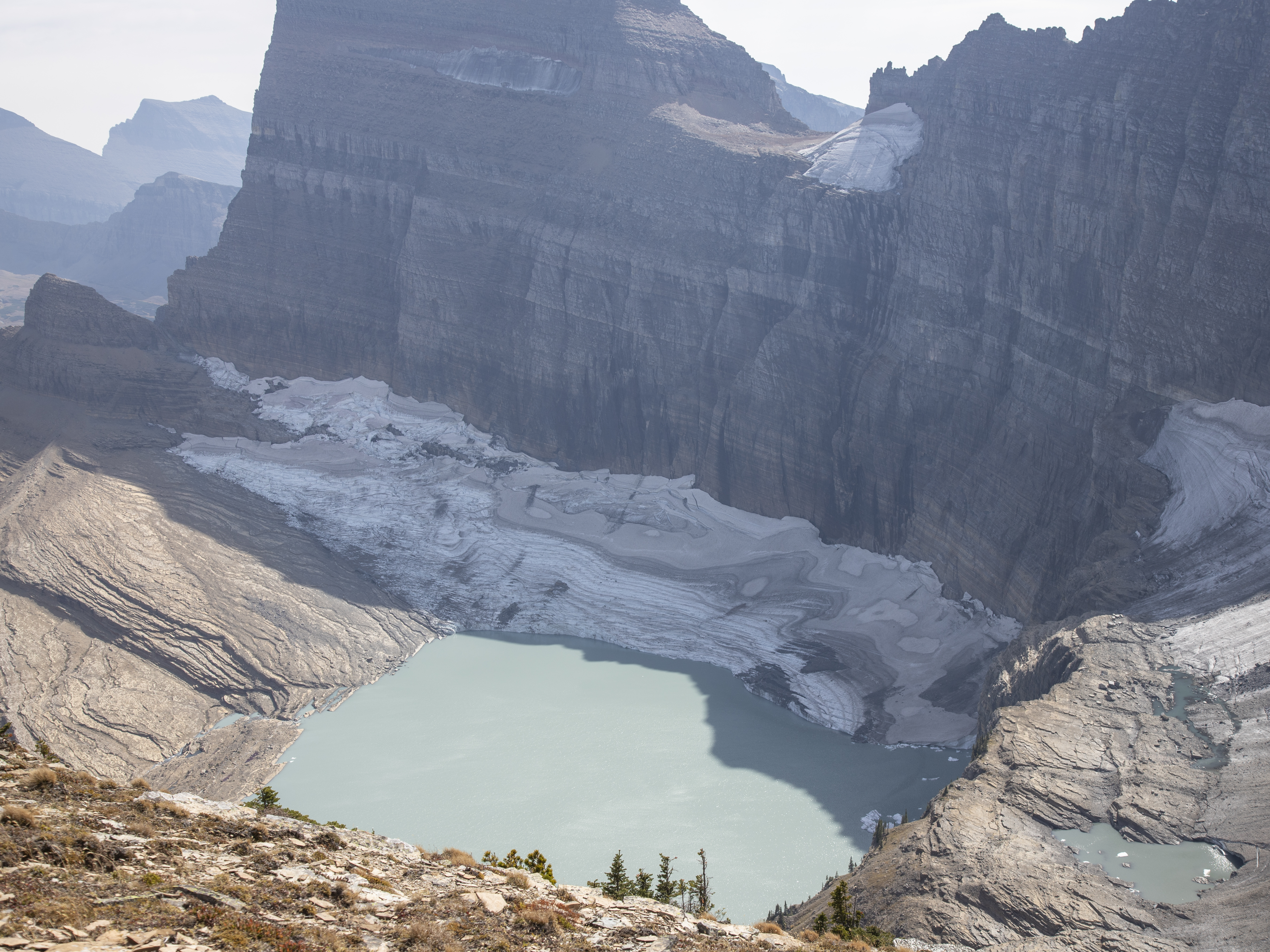
Grinnell Glacier from Lower Grinnell Ridge on September 16, 2023

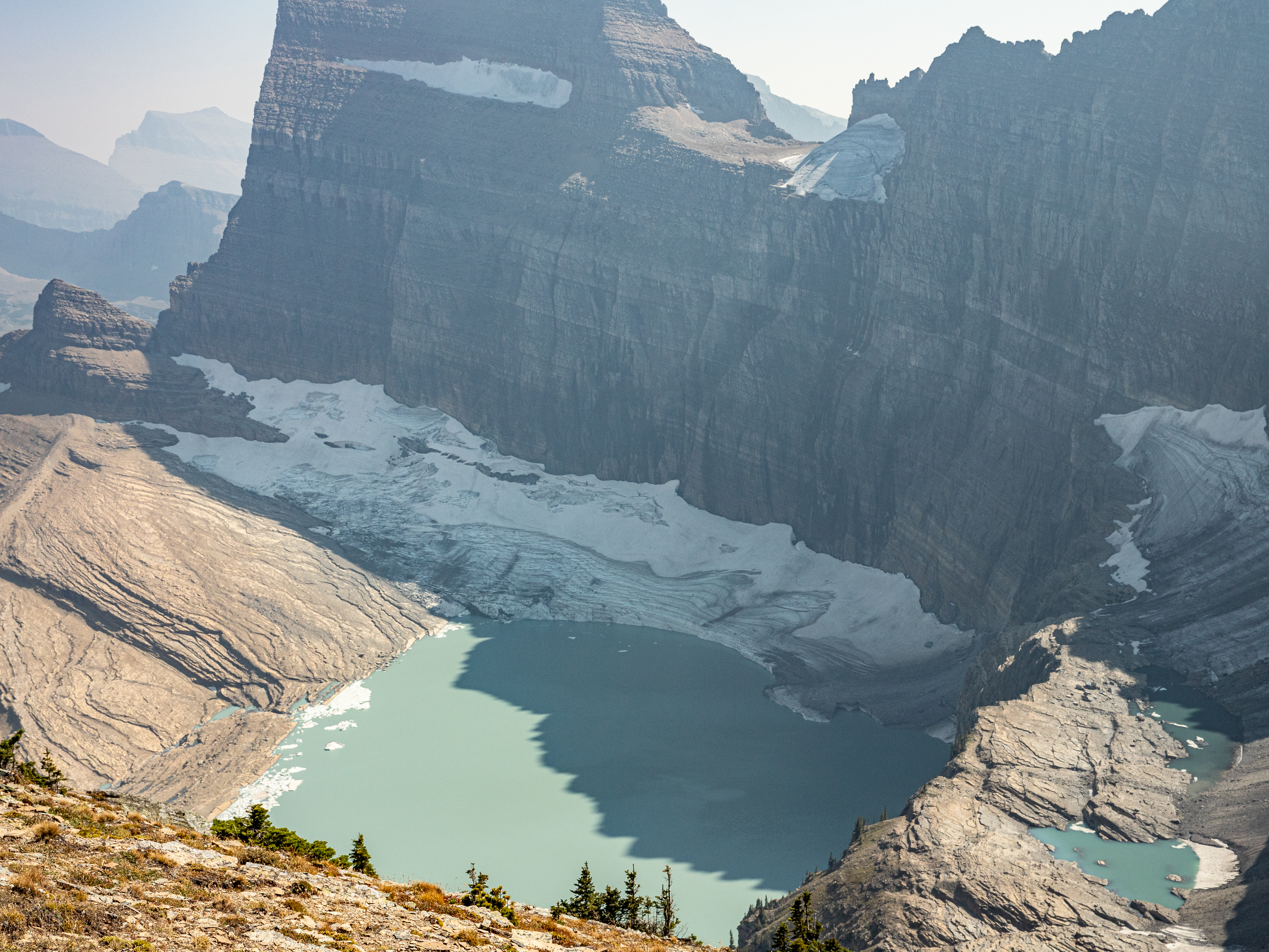
Grinnell Glacier from Lower Grinnell Ridge on September 6, 2025

== List of glaciers in Glacier National Park ==
- Agassiz Glacier – 48°55′58″N 114°09′34″W; 7,858 feet (2,395 m)
- Ahern Glacier – 48°50′32″N 113°47′01″W; 8,169 feet (2,490 m)

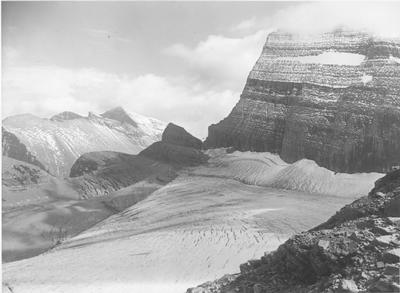
Black and white photo of Grinnell Glacier, Glacier National Park, Montana. Photo by T. J. Hileman ca. 1938. Part of James Willard Schultz Photos and Personal Papers Collection, Montana State University.

- Baby Glacier – 48°54′19″N 114°09′14″W; 6,804 feet (2,074 m)
- Blackfoot Glacier – 48°35′40″N 113°40′12″W; 7,513 feet (2,290 m)
- Boulder Glacier – 48°57′27″N 114°05′14″W; 7,762 feet (2,366 m)
- Carter Glaciers – 48°53′09″N 114°02′29″W; 7,605 feet (2,318 m)
- Chaney Glacier – 48°51′06″N 113°49′48″W; 7,408 feet (2,258 m)
- Dixon Glacier – 48°55′43″N 114°00′55″W; 7,480 feet (2,280 m)
- Gem Glacier – 48°44′48″N 113°43′40″W; 8,179 feet (2,493 m)
- Grinnell Glacier – 48°45′06″N 113°43′39″W; 6,686 feet (2,038 m)
- Harris Glacier – 48°56′57″N 114°13′45″W; 6,476 feet (1,974 m)
- Harrison Glacier – 48°35′34″N 113°43′49″W; 8,484 feet (2,586 m)
- Herbst Glacier – 48°59′11″N 114°03′05″W; 7,287 feet (2,221 m)
- Hudson Glacier – 48°57′54″N 114°02′40″W; 7,031 feet (2,143 m)
- Ipasha Glacier – 48°50′30″N 113°48′53″W; 7,736 feet (2,358 m)
- Jackson Glacier – 48°35′55″N 113°42′04″W; 7,310 feet (2,230 m)
- Kintla Glacier – 48°55′44″N 114°11′55″W; 7,785 feet (2,373 m)
- Logan Glacier – 48°36′07″N 113°38′00″W; 7,188 feet (2,191 m)
- Lupfer Glacier – 48°28′38″N 113°30′44″W; 6,217 feet (1,895 m)
- Miche Wabun Glacier – 48°56′51″N 113°50′03″W; 6,995 feet (2,132 m)
- North Swiftcurrent Glacier – 48°47′20″N 113°46′08″W; 7,169 feet (2,185 m)
- Old Sun Glacier – 48°52′21″N 113°46′38″W; 8,566 feet (2,611 m)
- Piegan Glacier – 48°42′29″N 113°41′02″W; 8,205 feet (2,501 m)
- Pumpelly Glacier – 48°35′00″N 113°39′33″W; 8,445 feet (2,574 m)
- Pumpkin Glacier – 48°35′03″N 113°39′27″W; 8,232 feet (2,509 m)
- Rainbow Glacier – 48°52′45″N 114°05′13″W; 8,222 feet (2,506 m)
- Red Eagle Glacier – 48°35′34″N 113°37′08″W; 7,044 feet (2,147 m)
- The Salamander Glacier – 48°45′29″N 113°44′18″W; 7,231 feet (2,204 m)
- Sexton Glacier – 48°42′06″N 113°38′06″W; 7,303 feet (2,226 m)
- Shepard Glacier – 48°51′51″N 113°51′34″W; 7,595 feet (2,315 m)
- Siyeh Glacier – 48°43′52″N 113°39′17″W; 7,073 feet (2,156 m)
- Sperry Glacier – 48°37′23″N 113°45′44″W; 8,022 feet (2,445 m)
- Swiftcurrent Glacier – 48°46′04″N 113°44′41″W; 7,411 feet (2,259 m)
- Thunderbird Glacier – 48°56′03″N 114°02′23″W; 7,516 feet (2,291 m)
- Two Ocean Glacier – 48°49′57″N 114°00′41″W; 8,015 feet (2,443 m)
- Vulture Glacier – 48°49′36″N 114°01′20″W; 8,172 feet (2,491 m)
- Weasel Collar Glacier – 48°53′40″N 114°03′52″W; 7,185 feet (2,190 m)
- Whitecrow Glacier – 48°55′19″N 113°50′08″W; 6,952 feet (2,119 m)

== See also ==
- Mountains and mountain ranges of Glacier National Park (U.S.)
