= Sexton Glacier =

Glacier in Montana, United States

- Location within Montana
- Type: Mountain glacier
- Location: Glacier National Park, Glacier County, Montana, U.S.
- Coordinates: 48°42′06″N 113°38′06″W
- Area: Approximately 68 acres (0.28 km^{2}) in 2005
- Terminus: Barren rock
- Status: Retreating

Sexton Glacier is located in the U.S. state of Montana in Glacier National Park. The glacier is situated in a cirque north of Going-to-the-Sun Mountain and on the southeast slope of Matahpi Peak at an elevation between 8,000 feet (2,400 m) and 7,000 feet (2,100 m) above sea level. The glacier covers an area of approximately 68 acres (0.28 km^{2}) and lost over 30 percent of its surface area between 1966 and 2005.

== See also ==
- List of glaciers in the United States
- Glaciers in Glacier National Park (U.S.)
