= Herbst Glacier =

Glacier in Montana, United States

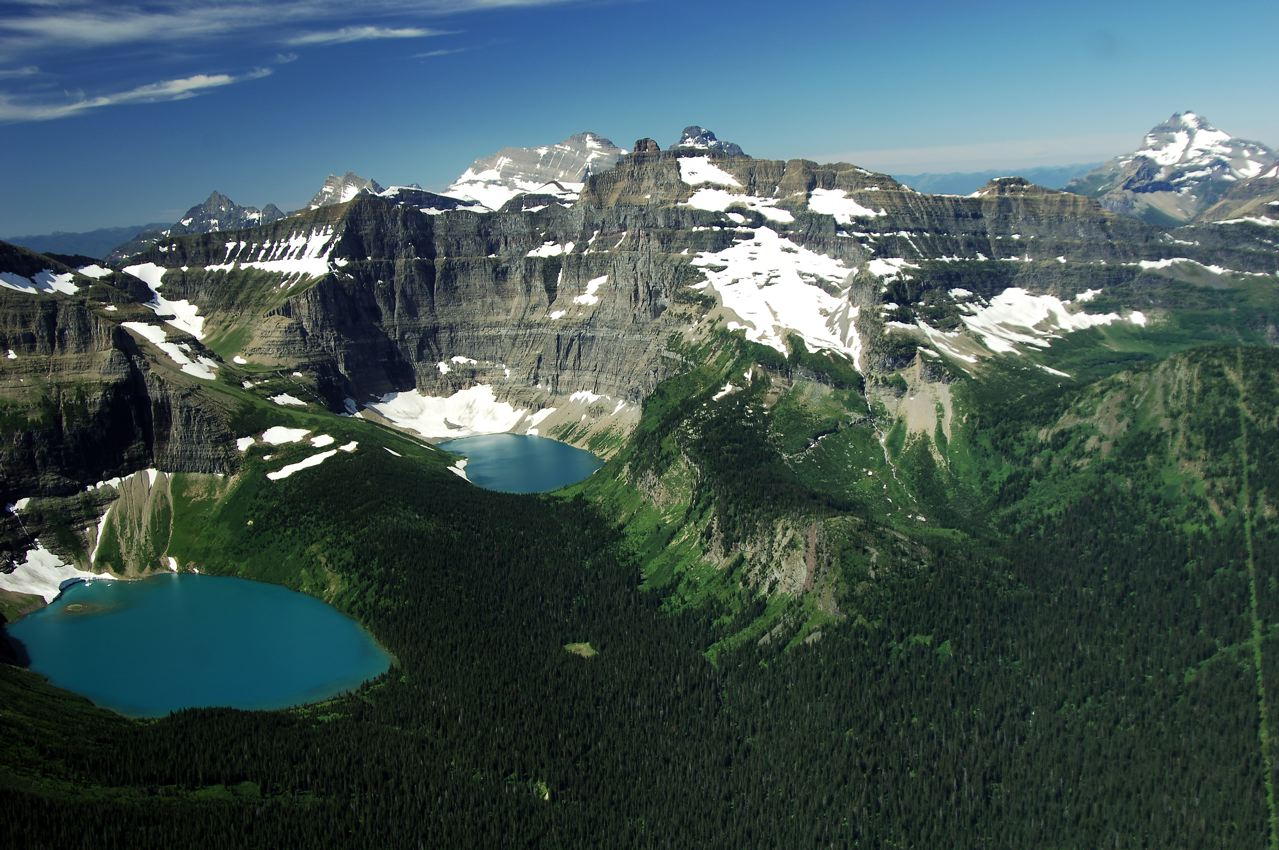
- Herbst Glacier is the snowy expanse at center right

- Location within Montana
- Type: Mountain glacier
- Location: Glacier National Park, Glacier County, Montana, U.S.
- Coordinates: 48°59′10″N 114°03′00″W
- Area: Approximately 13 acres (5.3 ha) in 2005
- Terminus: Moraine and talus
- Status: Retreating

Herbst Glacier is located in the US state of Montana in Glacier National Park. The glacier is northeast of Mount Custer and lies above Lake Nooney at an elevation between 7,000 ft (2,100 m) and 8,000 ft (2,400 m) above sea level. Immediately east of the Continental Divide, the glacier covers an area of approximately 13 acres (5.3 ha) and does not meet the threshold of 25 acres (10 ha) often cited as being the minimum size to qualify as an active glacier. Between 1966 and 2005, the glacier lost almost 70 percent of its acreage.

== See also ==
- List of glaciers in the United States
- Glaciers in Glacier National Park (U.S.)
