= Lupfer Glacier =

Glacier in Montana, United States

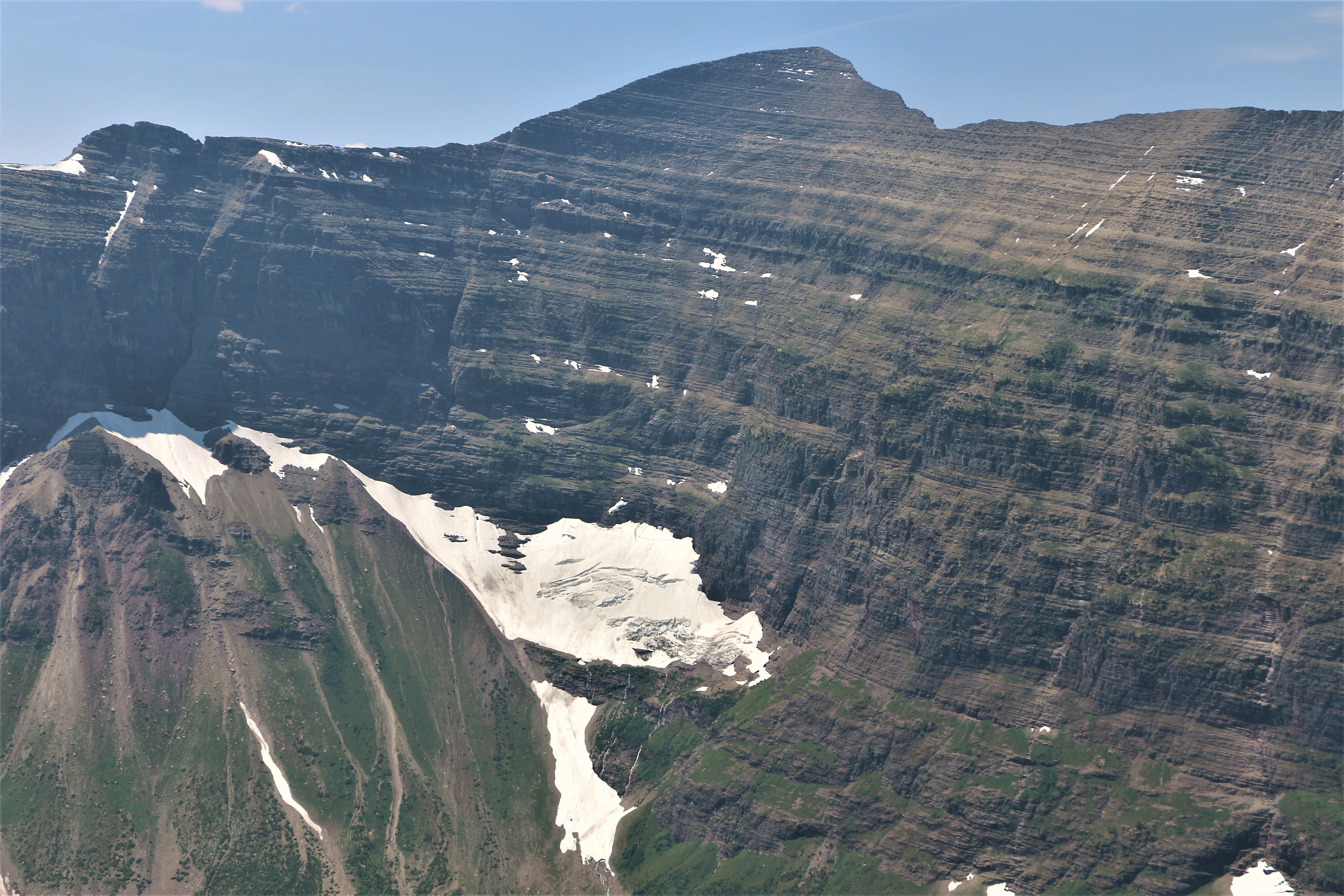
- Lupfer Glacier on east aspect of Mt. Phillips

- Location within Montana
- Type: Mountain glacier
- Location: Glacier National Park, Flathead County, Montana, United States
- Coordinates: 48°28′38″N 113°30′44″W
- Area: Approximately 16 acres (0.065 km^{2})
- Length: .15 mi (0.24 km)
- Terminus: Talus
- Status: Retreating

Lupfer Glacier is in Glacier National Park in the U.S. state of Montana. The glacier is situated immediately to the east of Mount Phillips at an elevation between 6,500 ft (2,000 m) and 6,000 ft (1,800 m) above sea level. Lupfer Glacier covers an area of approximately 16 acres (0.065 km^{2}) and does not meet the threshold of 25 acres (0.10 km^{2}) often cited as being the minimum size to qualify as an active glacier. Between 1966 and 2005 Lupfer Glacier lost over 50 percent of its surface area.

== See also ==
- List of glaciers in the United States
- Glaciers in Glacier National Park (U.S.)
