= Kintla Glacier =

Glacier in the United States

- Location within Montana
- Type: Mountain glacier
- Location: Glacier National Park, Flathead County, Montana, United States
- Coordinates: 48°55′44″N 114°11′55″W
- Area: Approximately 280 acres (1.1 km^{2}) in 2005
- Length: .35 mi (0.56 km)
- Terminus: Moraine and talus
- Status: Retreating

Kintla Glacier is in Glacier National Park in the U.S. state of Montana. The glacier is situated on a plateau 2 miles (3.2 km) southwest of Kintla Peak at an elevation between 8,700 feet (2,700 m) and 7,700 feet (2,300 m) above sea level. The glacier has numerous crevasses and is actually two glaciers with a combined area of 280 acres (110 ha) as of 2005, a 34 percent decrease in area from 1966.

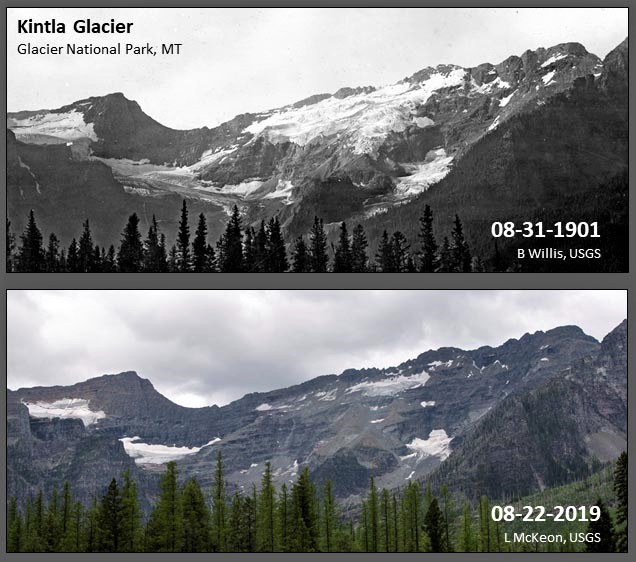
Kintla Glacier 1901 vs 2019

== See also ==
- List of glaciers in the United States
- Glaciers in Glacier National Park (U.S.)
