= Two Ocean Glacier =

Glacier in Montana, United States

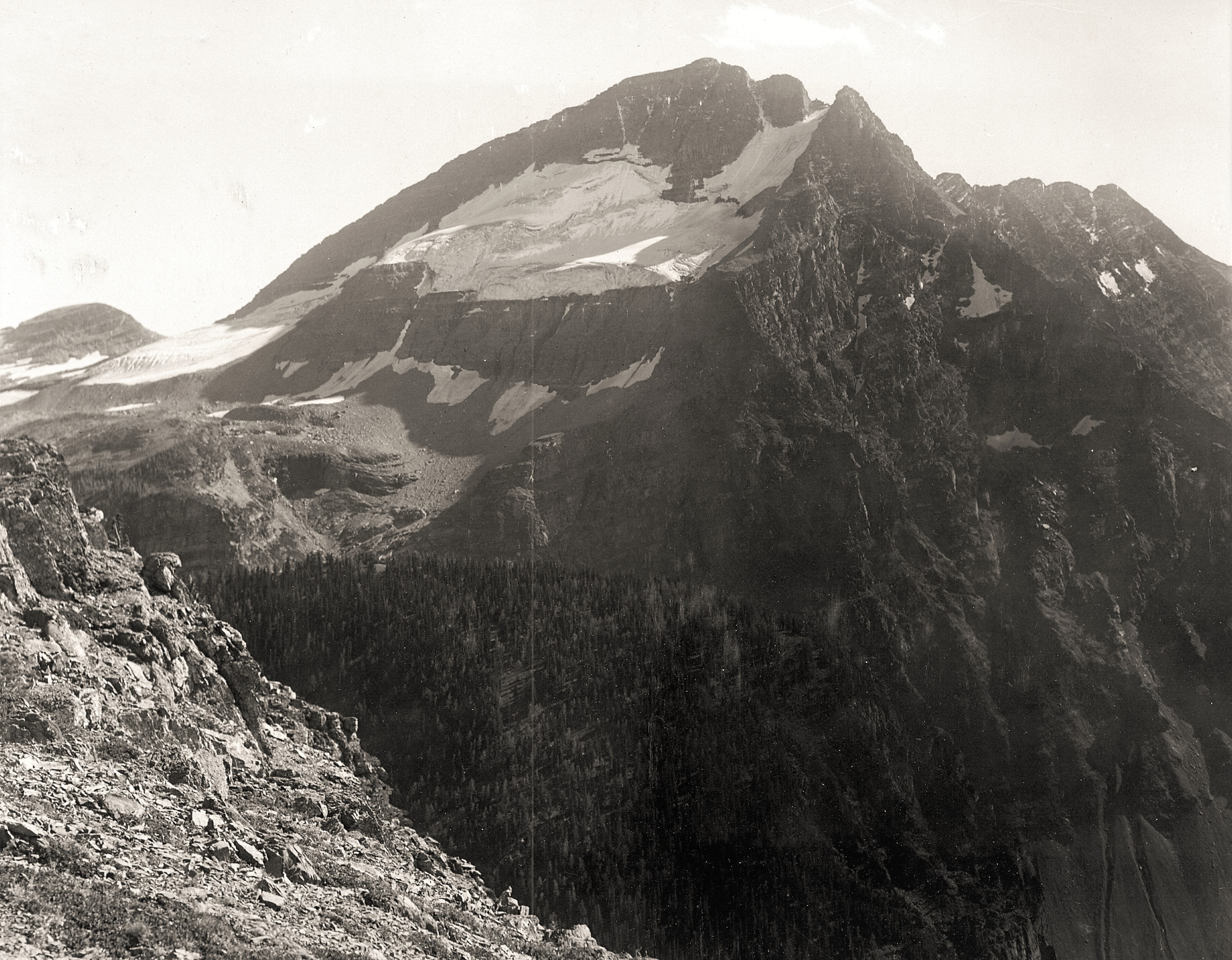
- Two Ocean Glacier, 1913

- Location within Montana
- Type: Mountain glacier
- Location: Glacier National Park, Flathead County, Montana, United States
- Coordinates: 48°49′57″N 114°00′41″W
- Area: Approximately 67 acres (0.27 km^{2}) in total including numerous ice patches
- Length: .20 mi (0.32 km)
- Terminus: Talus
- Status: Retreating

Two Ocean Glacier is in Glacier National Park in the U.S. state of Montana. The glacier is situated on the west side Continental Divide below Vulture Peak at an average elevation of 8,400 feet (2,600 m) above sea level. As of 2005, Two Ocean Glacier consisted of numerous ice patches covering a total of 67 acres (0.27 km^{2}) and is more than 35 percent smaller than it was in 1966.

== See also ==
- List of glaciers in the United States
- Glaciers in Glacier National Park (U.S.)
