= Dixon Glacier =

Glacier in Montana, United States

- Location within Montana
- Type: Mountain glacier
- Location: Glacier National Park, Glacier County, Montana, U.S.
- Coordinates: 48°55′44″N 114°00′56″W
- Area: 59 acres (0.24 km^{2}) in 2005
- Length: .30 mi (0.48 km)
- Terminus: Moraine and talus
- Status: Retreating

Dixon Glacier is located in the U.S. state of Montana in Glacier National Park. The glacier is situated in a cirque immediately to the north of The Sentinel at an elevation between 8,500 feet (2,600 m) and 7,400 feet (2,300 m) above sea level. Immediately east of the Continental Divide, the glacier is 1 mi (1.6 km) east of Thunderbird Glacier. Dixon Glacier covers an area of approximately 59 acres (0.24 km^{2}) and between 1966 and 2005 lost over 45 percent of its surface area.

== See also ==
- List of glaciers in the United States
- Glaciers in Glacier National Park (U.S.)
