= Swiftcurrent Glacier =

Glacier in Montana, United States

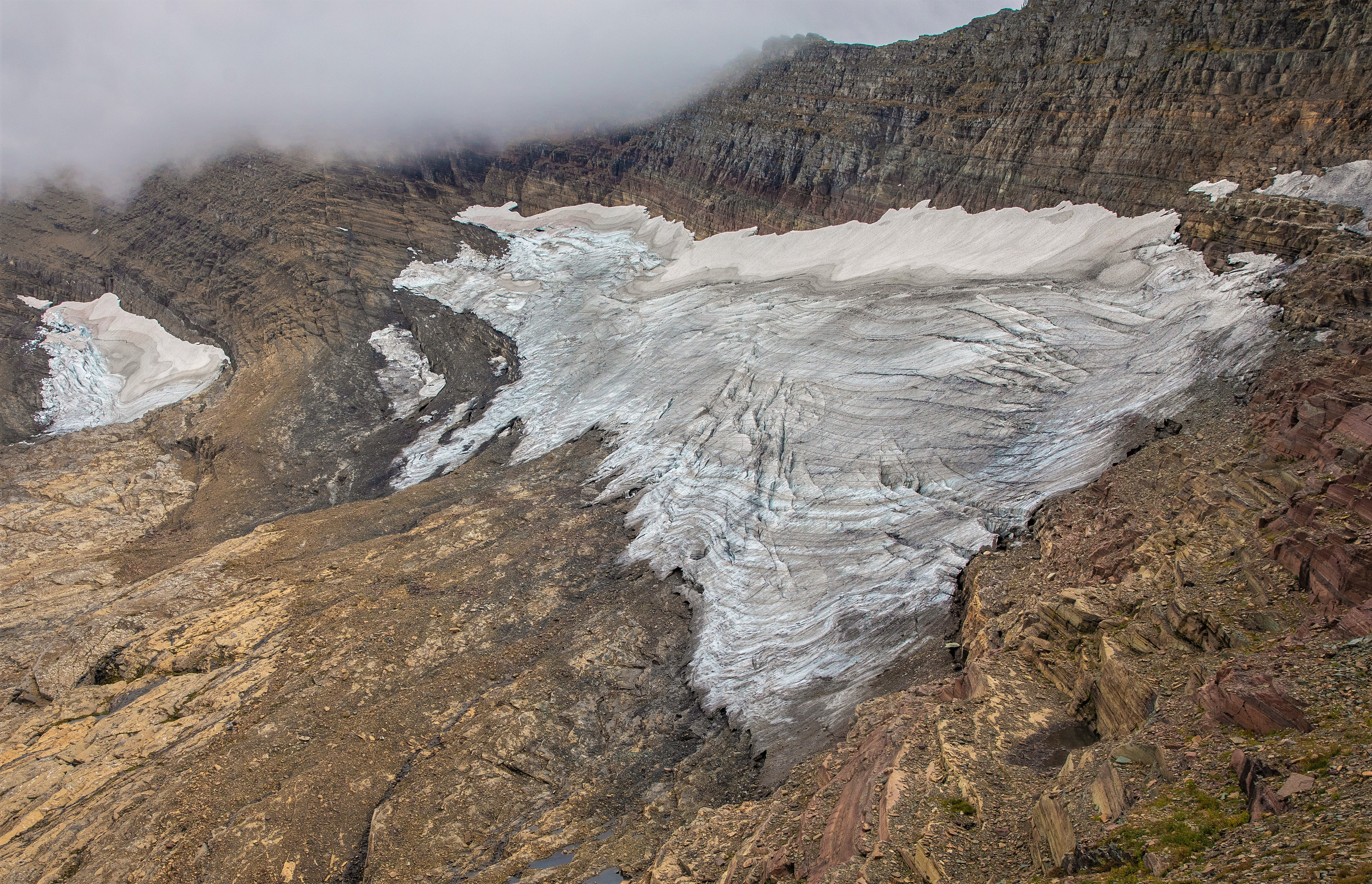
- Swiftcurrent Glacier in September 2019

- Location within Montana
- Type: Cirque glacier
- Location: Glacier National Park, Glacier County, Montana, U.S.
- Coordinates: 48°46′07″N 113°44′50″W
- Area: 55.233 acres (223,520 m^{2})in 2005
- Status: Retreating

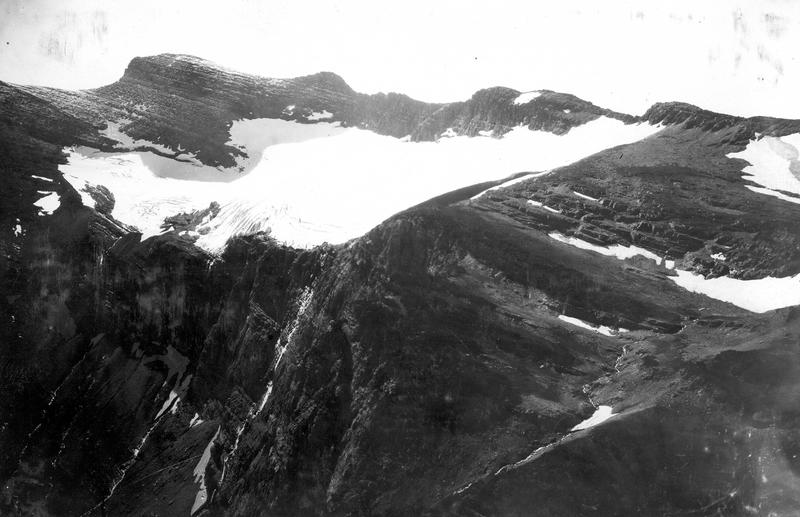
Swiftcurrent Glacier as Photographed circa. 1911

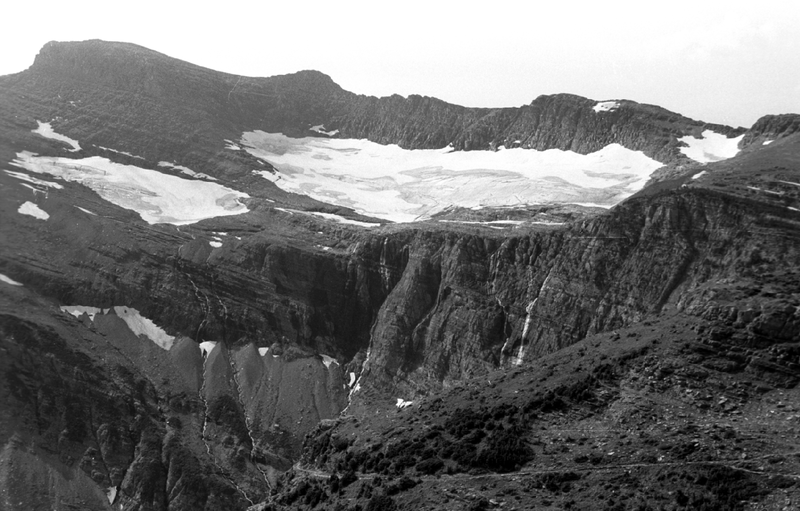
Swiftcurrent Glacier as Photographed in 1998

Swiftcurrent Glacier is in Glacier National Park in the U.S. state of Montana.The glacier is on the east (Glacier County) side of the Continental Divide arête known as the Garden Wall. Swiftcurrent Glacier is one of several glaciers that are being monitored to determine stream flow alterations that occur due to glacial retreat. Compared to other glaciers in Glacier National Park, Swiftcurrent Glacier has experienced relatively slow retreat. As of 2005, the glacier had an area of 55 acres (0.22 km^{2}), a 14 percent reduction since 1966.

== See also ==
- List of glaciers in the United States
- Glaciers in Glacier National Park (U.S.)
