= Vulture Peak (Montana) =

Mountain in the American state of Montana

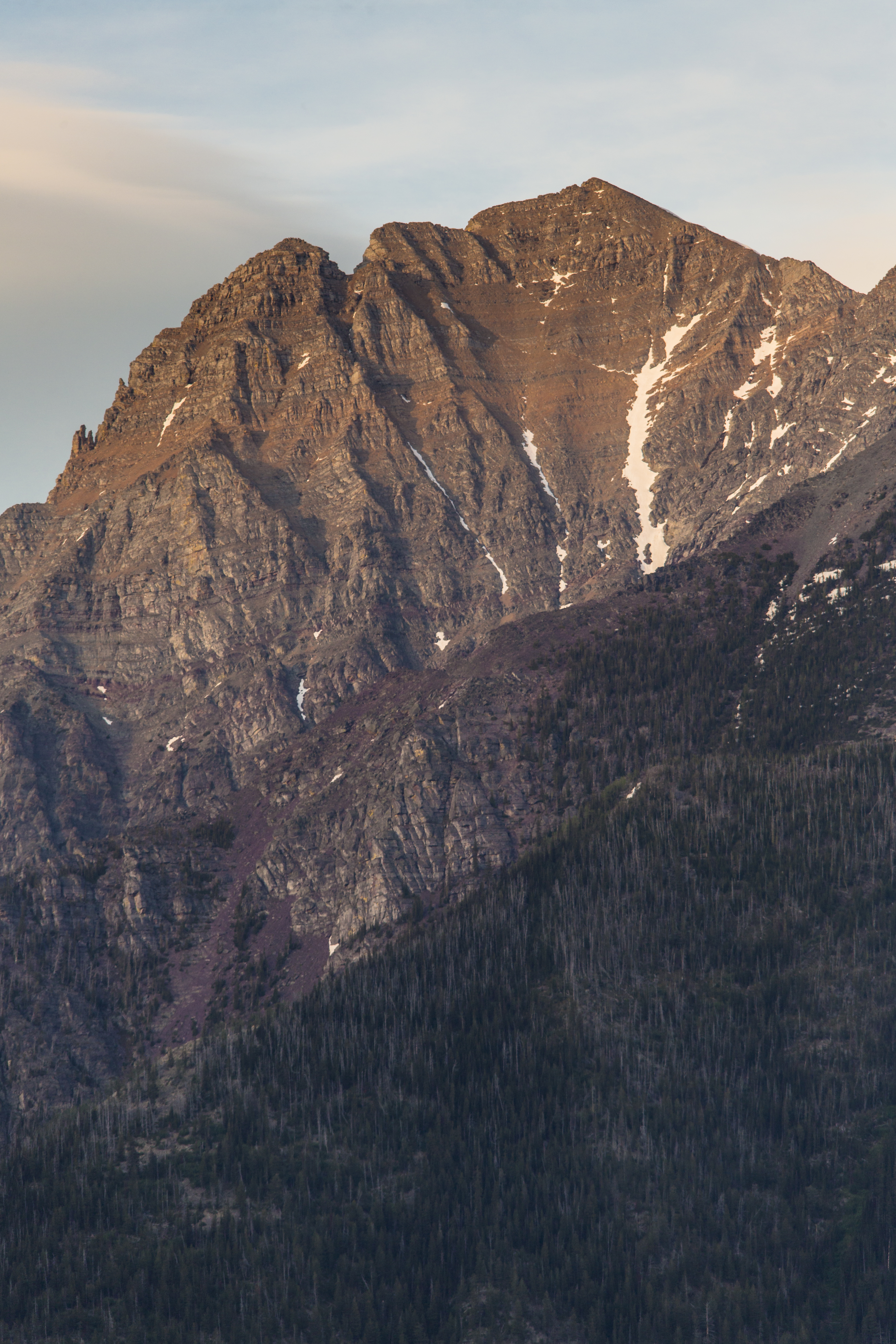

Highest point
- Elevation: 9,642 ft (2,939 m)
- Prominence: 2,278 ft (694 m)
- Coordinates: 48°50′14″N 114°01′26″W

Geography
- Location within Montana Location within the United States
- Location: Flathead County, Montana, U.S.
- Parent range: Livingston Range
- Topo map(s): USGS Vulture Peak, MT

Vulture Peak (9,642 feet (2,939 m)) is located in the Livingston Range, Glacier National Park in the U.S. state of Montana. The Vulture Glacier is located on the southern flanks of the mountain, while the Two Ocean Glacier is immediately to the north. Vulture Peak is the thirteenth highest summit in Glacier National Park.

== See also ==
- List of mountains and mountain ranges of Glacier National Park (U.S.)

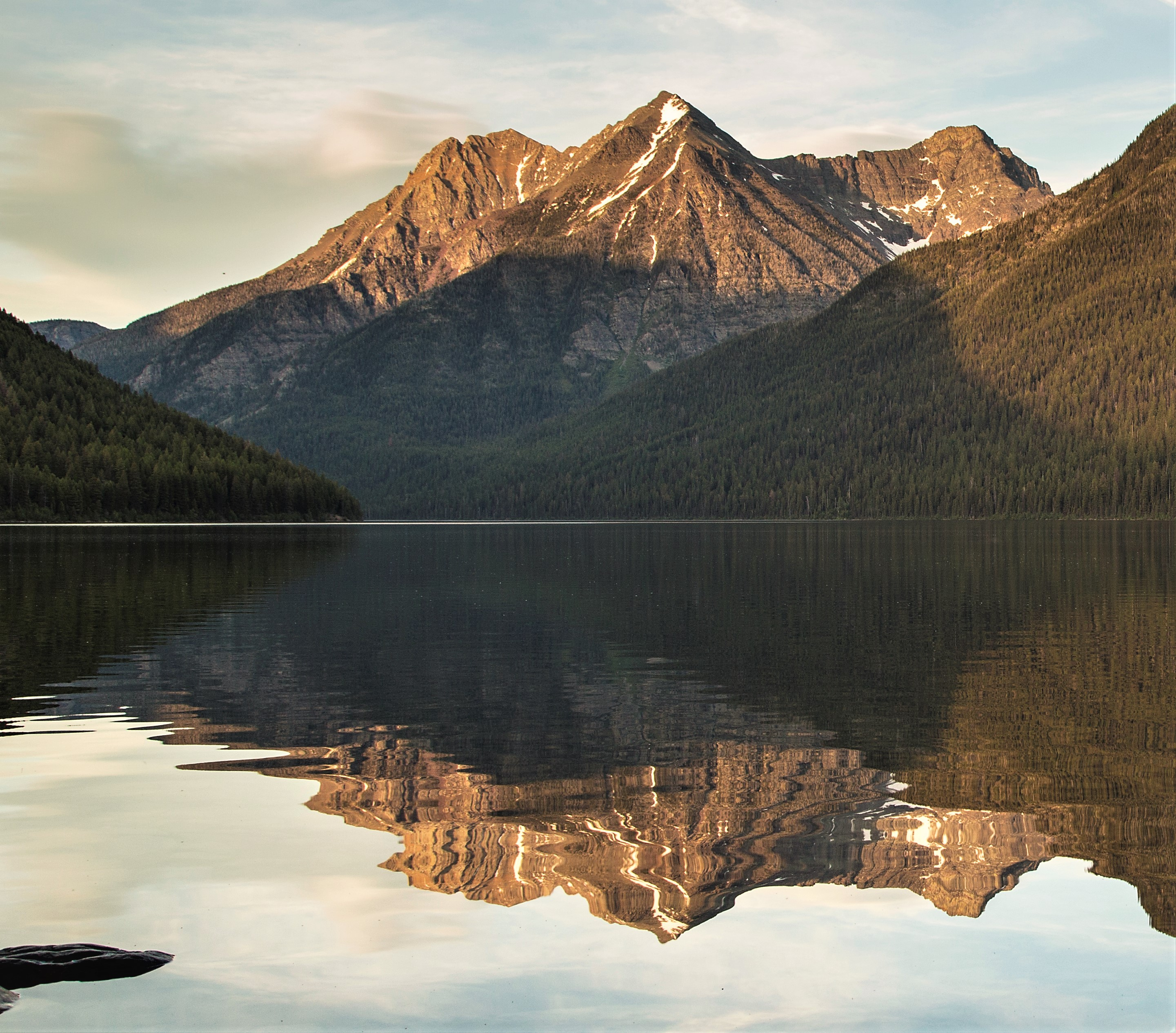
Vulture reflected in Quartz Lake
