= Vulture Glacier (Montana) =

Glacier in Montana, United States

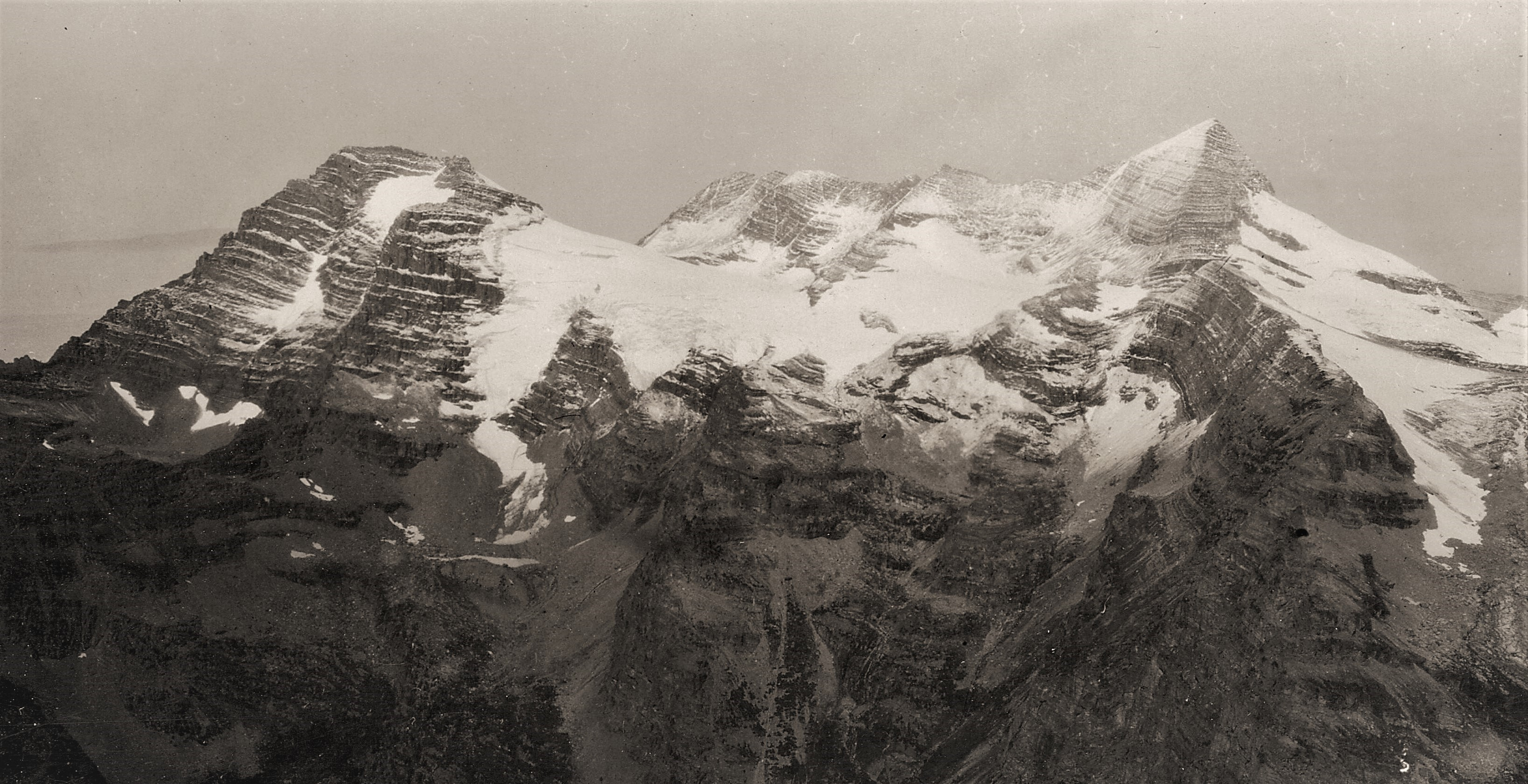
- Vulture Glacier in 1913

- Location within Montana
- Type: Mountain glacier
- Location: Glacier National Park, Flathead County, Montana, United States
- Coordinates: 48°49′36″N 114°01′20″W
- Area: Approximately 77 acres (0.31 km^{2}) in 2005
- Terminus: Talus
- Status: Retreating

Vulture Glacier is in Glacier National Park, U.S. state of Montana. The glacier is situated just south of Vulture Peak at an average elevation of 8,412 feet (2,564 m) above sea level. Between 1966 and 2005, Vulture Glacier lost over 50 percent of its surface area.

== See also ==
- List of glaciers in the United States
- Glaciers in Glacier National Park (U.S.)
