= Boulder Glacier (Montana) =

Glacier in Montana, United States

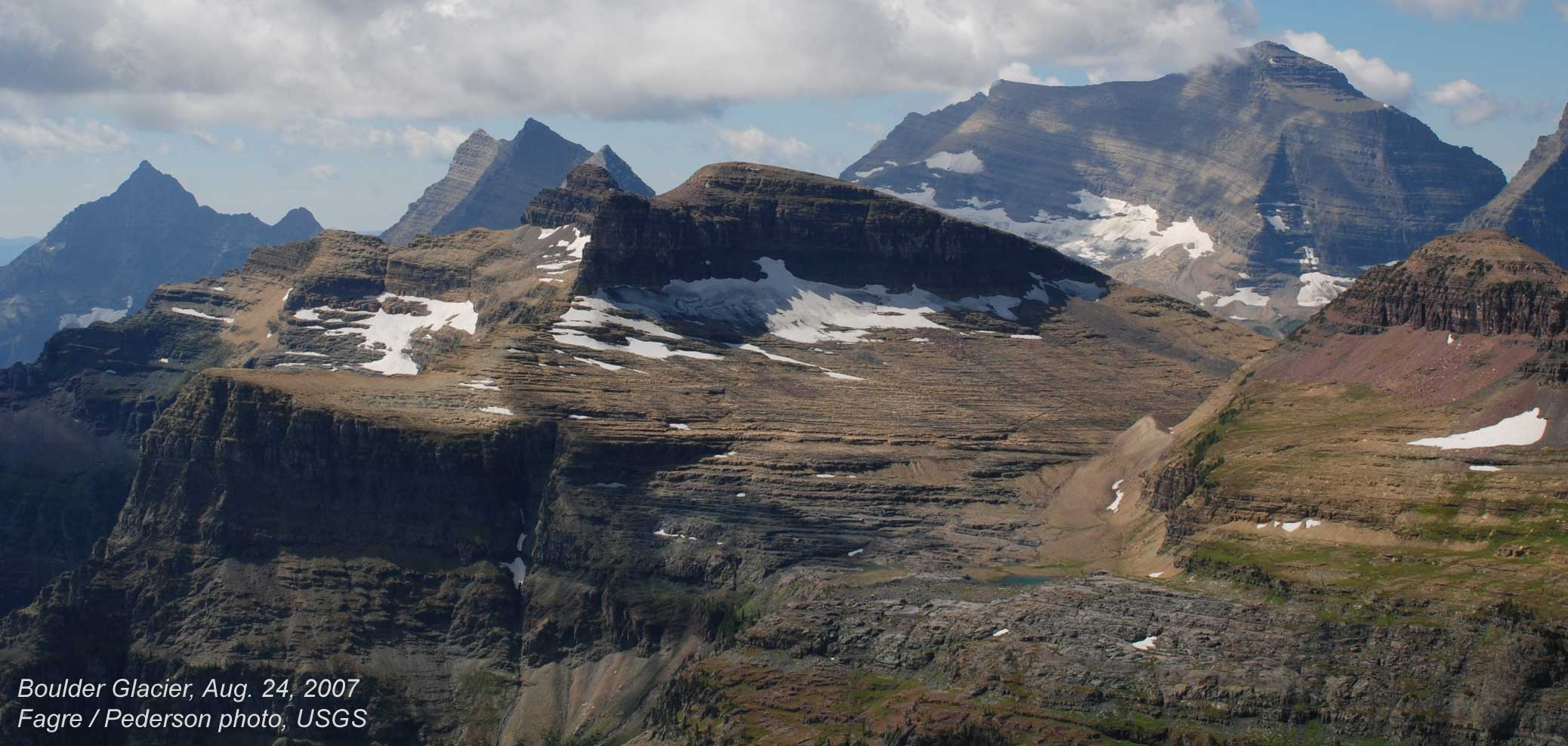
- Boulder Glacier as seen in 2007

- Location within Montana
- Type: cirque glacier
- Location: Glacier National Park, Flathead County, Montana, U.S.
- Coordinates: 48°57′27″N 114°05′16″W
- Area: 13 acres (0.053 km^{2}) in 2005
- Length: .08 mi (0.13 km)
- Terminus: Barren rock
- Status: Retreating

Boulder Glacier is located in the U.S. state of Montana in Glacier National Park (U.S.). The glacier is situated to the north of Boulder Peak and west of the Continental Divide. Between 1966 and 2005, Boulder Glacier lost more than 75 percent of its surface area. As of 2005 the glacier was measured to cover only 13 acres (0.053 km^{2}), and no longer met the 25 acres (0.10 km^{2}) threshold often cited as the minimal area to qualify as an active glacier.

Boulder Glacier was photographed in 2007 by researchers from the U.S. Geological Survey and those images demonstrate that the glacier has almost disappeared. Earlier images taken in 1910 depict a glacier that was far larger than what was recorded in 2007.

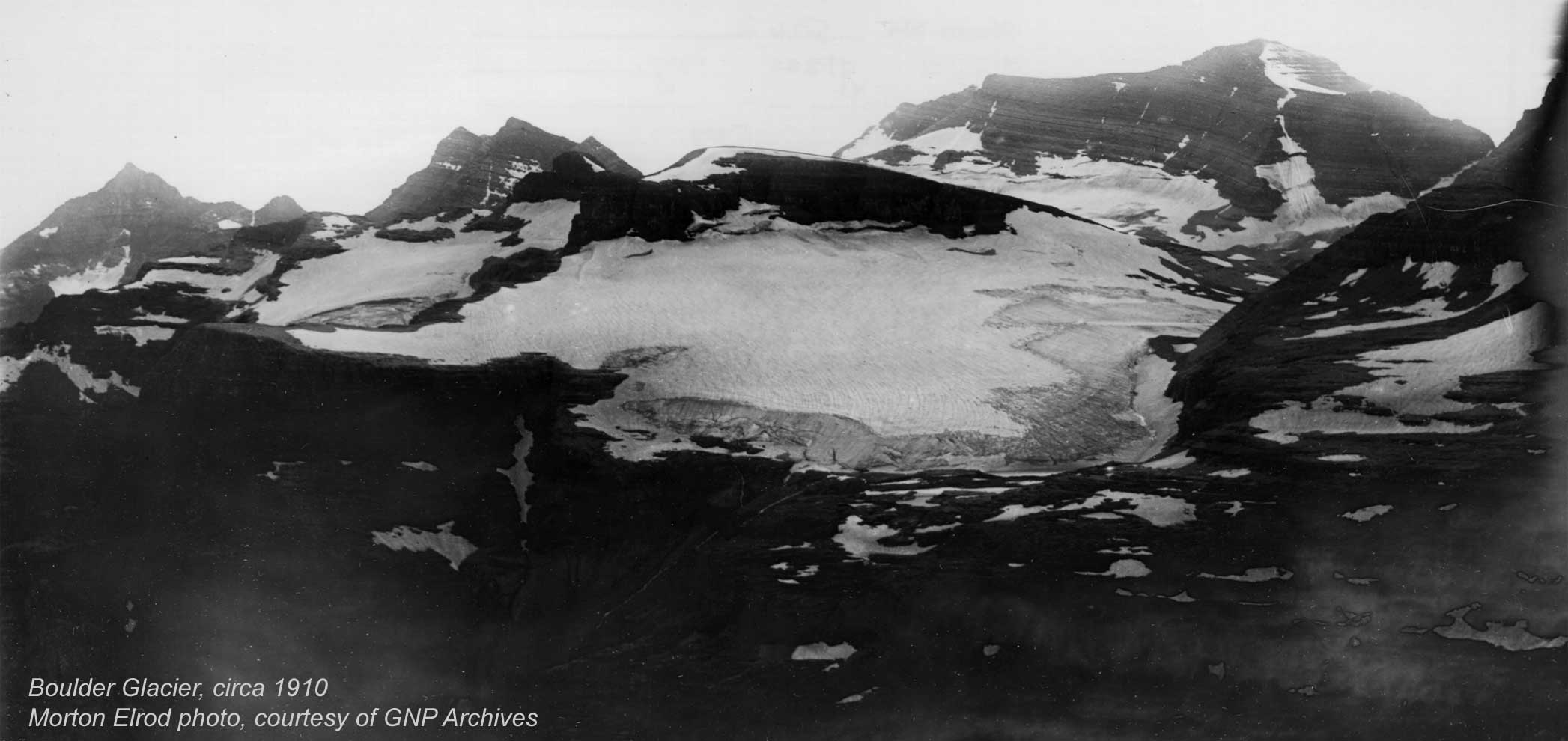
Boulder Glacier was far larger when this image was taken in 1910. Compare to the image in the infobox upper right.

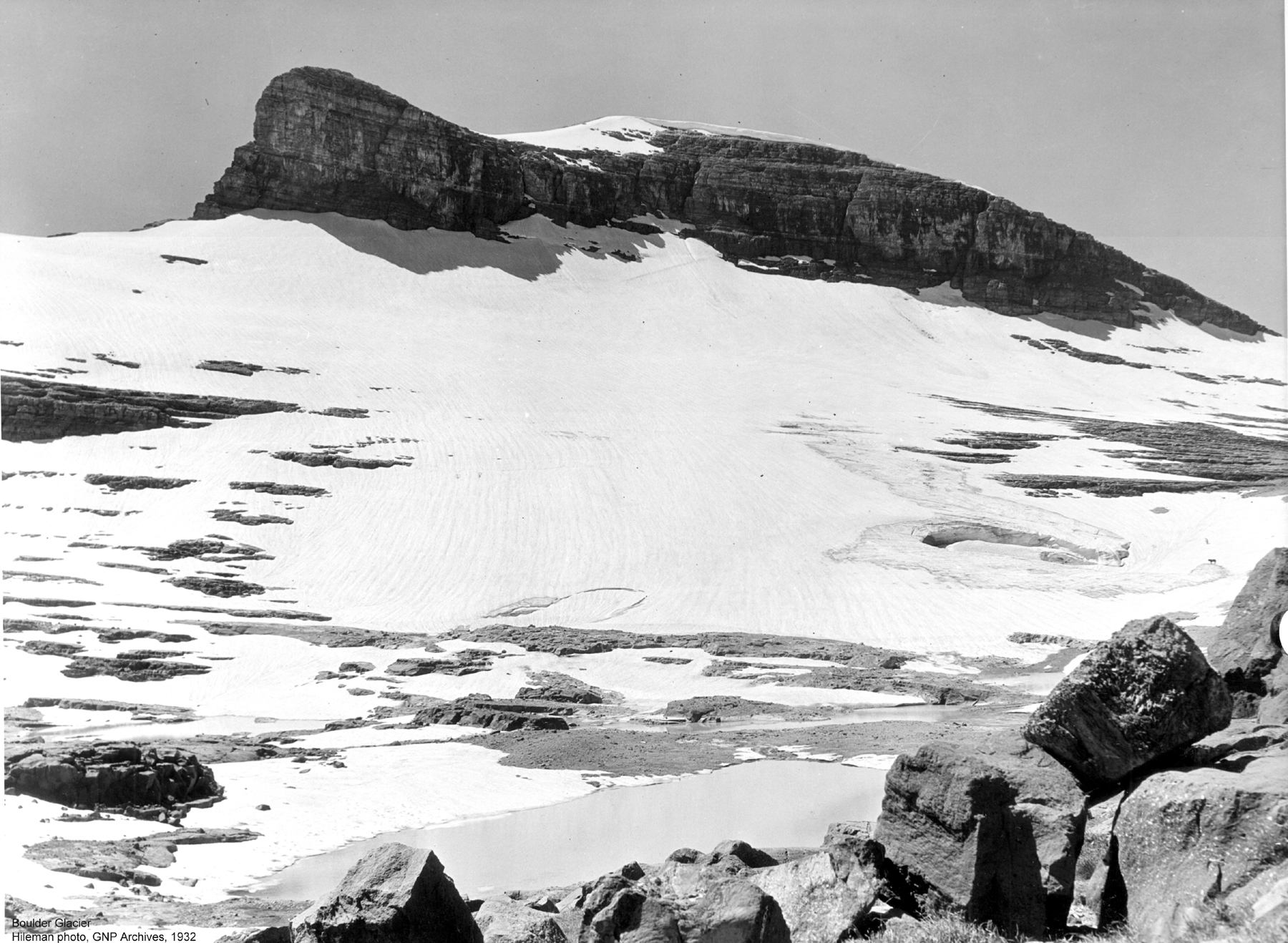
Boulder Glacier from a different angle in 1932

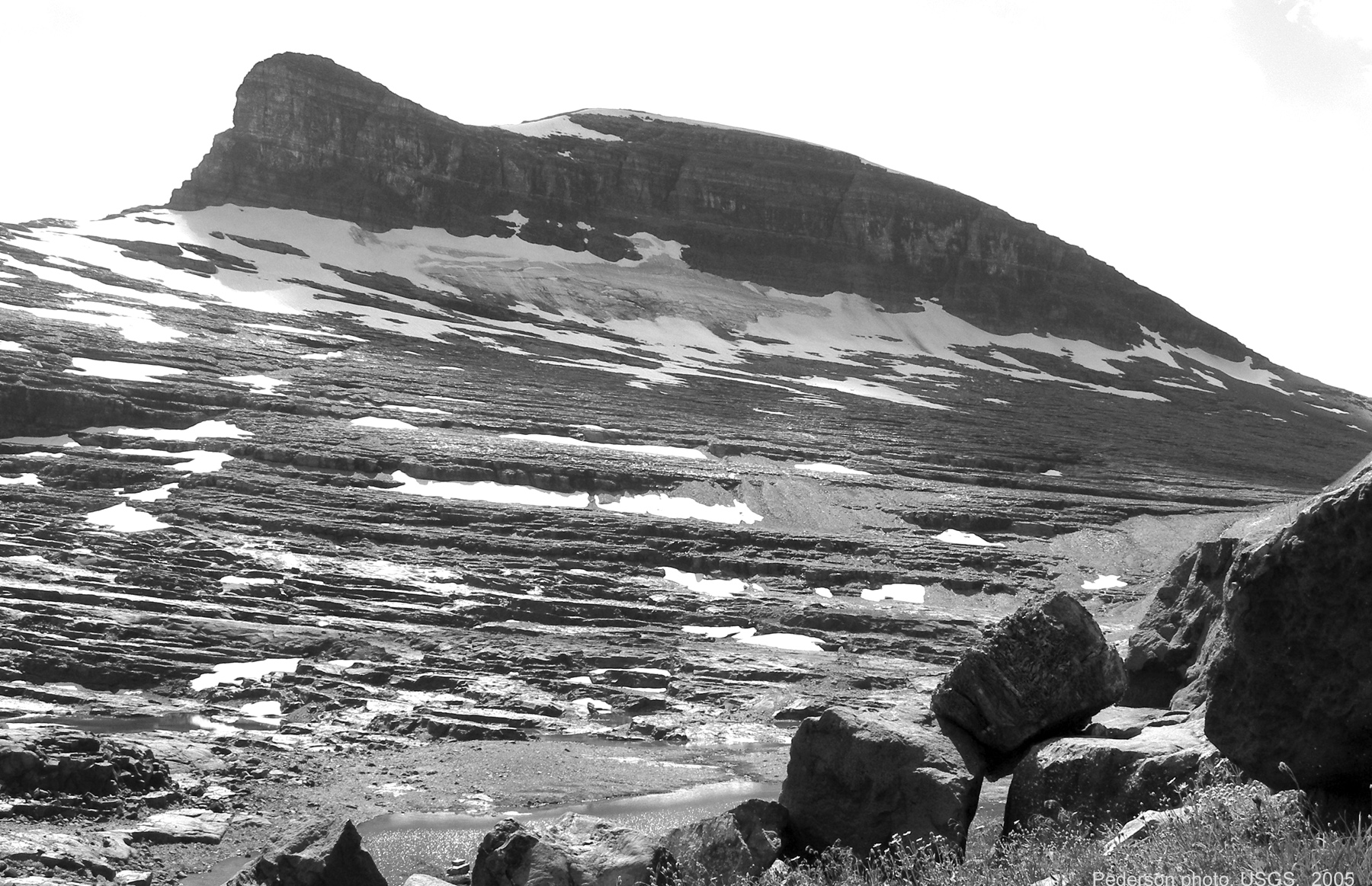
Boulder Glacier in 2005

== See also ==
- List of glaciers in the United States
- Glaciers in Glacier National Park (U.S.)
