= Matahpi Peak =

Mountain in the state of Montana

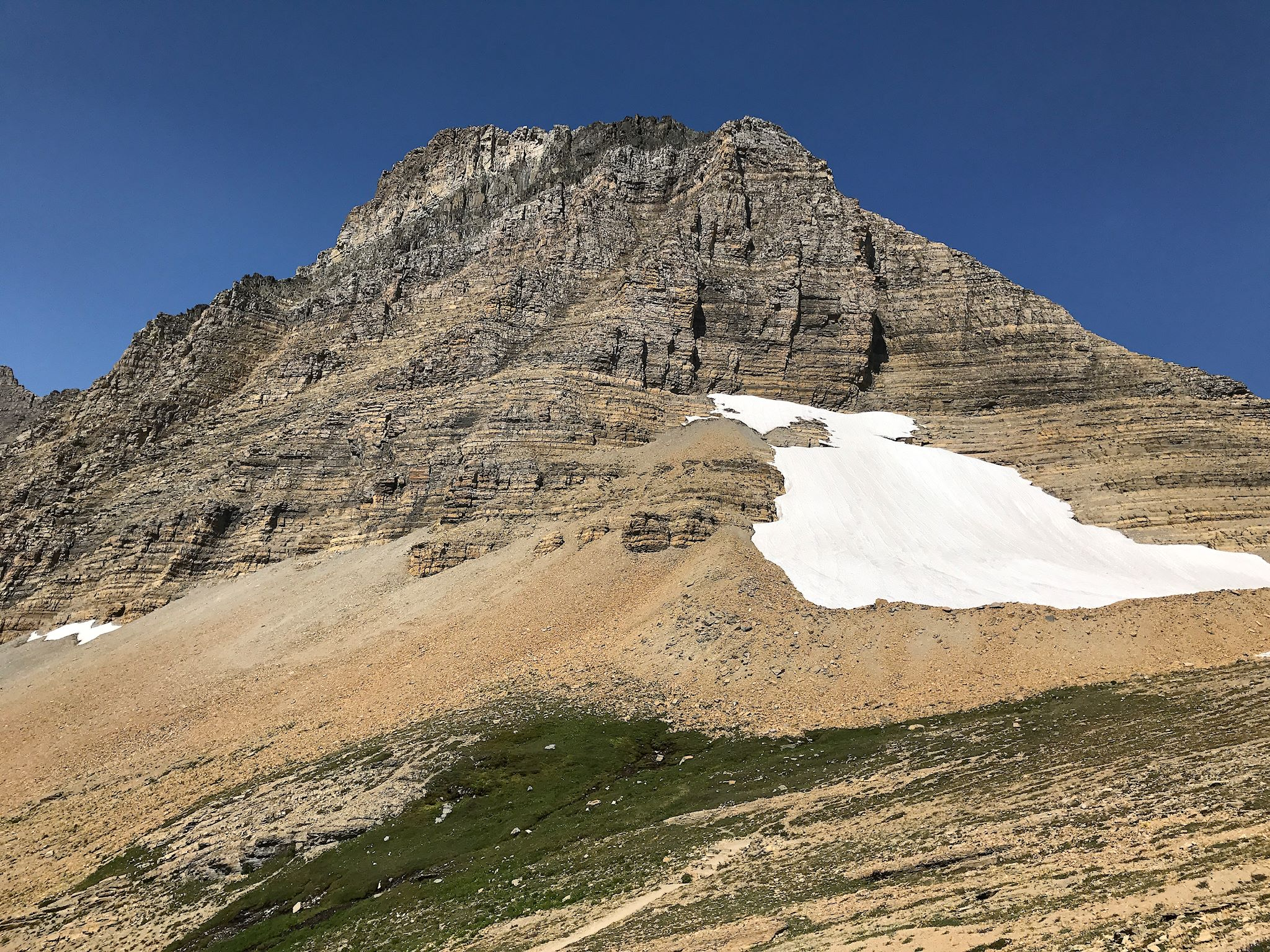
- Matahpi Peak

Highest point
- Elevation: 9,370 ft (2,860 m)
- Prominence: 965 ft (294 m)
- Coordinates: 48°42′24″N 113°38′21″W

Geography
- Location within Montana Location within the United States
- Location: Glacier County, Montana, U.S.
- Parent range: Lewis Range
- Topo map(s): USGS Logan Pass, MT

Matahpi Peak (9,370 feet (2,856 m)) is located in the Lewis Range, Glacier National Park in the U.S. state of Montana. Below the summit of Matahpi Peak lies Sexton Glacier. Going-to-the-Sun Mountain is just over 1 mile (1.6 km) to the south of Matahpi Peak.

== Geology ==
Like other mountains in Glacier National Park, Matahpi Peak is composed of sedimentary rock laid down during the Precambrian to Jurassic periods. Formed in shallow seas, this sedimentary rock was initially uplifted beginning 170 million years ago when the Lewis Overthrust fault pushed an enormous slab of precambrian rocks 3 mi (4.8 km) thick, 50 miles (80 km) wide and 160 miles (260 km) long over younger rock of the cretaceous period.

== See also ==
- Mountains and mountain ranges of Glacier National Park (U.S.)

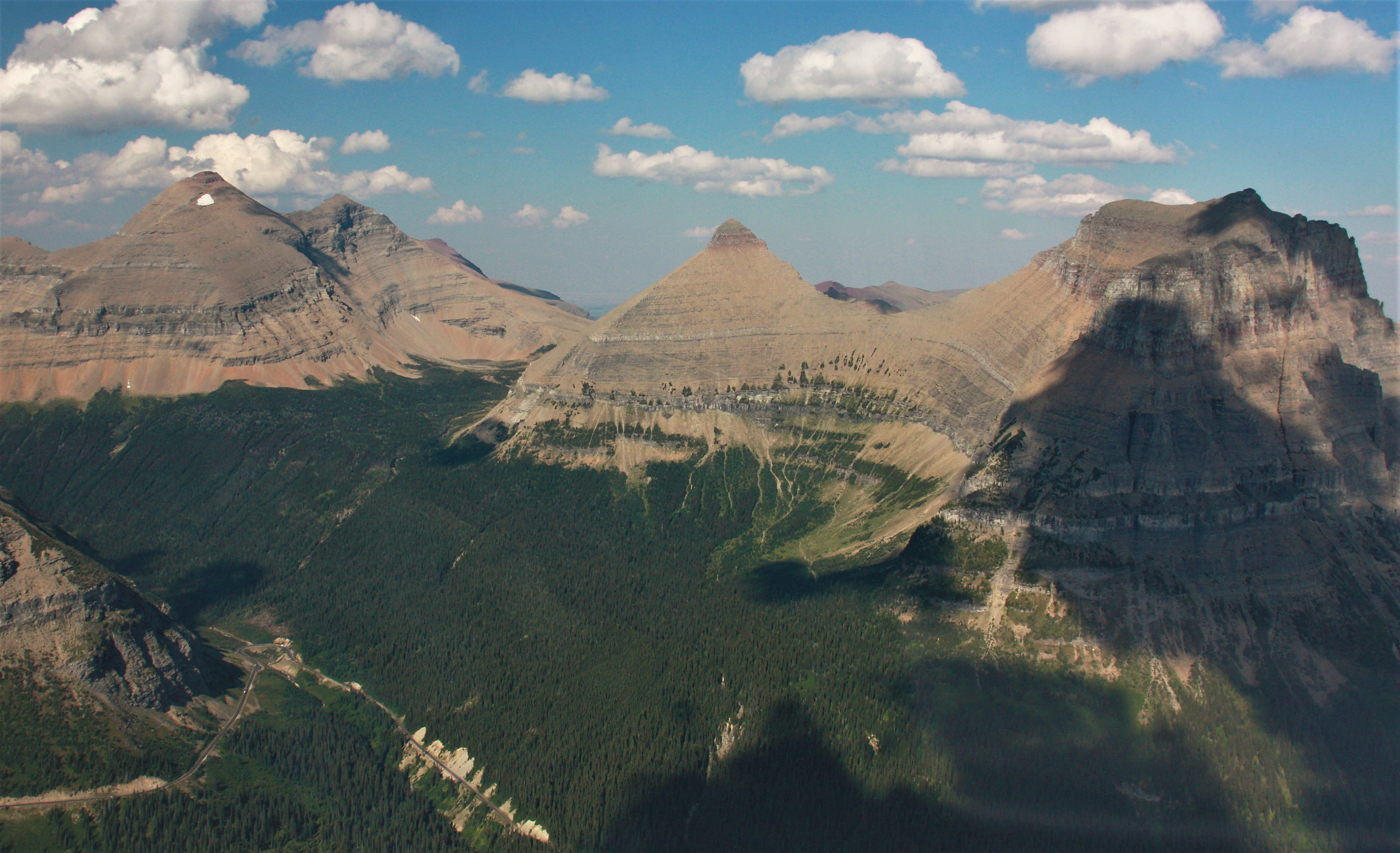
Aerial view of Mt. Siyeh, (left), Matahpi Peak (center), Going-to-the-Sun Mountain (right).
