= Baby Glacier (Montana) =

Glacier in Montana, United States

- Location within Montana
- Type: Mountain glacier
- Location: Glacier National Park, Flathead County, Montana, United States
- Coordinates: 48°54′20″N 114°09′15″W
- Area: Approximately 19 acres (0.077 km^{2}) in 2005
- Length: .25 mi (0.40 km)
- Status: Retreating

Baby Glacier is a glacier located in the U.S. state of Montana in Glacier National Park. Baby Glacier is situated in a cirque on the northeast slope of Numa Peak, at an elevation between 7,200 feet (2,200 m) and 6,800 feet (2,100 m) above sea level. The glacier covers approximately 19 acres (0.077 km^{2}) and does not meet the threshold of 25 acres (0.10 km^{2}) often cited as being the minimum size to qualify as an active glacier. Between 1966 and 2005, Baby Glacier lost a third of its surface area.

== See also ==
- List of glaciers in the United States
- Glaciers in Glacier National Park (U.S.)
