= Piegan Glacier =

Glacier in Montana, United States

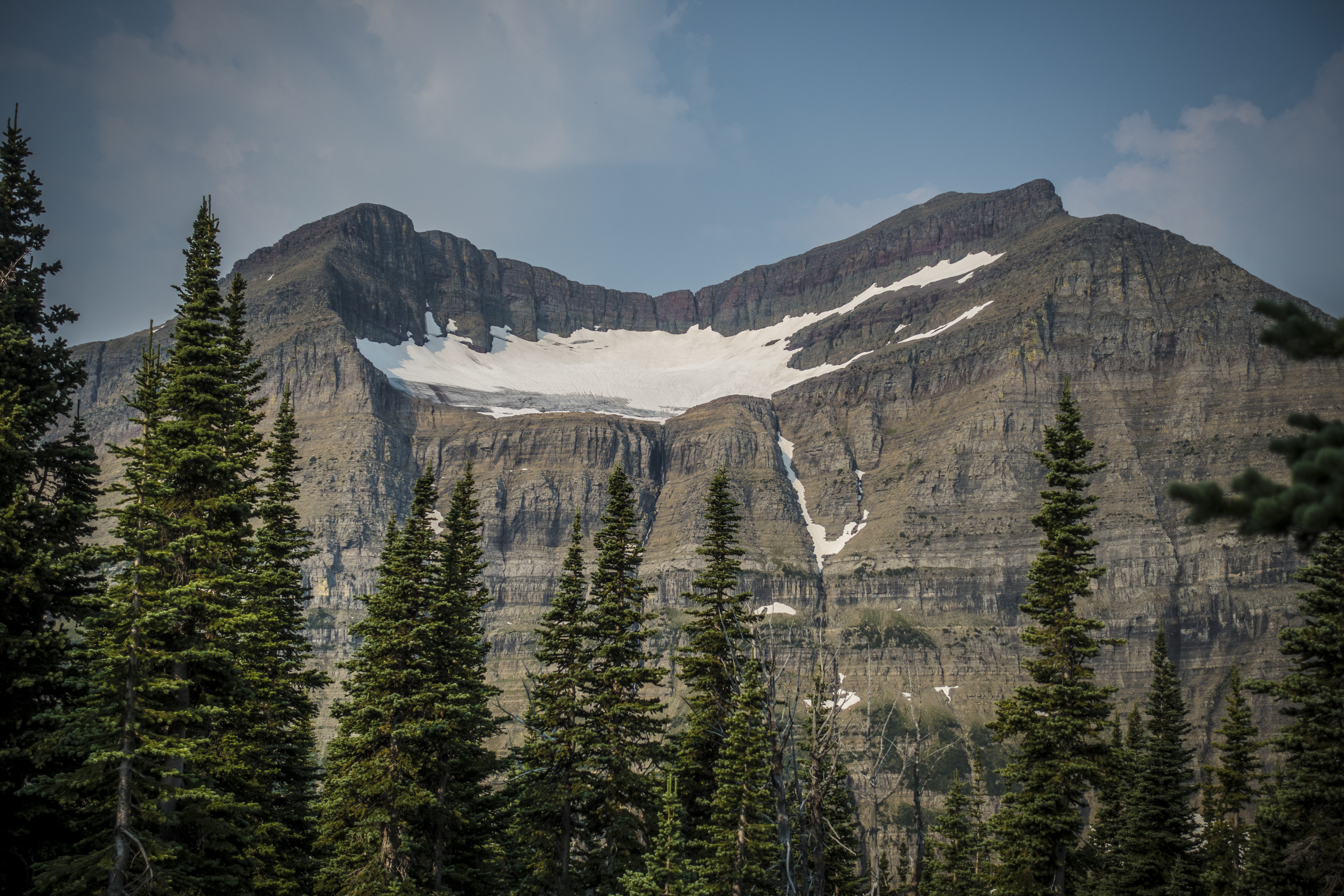
- Piegan Glacier on Piegan Mountain

- Location within Montana
- Type: Mountain glacier
- Location: Glacier National Park, Glacier County, Montana, U.S.
- Coordinates: 48°42′29″N 113°41′02″W
- Area: Approximately 62 acres (0.25 km^{2}) in 2005
- Terminus: Barren rock
- Status: Retreating

Piegan Glacier is in Glacier National Park in the U.S. state of Montana. The glacier is situated in a cirque on the southeast slope of Piegan Mountain and just below the summit at an elevation between 8,800 and 8,200 ft (2,700 and 2,500 m) above sea level. The glacier covered an area of approximately 62 acres (0.25 km^{2}) in 2005, a 10 percent reduction in its surface area since 1966. Comparing images of the glacier taken in 1930 with those from 1998, indicates that the glacier experienced relatively little change during that period.

== See also ==
- List of glaciers in the United States
- Glaciers in Glacier National Park (U.S.)
