= Lake Nooney =

Lake in the American state of Montana

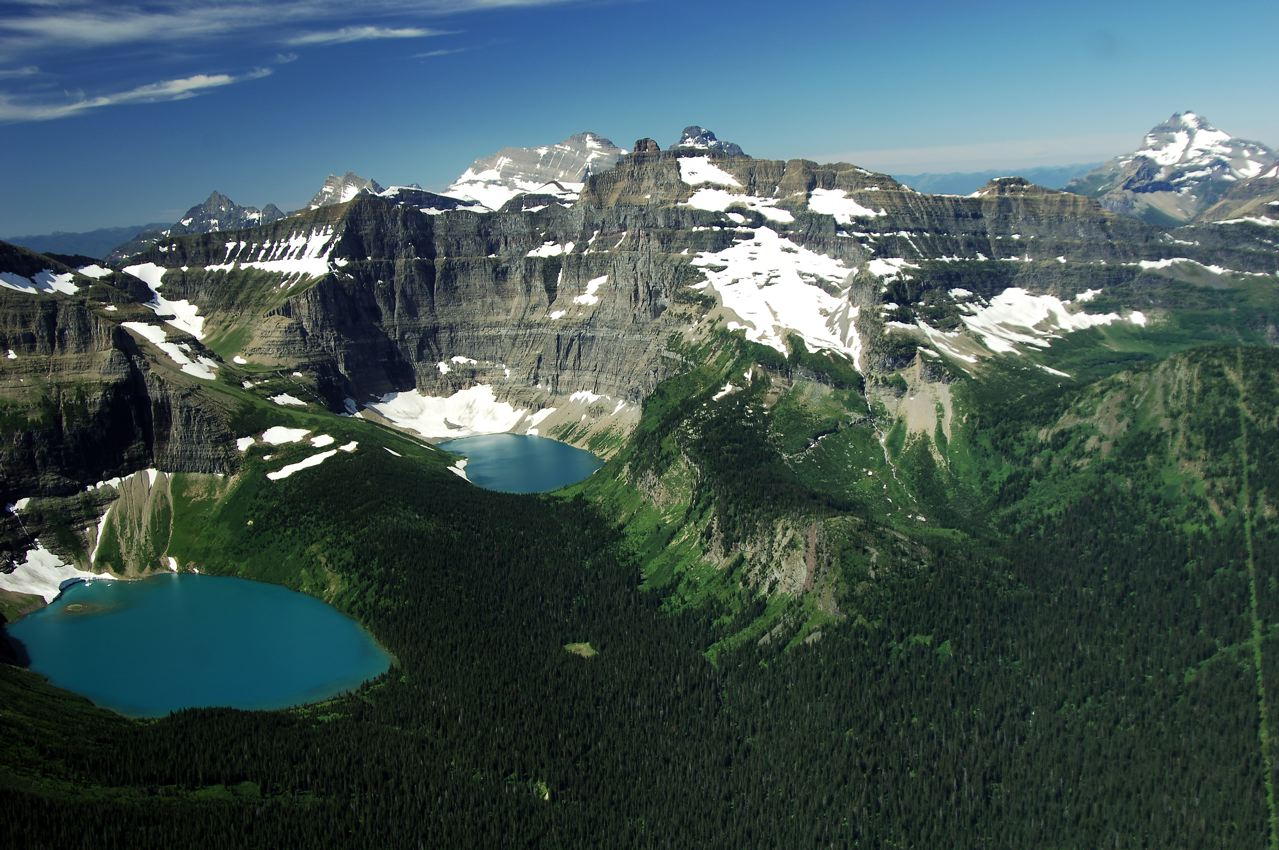
- Lake Wurdeman (lower left) and Lake Nooney (center)

- Location within Montana Location within the United States
- Location: Glacier National Park, Glacier County, Montana, US
- Coordinates: 48°58′47″N 114°02′38″W
- Type: Natural
- Primary outflows: Boundary Creek
- Basin countries: United States
- Max. length: .60 miles (0.97 km)
- Max. width: .25 miles (0.40 km)
- Surface elevation: 5,500 ft (1,700 m)

Lake Nooney is located in Glacier National Park, in the U. S. state of Montana. The lake is east of Mount Custer and .50 miles (0.80 km) west of Lake Wurdeman. The Herbst Glacier is located above the lake to the northwest. Rock flour (silt) from melting glaciers make the lake appear opaque turquoise in color.

== See also ==
- List of lakes in Glacier County, Montana
