= Thunderbird Glacier =

Glacier in Montana, United States

- Location within Montana
- Type: Mountain glacier
- Location: Glacier National Park, Glacier County, Montana, U.S.
- Coordinates: 48°56′03″N 114°02′23″W
- Area: Approximately 58 acres (0.23 km^{2}) in total including numerous ice patches
- Terminus: Talus
- Status: Retreating

Thunderbird Glacier is in Glacier National Park in the U.S. state of Montana. The glacier is situated on the east side Continental Divide below Thunderbird Mountain at an average elevation of 8,000 feet (2,400 m) above sea level. As of 2005, Thunderbird Glacier consisted of numerous ice patches covering a total of 58 acres (0.23 km^{2}), which is over 33 percent smaller than it was in 1966.

== See also ==
- List of glaciers in the United States
- Glaciers in Glacier National Park (U.S.)
