= Lake Wurdeman =

Lake in the American state of Montana

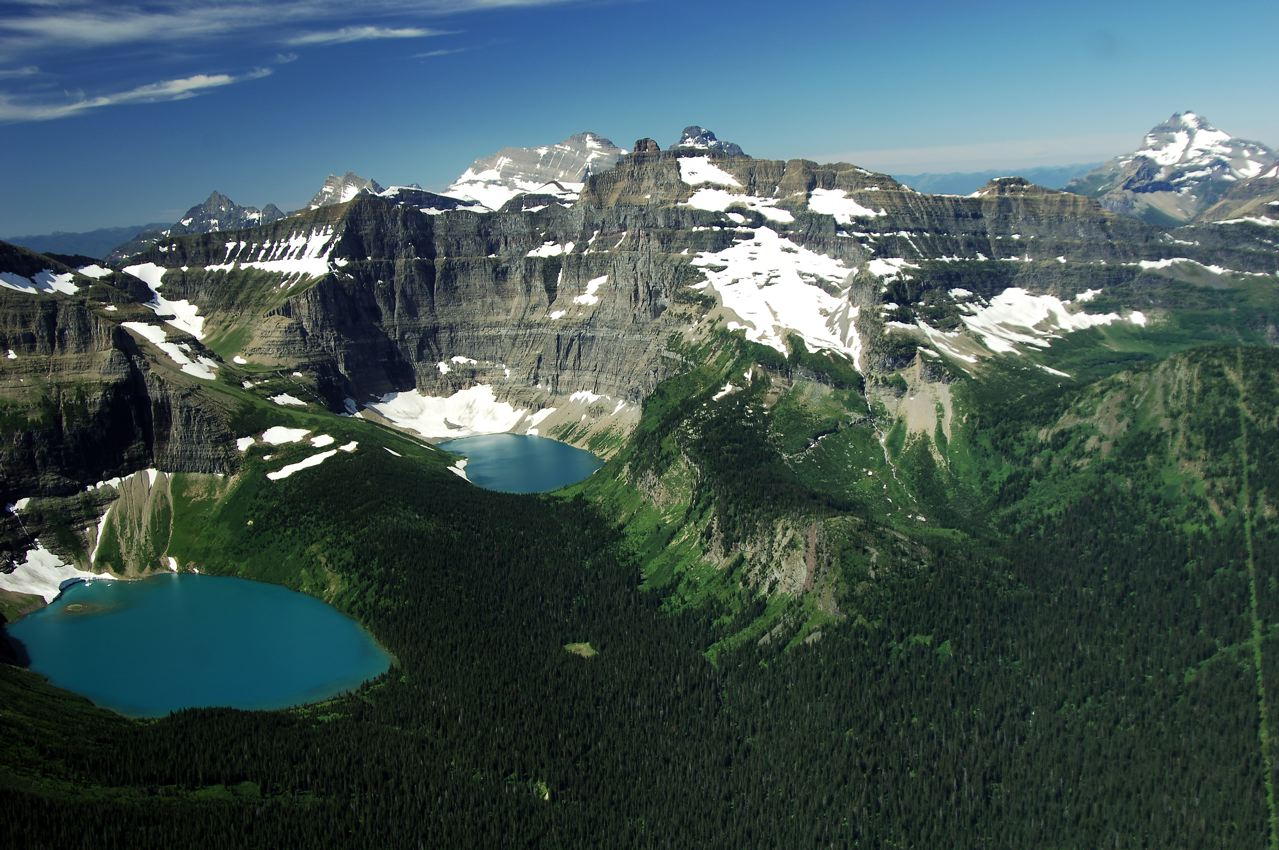
- Lake Wurdeman (lower left) and Lake Nooney (center)

- Location within Montana Location within the United States
- Location: Glacier National Park, Glacier County, Montana, US
- Coordinates: 48°58′43″N 114°01′19″W
- Type: Natural
- Primary outflows: Boundary Creek
- Basin countries: United States
- Max. length: .80 miles (1.29 km)
- Max. width: .45 miles (0.72 km)
- Surface elevation: 5,265 ft (1,605 m)

Lake Wurdeman is located in Glacier National Park, in the U. S. state of Montana. The lake is northwest of Chapman Peak and .50 miles (0.80 km) east of Lake Nooney.

== See also ==
- List of lakes in Glacier County, Montana
