= Mount Doody =

Mountain in Montana, United States

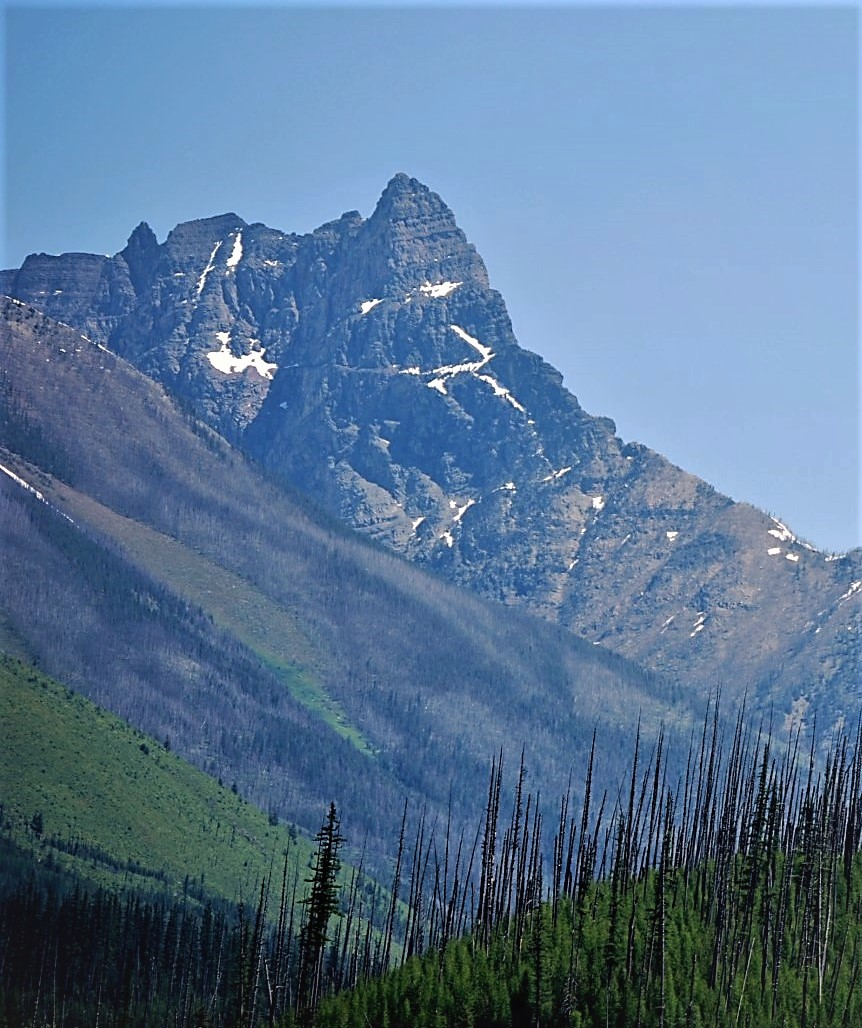
- Mt. Doody from the west

Highest point
- Elevation: 8,644–8,684 ft (2,635–2,647 m) NAVD 88
- Prominence: 160 ft (49 m)
- Coordinates: 48°25′48″N 113°34′33″W

Naming
- Etymology: Dan Doody, park ranger

Geography
- Location within Montana Location within the United States
- Location: Flathead County, Montana, U.S.
- Parent range: Lewis Range
- Topo map(s): USGS Mount Saint Nicholas, MT

Climbing
- First ascent: Unknown

Mount Doody (8,644–8,684 feet (2,635–2,647 m)) is located in the Lewis Range, Glacier National Park in the U.S. state of Montana. Mount Doody is astride the same ridgeline as the Cloudcroft Peaks which are to the immediate northeast. Dan Doody was one of the first six rangers at Glacier National Park. Doody patrolled the Middle Fork drainages, using his own homestead as a headquarters. Later, because of his recognized hunting abilities, Doody became a park hunter skilled at removing "undesirable" wildlife from the area.

== Geology ==
Like other mountains in Glacier National Park, the peak is composed of sedimentary rock laid down during the Precambrian to Jurassic periods. Formed in shallow seas, this sedimentary rock was initially uplifted beginning 170 million years ago when the Lewis Overthrust fault pushed an enormous slab of precambrian rocks 3 mi (4.8 km) thick, 50 miles (80 km) wide and 160 miles (260 km) long over younger rock of the cretaceous period.

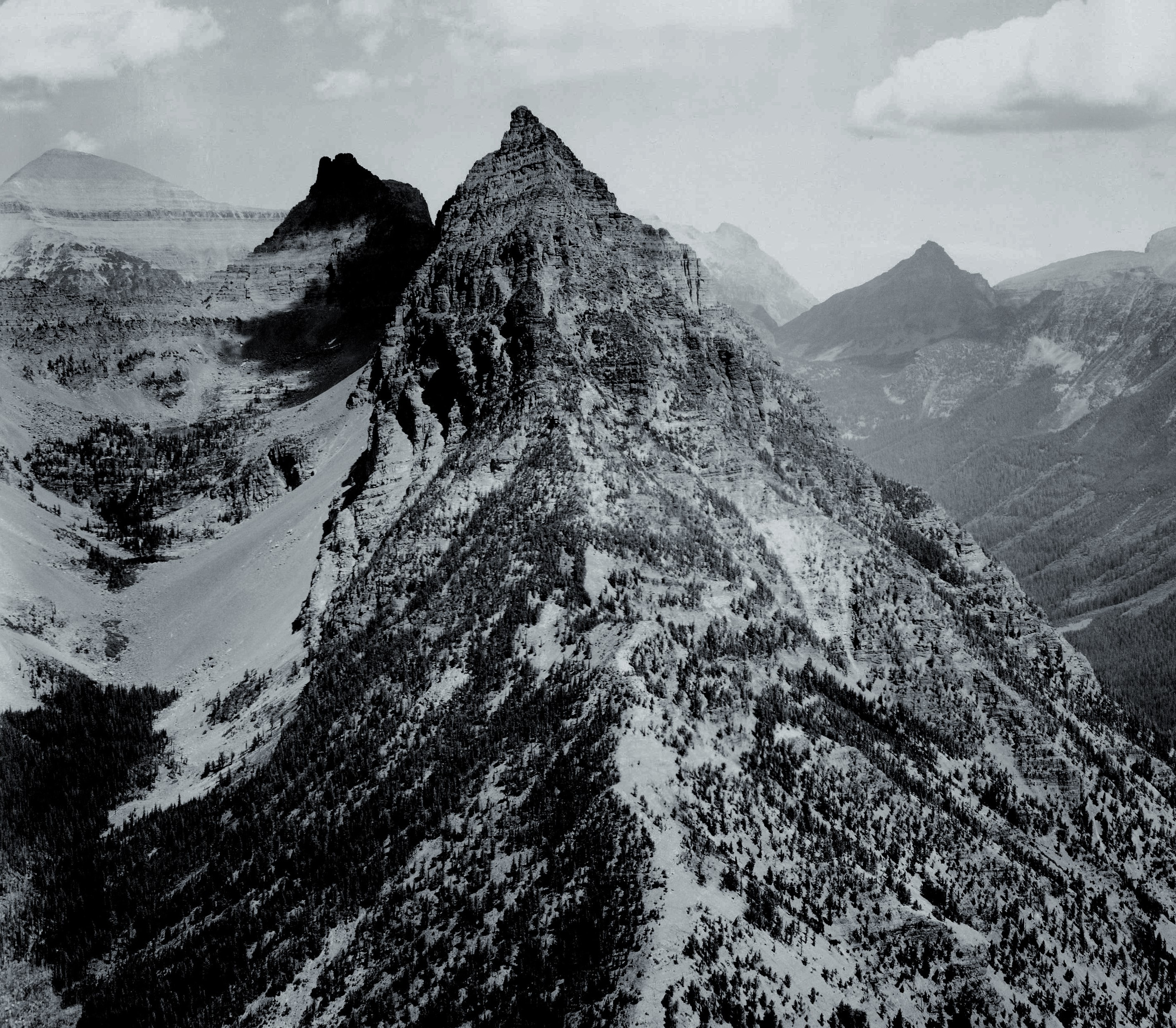
Aerial view, southwest aspect

== Climate ==
Based on the Köppen climate classification, the peak is located in an alpine subarctic climate zone with long, cold, snowy winters, and cool to warm summers. Temperatures can drop below −10 °F with wind chill factors below −30 °F.

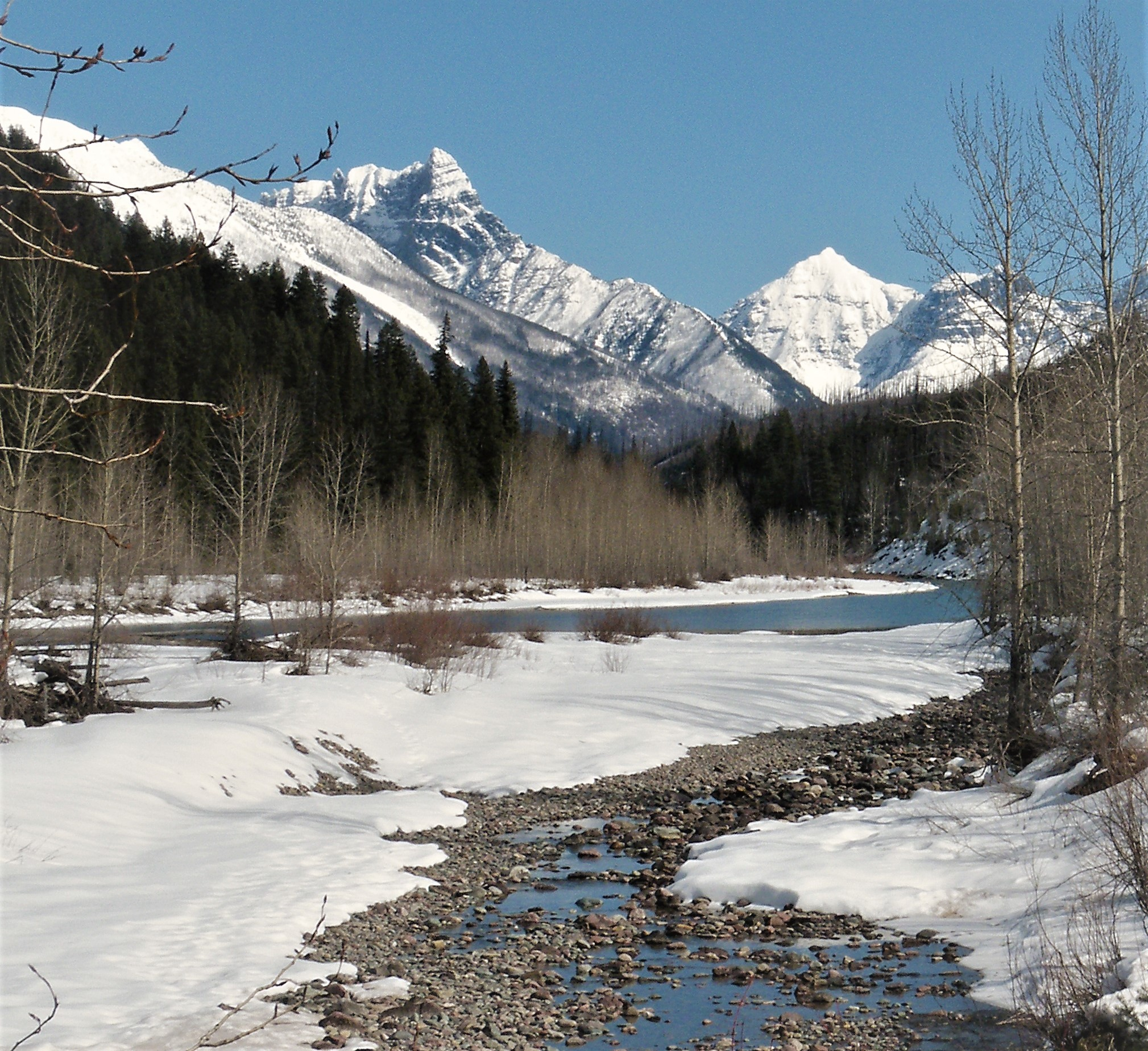
Mt. Doody (left of center), Battlement Mountain (right) from Middle Fork Flathead River

== See also ==
- Mountains and mountain ranges of Glacier National Park (U.S.)
