= Eagle Ribs Mountain =

Mountain in the state of Montana

- Location within Montana Location within the United States

Highest point
- Elevation: 8,295 ft (2,528 m) NAVD 88
- Prominence: 210 ft (64 m)
- Coordinates: 48°24′22″N 113°25′02″W

Geography
- Location: Flathead County, Montana, U.S.
- Parent range: Lewis Range
- Topo map(s): USGS Mount Rockwell, MT

Climbing
- First ascent: Unknown

Eagle Ribs Mountain (8,295 feet (2,528 m)) is located in the Lewis Range, Glacier National Park in the U.S. state of Montana. Eagle Ribs Mountain has an adjacent peak that is unnamed and is slightly taller at 8,406 ft (2,562 m) to the southeast while to the southwest lies Mount Despair.

== See also ==
- Mountains and mountain ranges of Glacier National Park (U.S.)
