= Square Peak =

Mountain in Montana, United States

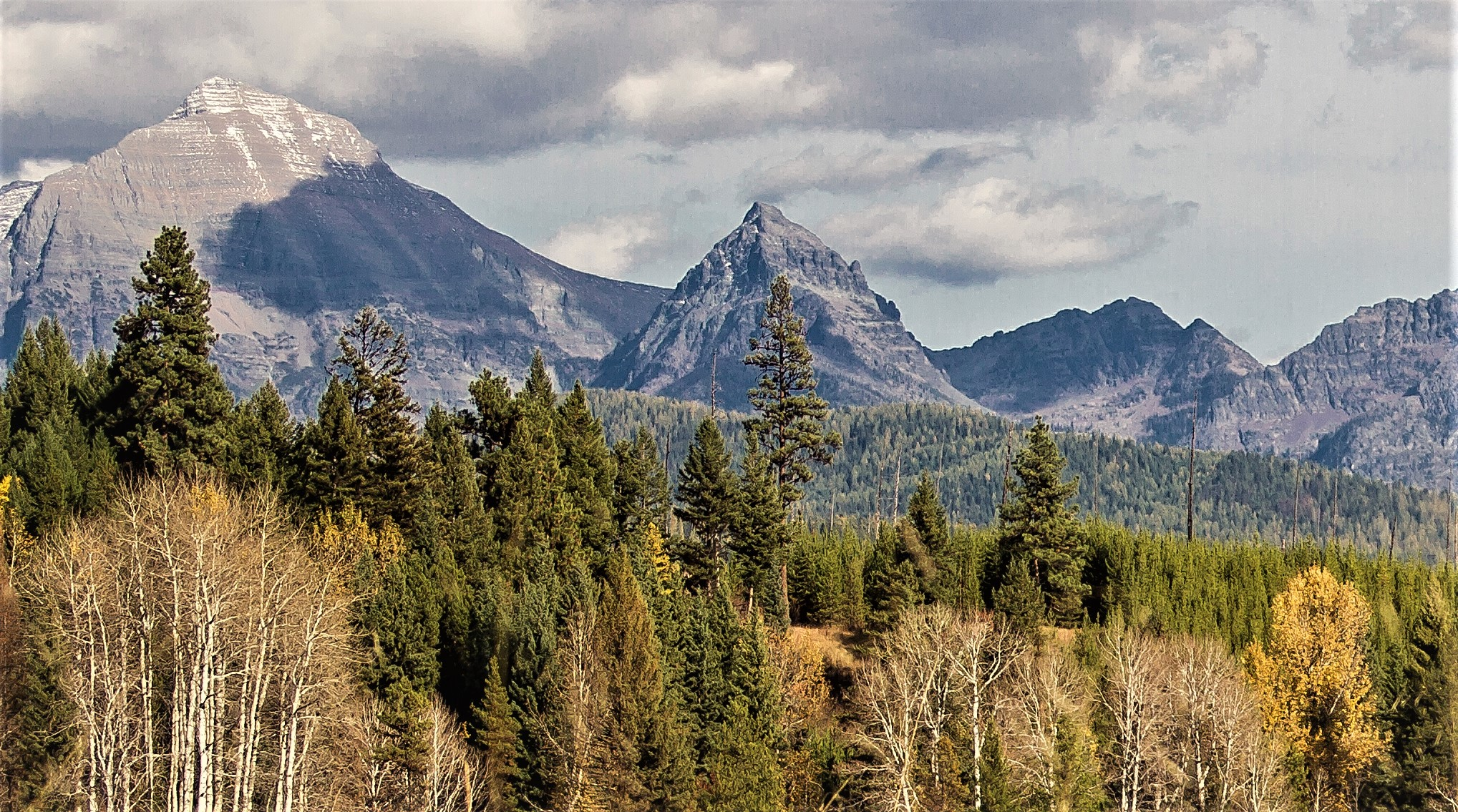
- Square Peak (centered) and Rainbow Peak (left) seen from the west at Big Prairie

Highest point
- Elevation: 8,781 ft (2,676 m)
- Prominence: 1,017 ft (310 m)
- Coordinates: 48°52′00″N 114°06′16″W

Geography
- Location within Montana Location within the United States
- Location: Flathead County, Montana, U.S.
- Parent range: Livingston Range
- Topo map(s): USGS Vulture Peak, MT

Square Peak (8,781 feet (2,676 m)) is located in the Livingston Range, Glacier National Park in the U.S. state of Montana. Square Peak is .63 miles (1.01 km) SSW of Rainbow Peak.

== See also ==
- List of mountains and mountain ranges of Glacier National Park (U.S.)
