= Seward Mountain (Montana) =

Mountain in United States of America

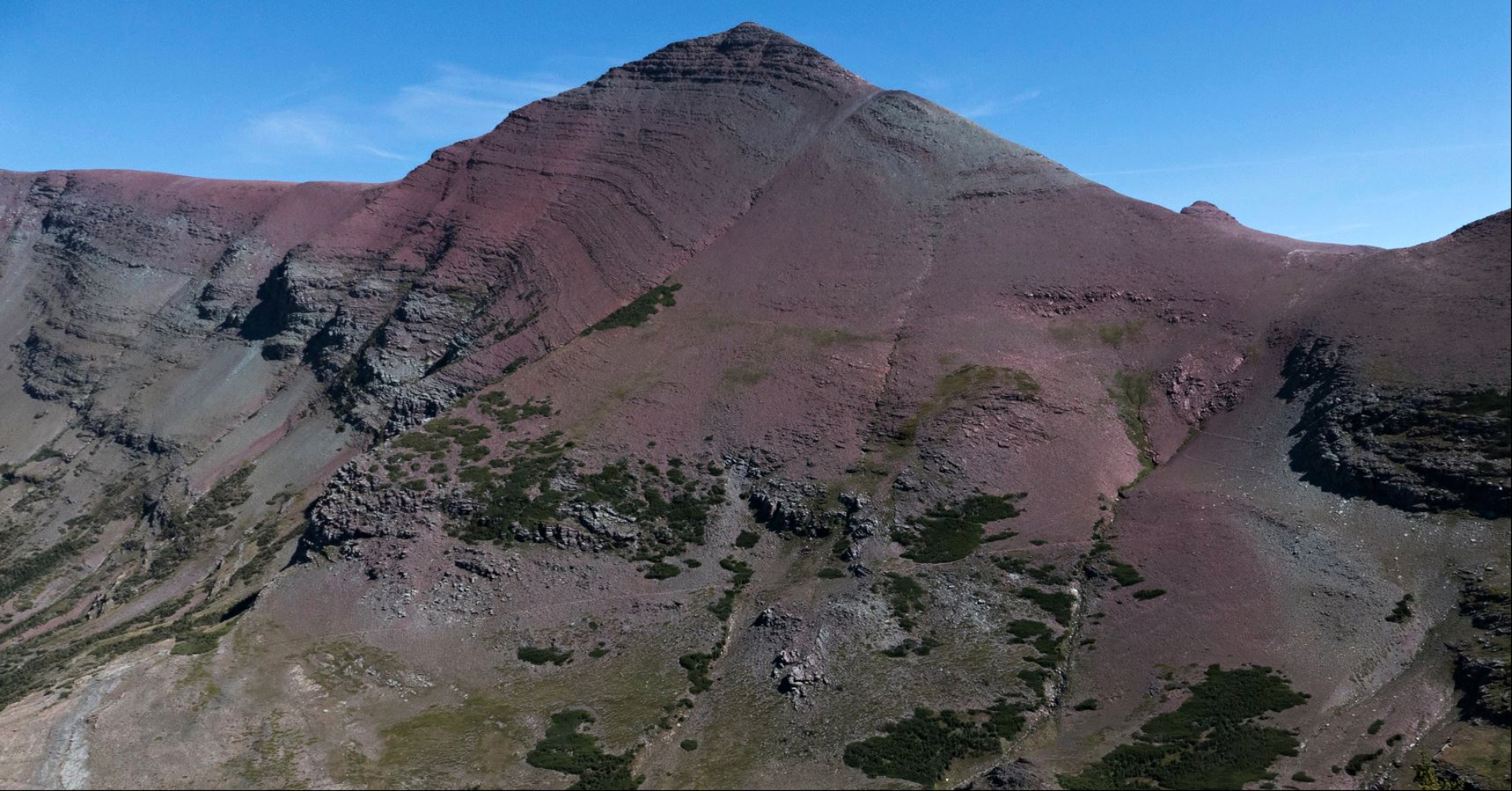

Highest point
- Elevation: 8,917 ft (2,718 m)
- Prominence: 757 ft (231 m)
- Coordinates: 48°52′15″N 113°40′50″W

Geography
- Location within Montana Location within the United States
- Location: Glacier County, Montana, U.S.
- Parent range: Lewis Range
- Topo map(s): USGS Many Glacier, MT

Seward Mountain (8,917 feet (2,718 m)) is located in the Lewis Range, Glacier National Park in the U.S. state of Montana.

== See also ==
- Mountains and mountain ranges of Glacier National Park (U.S.)
