= Wolftail Mountain =

Mountain in Montana, United States

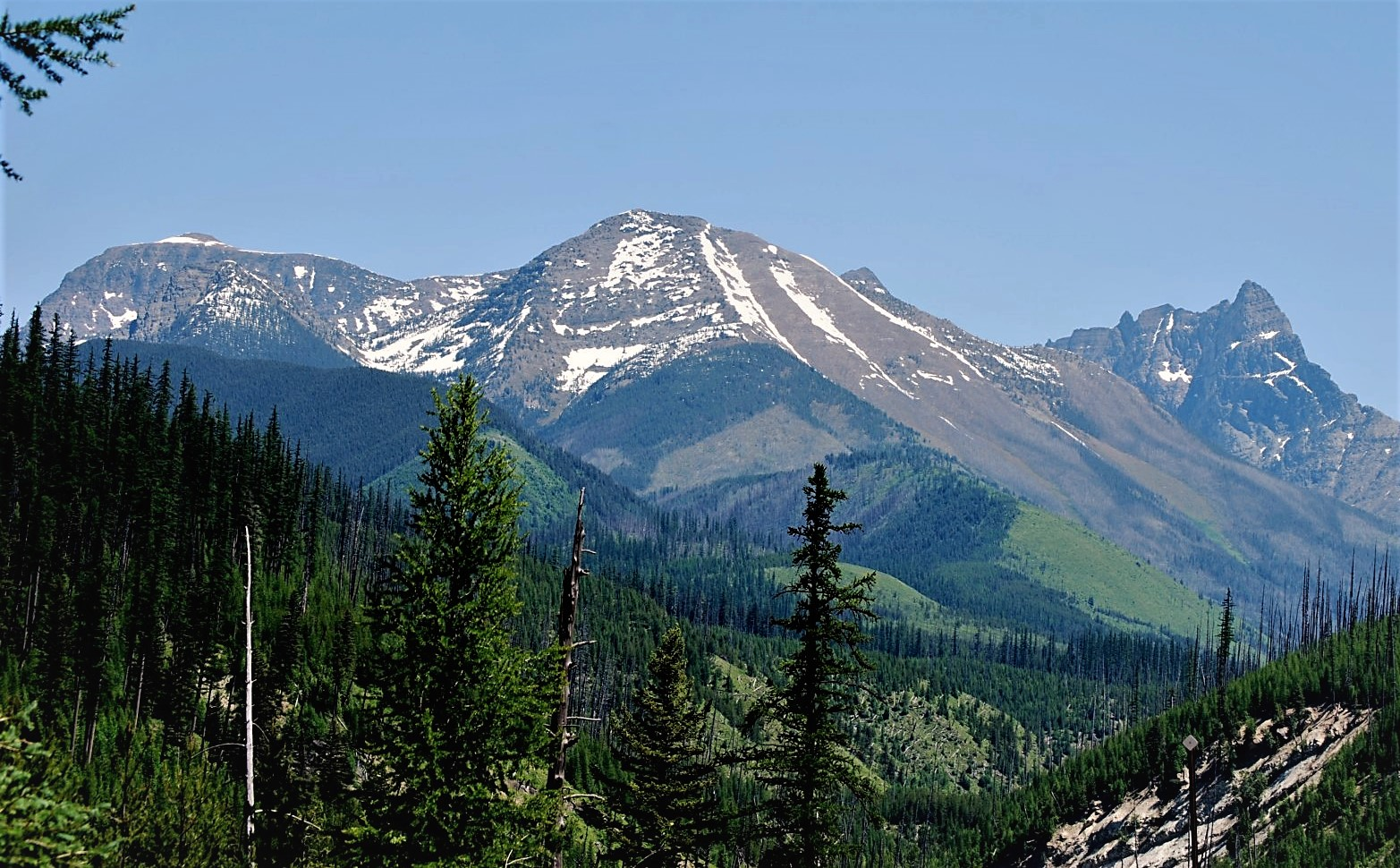
- Wolftail Mountain centered, west aspect. (Peril Peak left, Mt. Doody right)

Highest point
- Elevation: 8,192 ft (2,497 m)
- Prominence: 272 ft (83 m)
- Coordinates: 48°26′26″N 113°36′38″W

Geography
- Location within Montana Location within the United States
- Location: Flathead County, Montana, U.S.
- Parent range: Lewis Range
- Topo map(s): USGS Mount Saint Nicholas, MT

Climbing
- Easiest route: Scramble

Wolftail Mountain (8,176 feet (2,492 m)) is located in the Lewis Range, Glacier National Park in the U.S. state of Montana.

== Climate ==
According to the Köppen climate classification system, Wolftail Mountain is located in an alpine subarctic climate zone with long, cold, snowy winters, and cool to warm summers. Winter temperatures can drop below −10 °F with wind chill factors below −30 °F. Due to its altitude, it receives precipitation all year, as snow in winter, and as thunderstorms in summer.

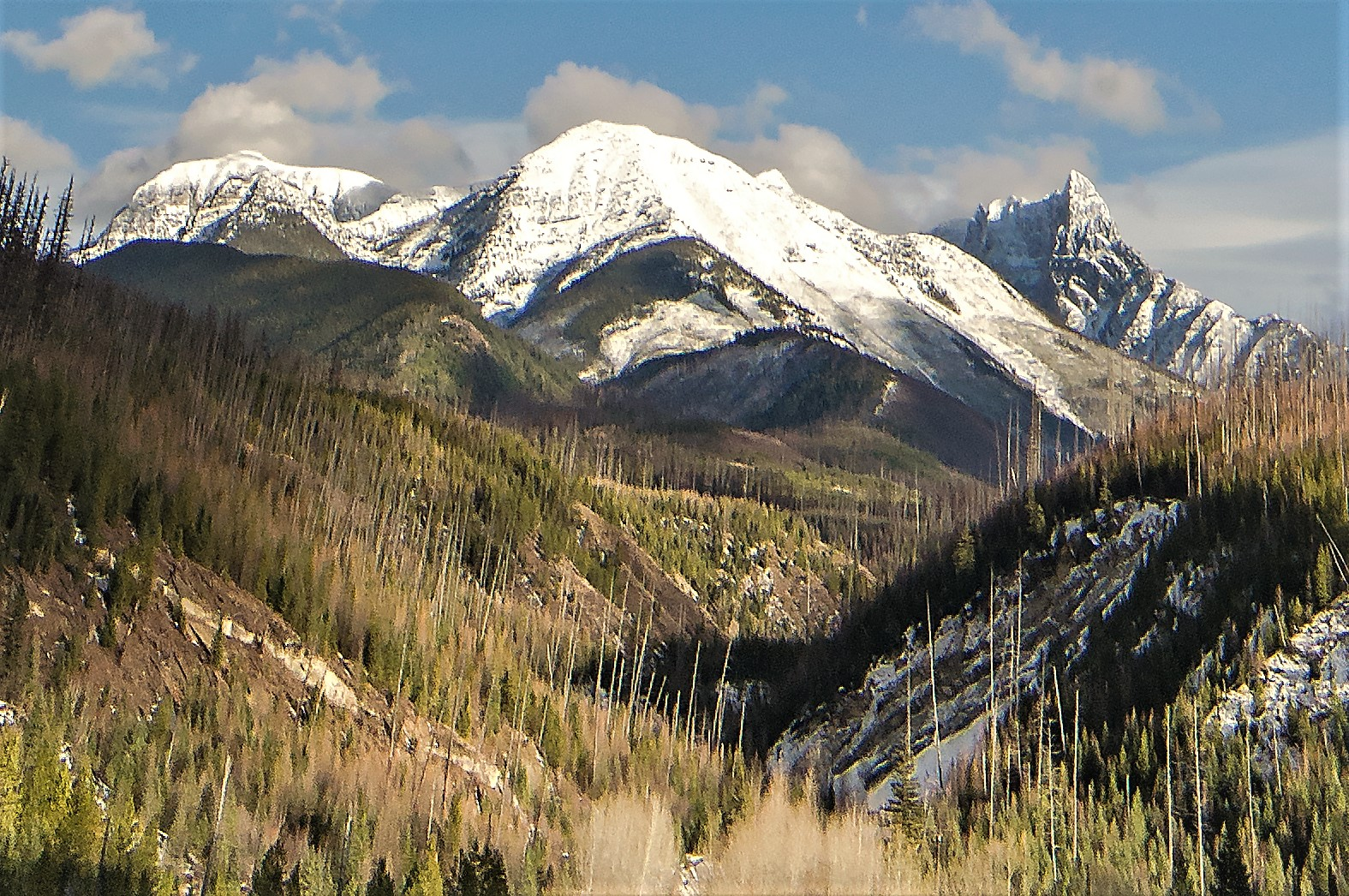
Wolftail Mountain centered

== See also ==
- Mountains and mountain ranges of Glacier National Park (U.S.)
