= Bad Marriage Mountain =

Mountain in the state of Montana

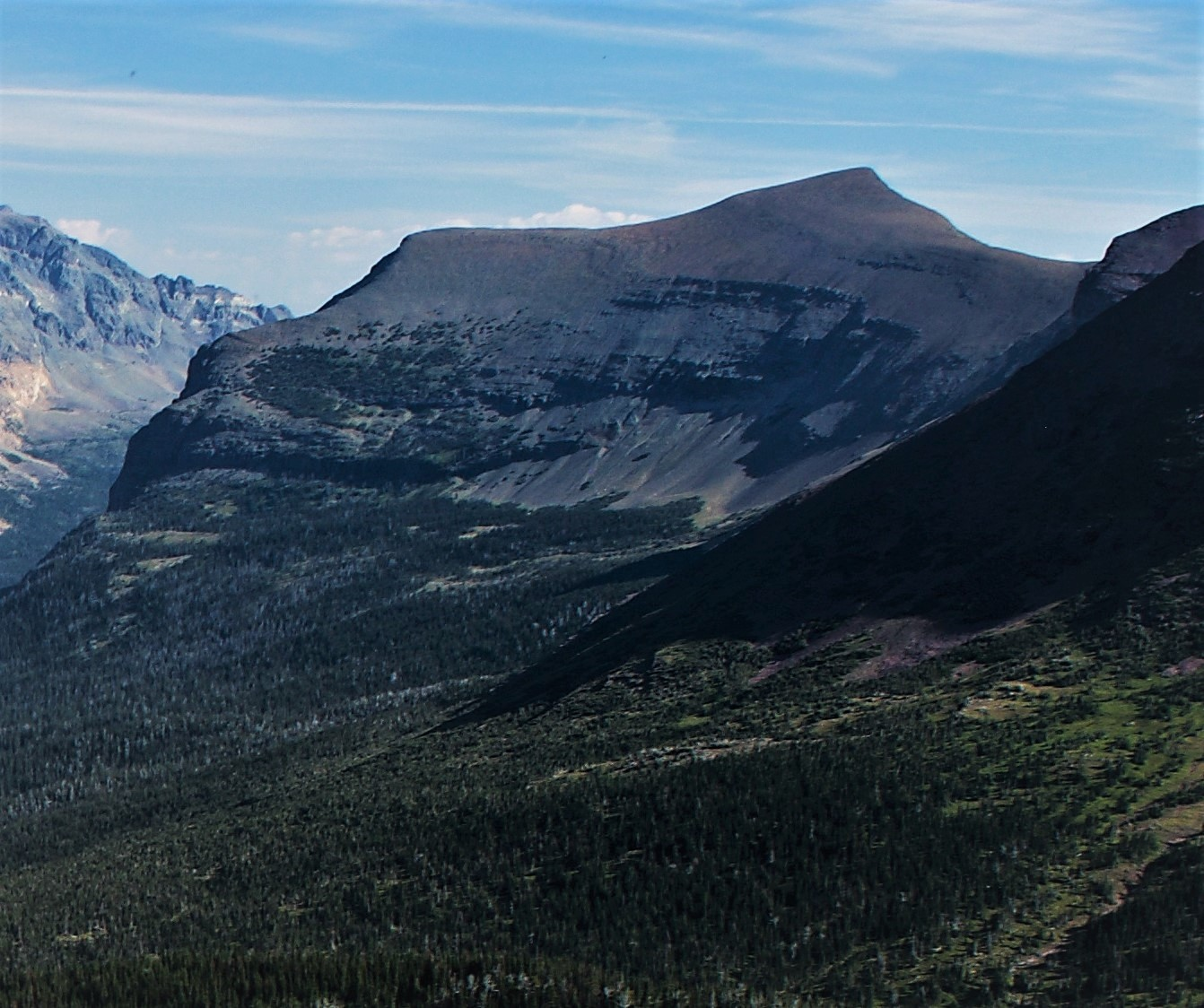
- South-southwest aspect

Highest point
- Elevation: 8,350 ft (2,550 m)
- Prominence: 490
- Coordinates: 48°34′3″N 113°25′9″W

Geography
- Location within Montana Location within the United States
- Location: Glacier County, Montana, U.S.
- Parent range: Lewis Range
- Topo map: USGS

Climbing
- Easiest route: Scramble

Bad Marriage Mountain (8,350 feet (2,545 m)) is located in the Lewis Range, Glacier National Park in the U.S. state of Montana. The mountain was named by Superintendent E. T. Scoyen for a Blackfoot Indian leader Bad Married. Bad Marriage Mountain became the accepted colloquial name. At one time, the summit was called Elk Tongue by J.W. Schultz, an early chronicler of park geography and activities. Because no Blackfoot equivalent to Elk Tongue was found, the English name was dropped and Bad Marriage Mountain became the official name.

== See also ==
- Mountains and mountain ranges of Glacier National Park (U.S.)

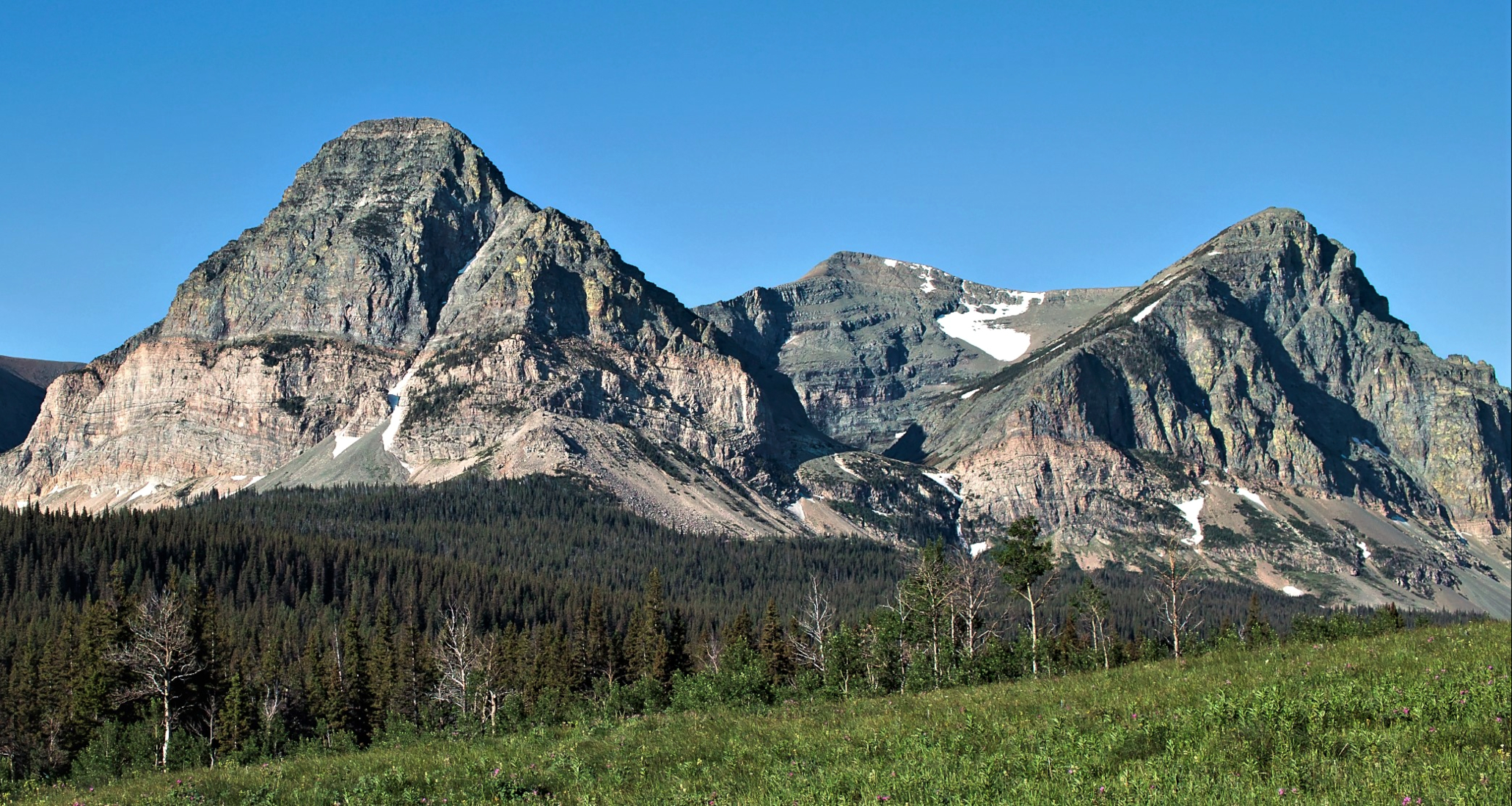
Bad Marriage Mountain from the north
