= Church Butte =

Mountain in Montana, United States

- Location within Montana Location within the United States

Highest point
- Elevation: 8,808 ft (2,685 m)
- Prominence: 938 ft (286 m)
- Coordinates: 48°22′54″N 113°30′49″W

Geography
- Location: Flathead County, Montana, U.S.
- Parent range: Lewis Range
- Topo map(s): USGS Mount Saint Nicholas, MT

Church Butte is a 8,816 feet (2,687 m) butte located in the Lewis Range, Glacier National Park in the U.S. state of Montana.

== See also ==
- Mountains and mountain ranges of Glacier National Park (U.S.)

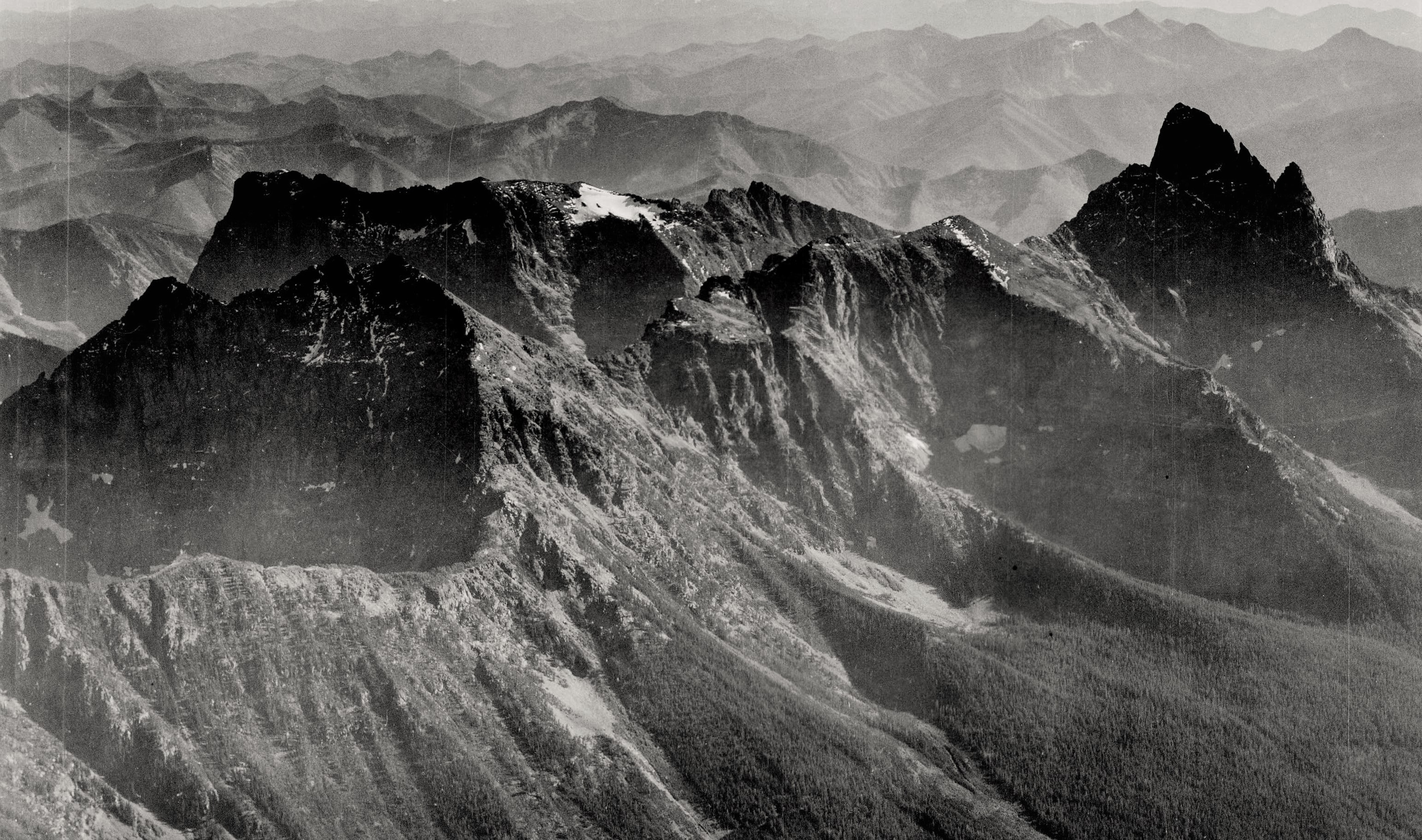
Aerial view looking south at Battlement Mountain (front left), Church Butte (behind left), and Mount Saint Nicholas (right).
