= Sherburne Peak =

Mountain in the state of Montana

- Location within Montana Location within the United States

Highest point
- Elevation: 8,578 ft (2,615 m)
- Prominence: 178 ft (54 m)
- Coordinates: 48°53′01″N 113°33′43″W

Geography
- Location: Glacier County, Montana, U.S.
- Parent range: Lewis Range
- Topo map(s): USGS Chief Mountain, MT

Sherburne Peak is a 8,578-foot-high (2,615 m) mountain located in the Lewis Range, Glacier National Park in the U.S. state of Montana. Sherburne Peak has two summits: the higher one being in Glacier National Park and the lower summit is located within the Blackfeet Indian Reservation.

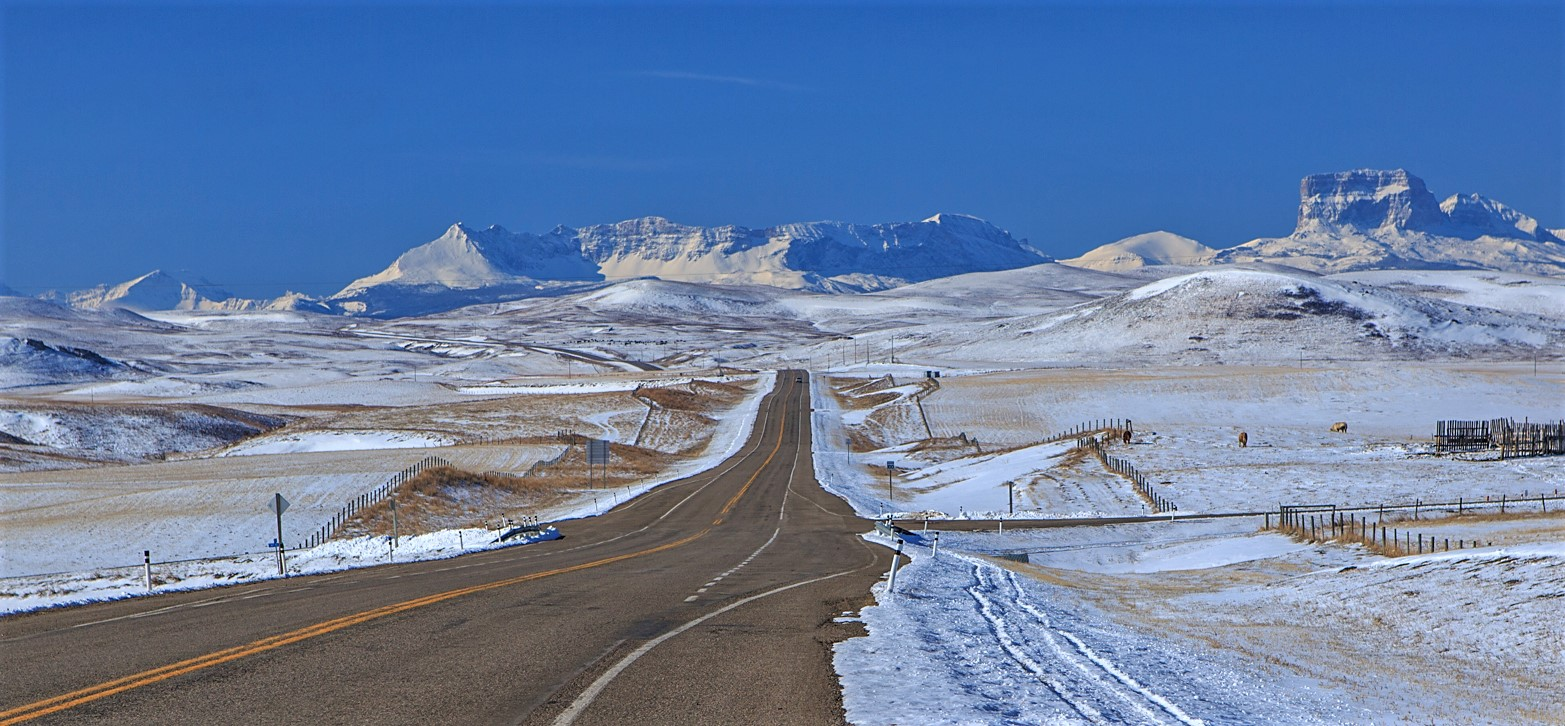
Sherburne Peak is at the left end of Yellow Mountain, which is centered. Chief Mountain to the right. Camera is pointed south.

== See also ==
- Mountains and mountain ranges of Glacier National Park (U.S.)
