= Mount Thompson (Montana) =

Mountain in United States of America

- Location within Montana Location within the United States

Highest point
- Elevation: 8,531 ft (2,600 m)
- Prominence: 447 ft (136 m)
- Coordinates: 48°32′45″N 113°41′16″W

Geography
- Location: Flathead County, Montana, U.S.
- Parent range: Lewis Range
- Topo map(s): USGS Mount Jackson, MT

Mount Thompson (8,531 feet (2,600 m)) is located in the Lewis Range, Glacier National Park in the U.S. state of Montana.

== See also ==
- Mountains and mountain ranges of Glacier National Park (U.S.)
