= Anaconda Peak =

Mountain in Montana, United States

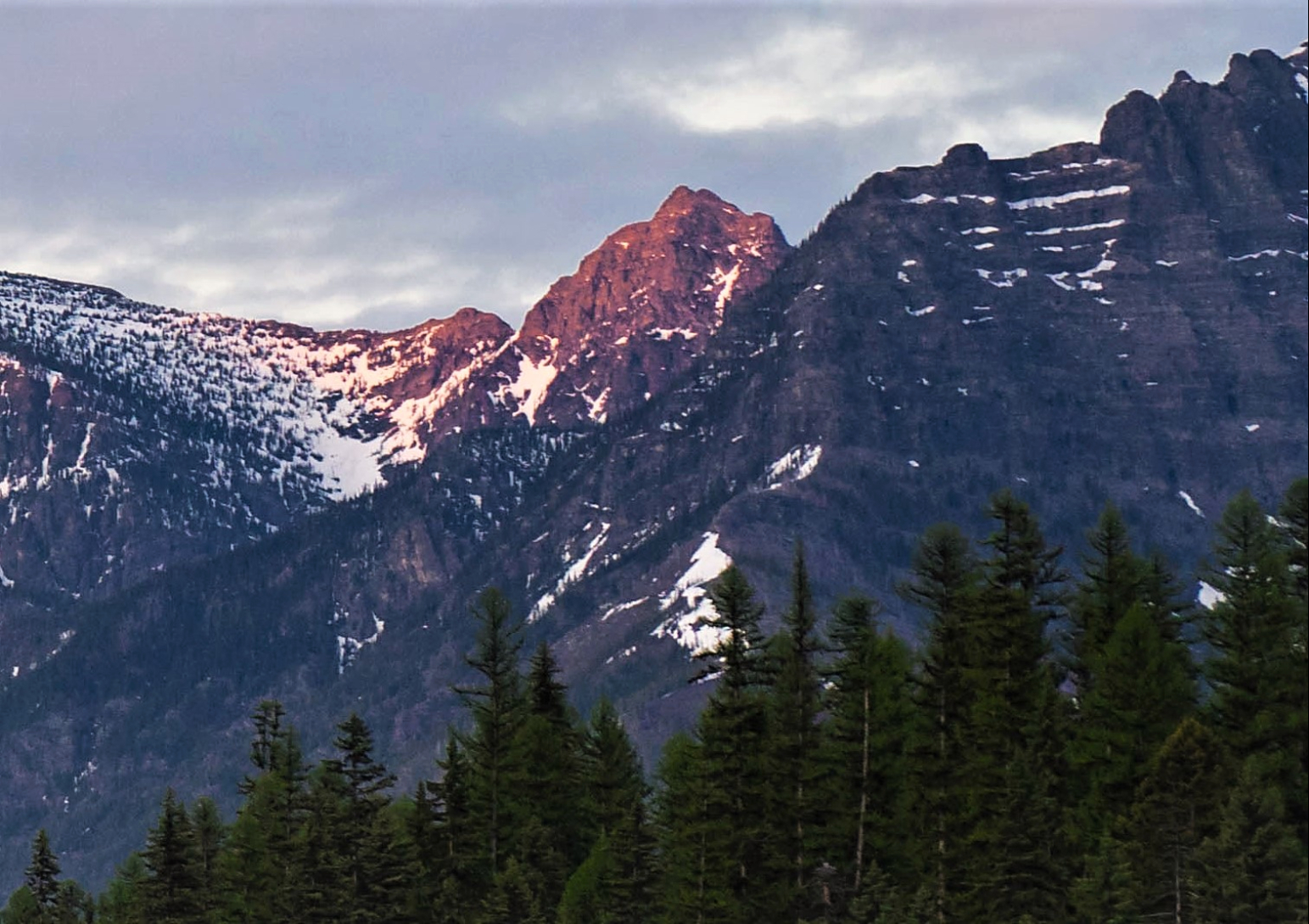
- West aspect, centered

Highest point
- Elevation: 8,279 ft (2,523 m)
- Prominence: 919 ft (280 m)
- Coordinates: 48°46′06″N 113°58′24″W

Geography
- Location within Montana Location within the United States
- Location: Flathead County, Montana, U.S.
- Parent range: Livingston Range
- Topo map(s): USGS Mount Geduhn, MT

Anaconda Peak (8,279 feet (2,523 m)) is located in the Livingston Range, Glacier National Park in the U.S. state of Montana, to the southeast of the eastern reaches of Logging Lake.

== Climate ==
Based on the Köppen climate classification, the peak is in an alpine subarctic climate zone with long, cold, snowy winters, and cool to warm summers. Temperatures can drop below −10 °F with wind chill factors below −30 °F.

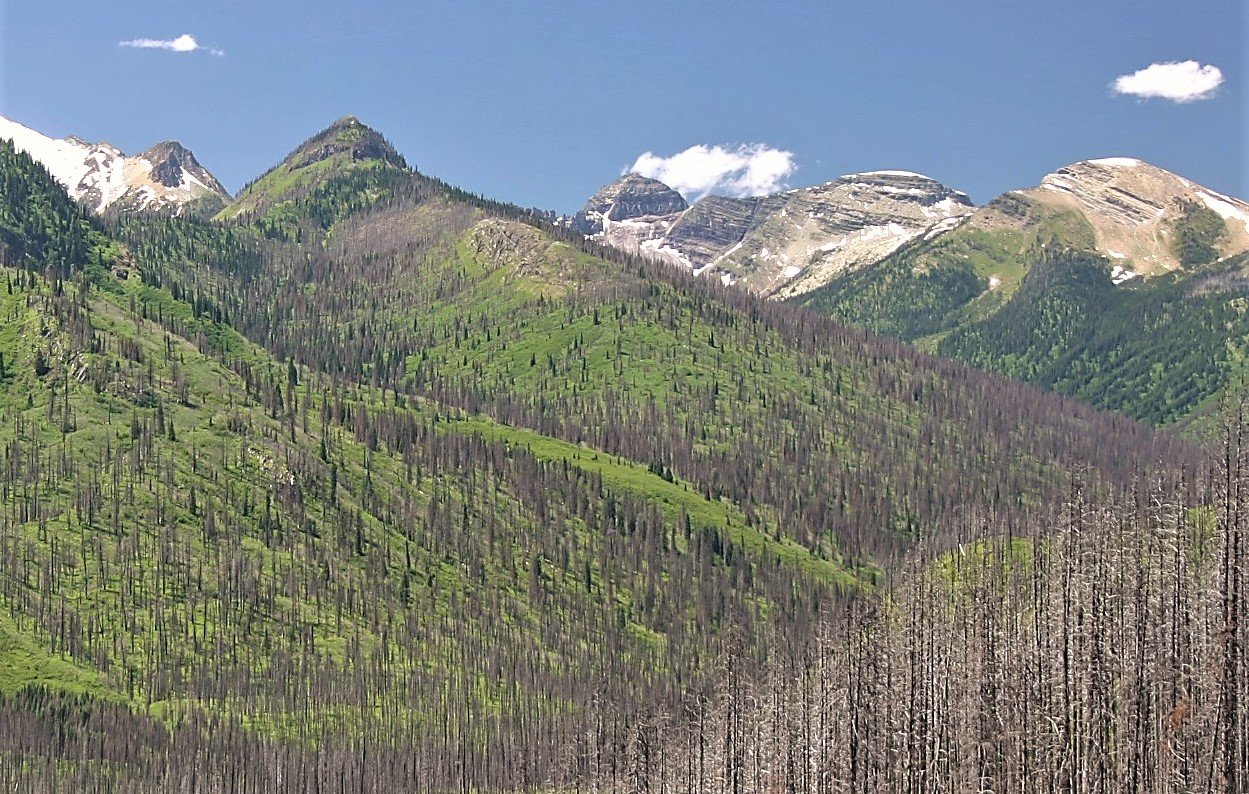
East aspect of Anaconda Peak centered on skyline, from Going-to-the-Sun Road

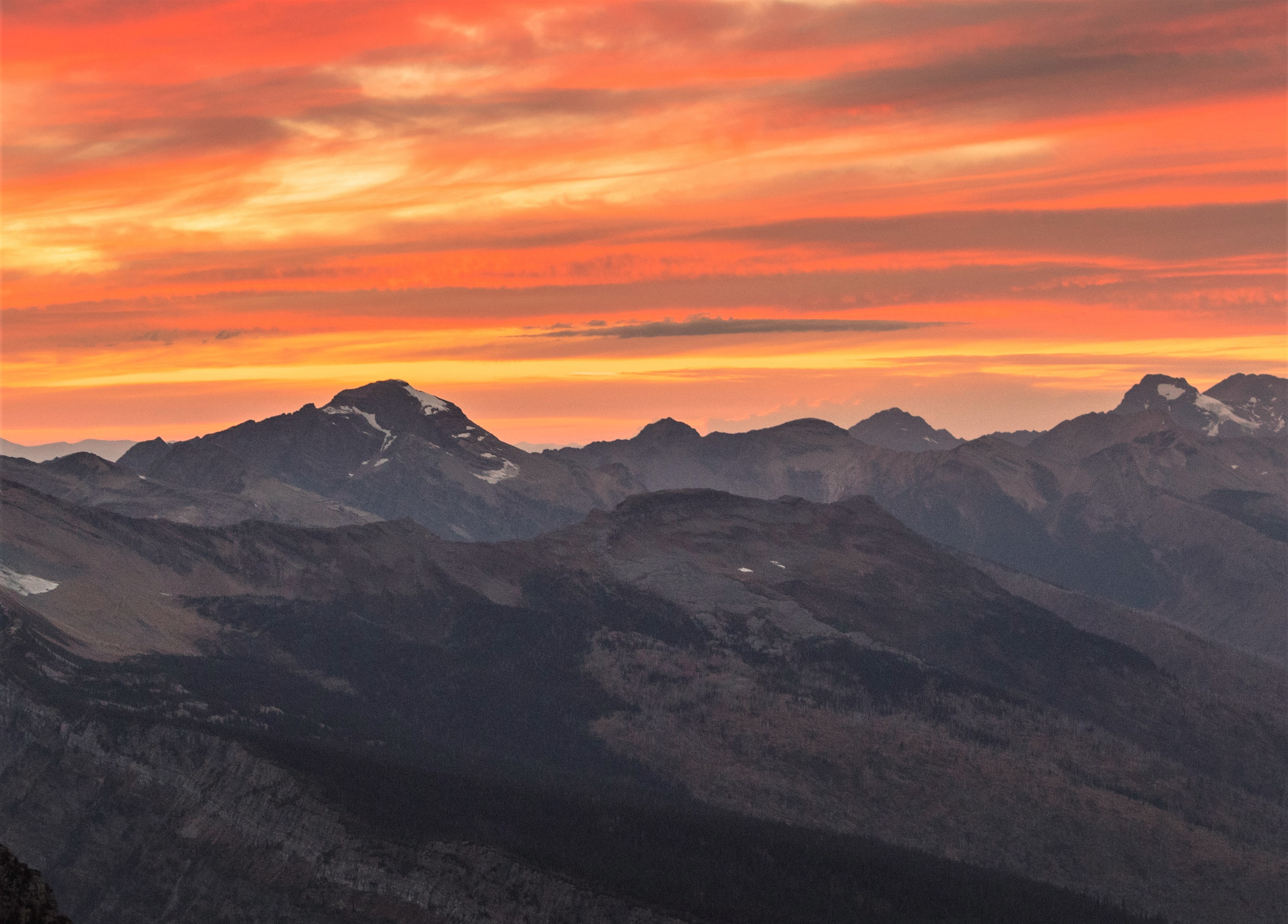
Anaconda Peak is a bump centered along skyline. Longfellow Peak to left. View from Logan Pass.

== See also ==
- List of mountains and mountain ranges of Glacier National Park (U.S.)
