= Reuter Peak =

Mountain in the American state of Montana

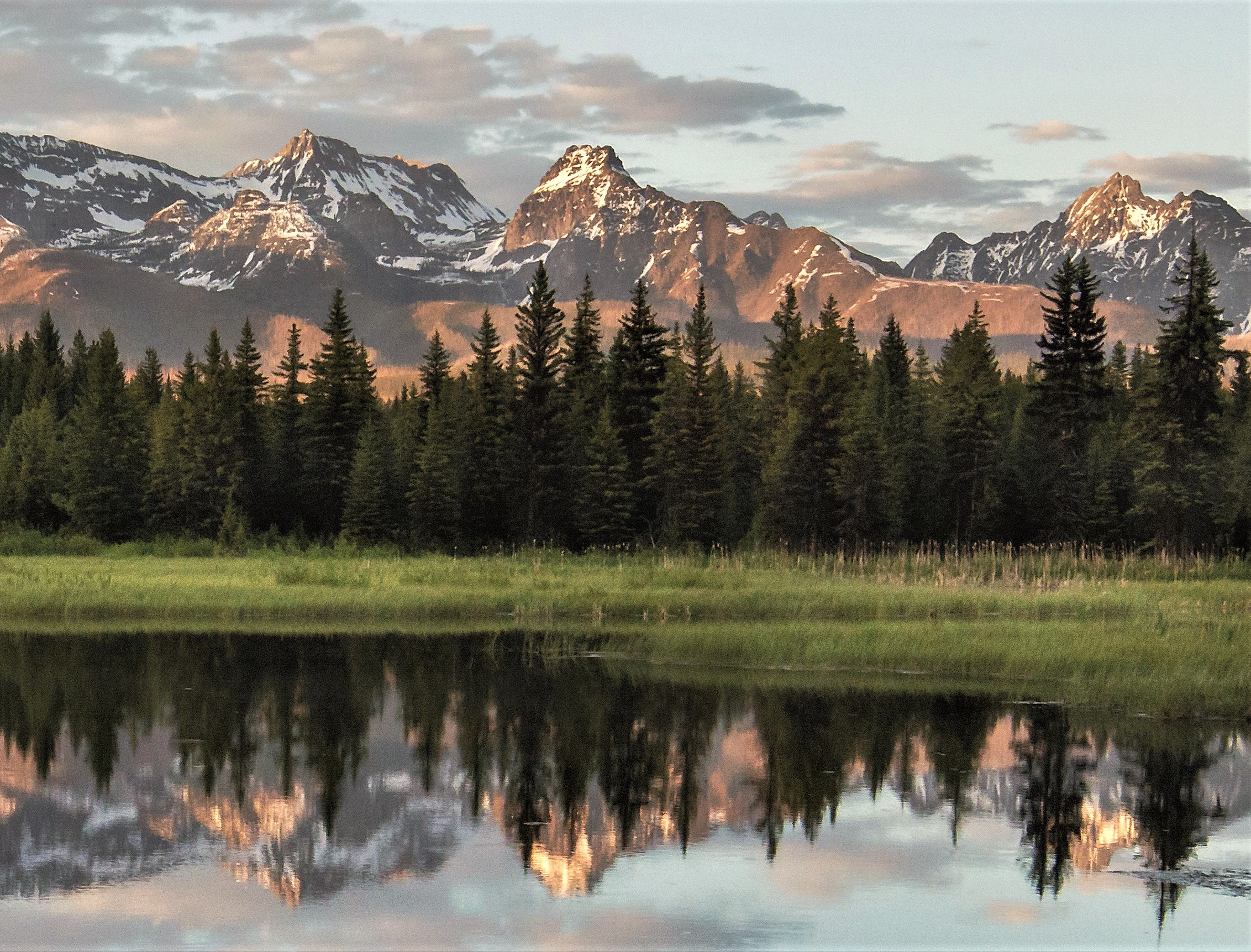
- West aspect, centered

Highest point
- Elevation: 8,763 ft (2,671 m) NAVD 88
- Prominence: 843 ft (257 m)
- Coordinates: 48°54′42″N 114°12′06″W

Geography
- Location within Montana Location within the United States
- Location: Flathead County, Montana, U.S.
- Parent range: Livingston Range
- Topo map(s): USGS Kintla Peak, MT

Reuter Peak (8,763 feet (2,671 m)) is located in the Livingston Range, Glacier National Park in the U.S. state of Montana.

== See also ==
- List of mountains and mountain ranges of Glacier National Park (U.S.)
