= Razoredge Mountain =

Mountain in Montana, United States

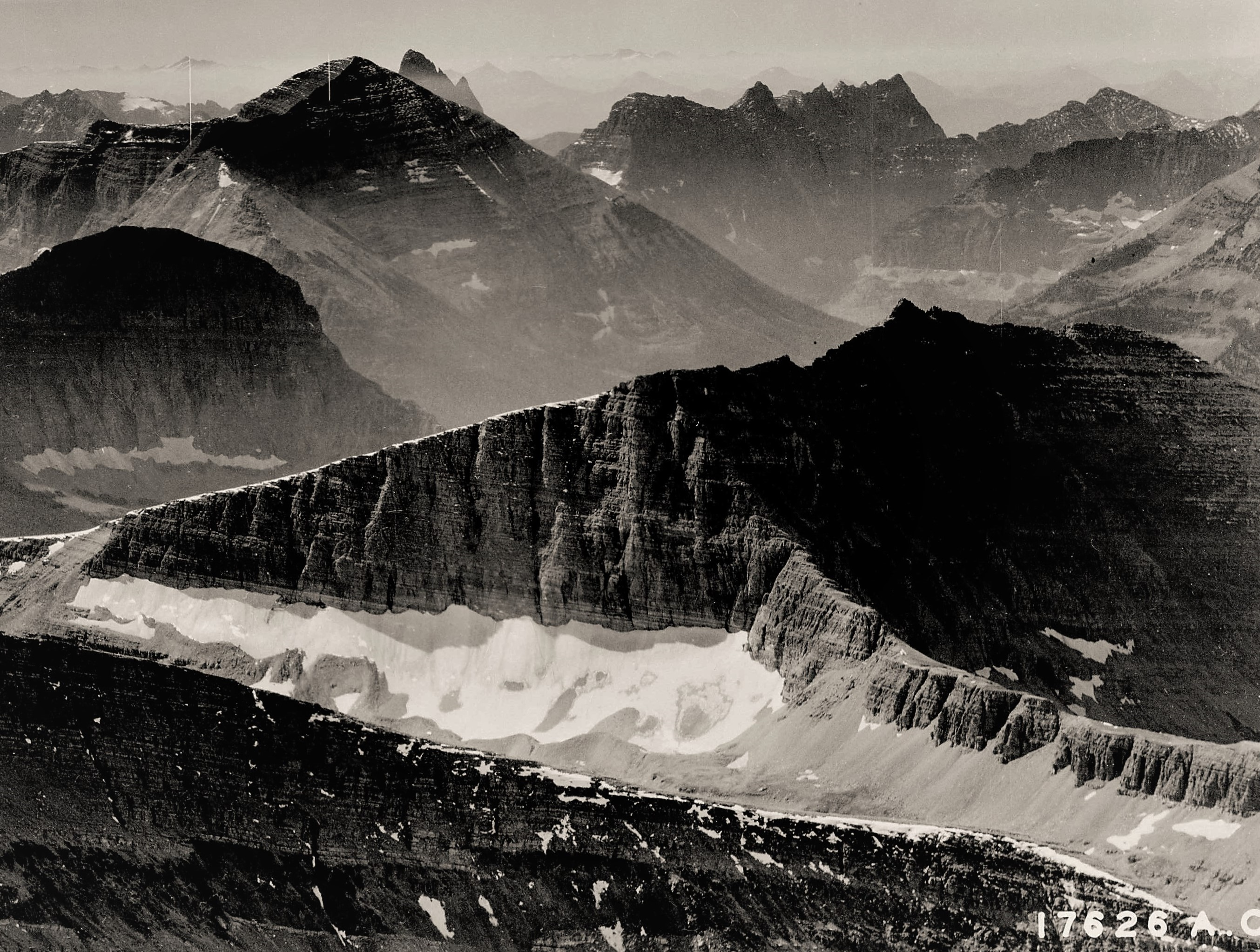
- Aerial view of north aspect in foreground right

Highest point
- Elevation: 8,570 ft (2,610 m) NAVD 88
- Prominence: 810 ft (250 m)
- Coordinates: 48°33′24″N 113°30′58″W

Geography
- Location within Montana Location within the United States
- Location: Flathead County, Montana, U.S.
- Parent range: Lewis Range
- Topo map(s): USGS Mount Stimson, MT

Razoredge Mountain (8,570 feet (2,612 m)) is located in the Lewis Range, Glacier National Park in the U.S. state of Montana.

== Geology ==
Like other mountains in Glacier National Park, Razoredge Mountain is composed of sedimentary rock laid down during the Precambrian to Jurassic periods. Formed in shallow seas, this sedimentary rock was initially uplifted beginning 170 million years ago when the Lewis Overthrust fault pushed an enormous slab of Precambrian rocks 3 mi (4.8 km) thick, 50 miles (80 km) wide and 160 miles (260 km) long over younger rock of the Cretaceous period.

== Climate ==
According to the Köppen climate classification system, Razoredge Mountain is located in an alpine subarctic climate zone with long, cold, snowy winters, and cool to warm summers. Winter temperatures can drop below −10 °F with wind chill factors below −30 °F. Due to its altitude, it receives precipitation all year, as snow in winter, and as thunderstorms in summer.

== Gallery ==
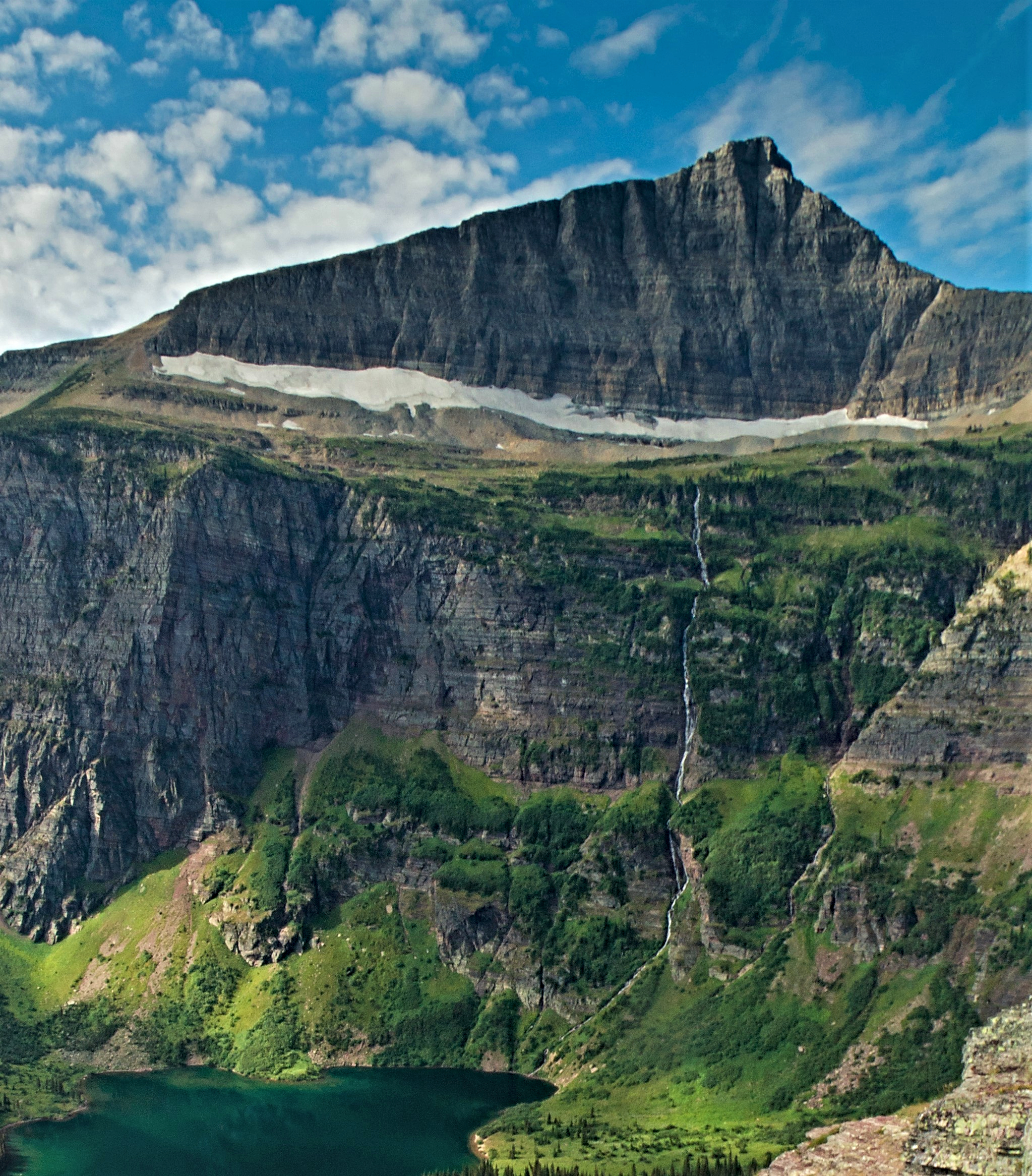
Northeast aspect above Medicine Grizzly Lake

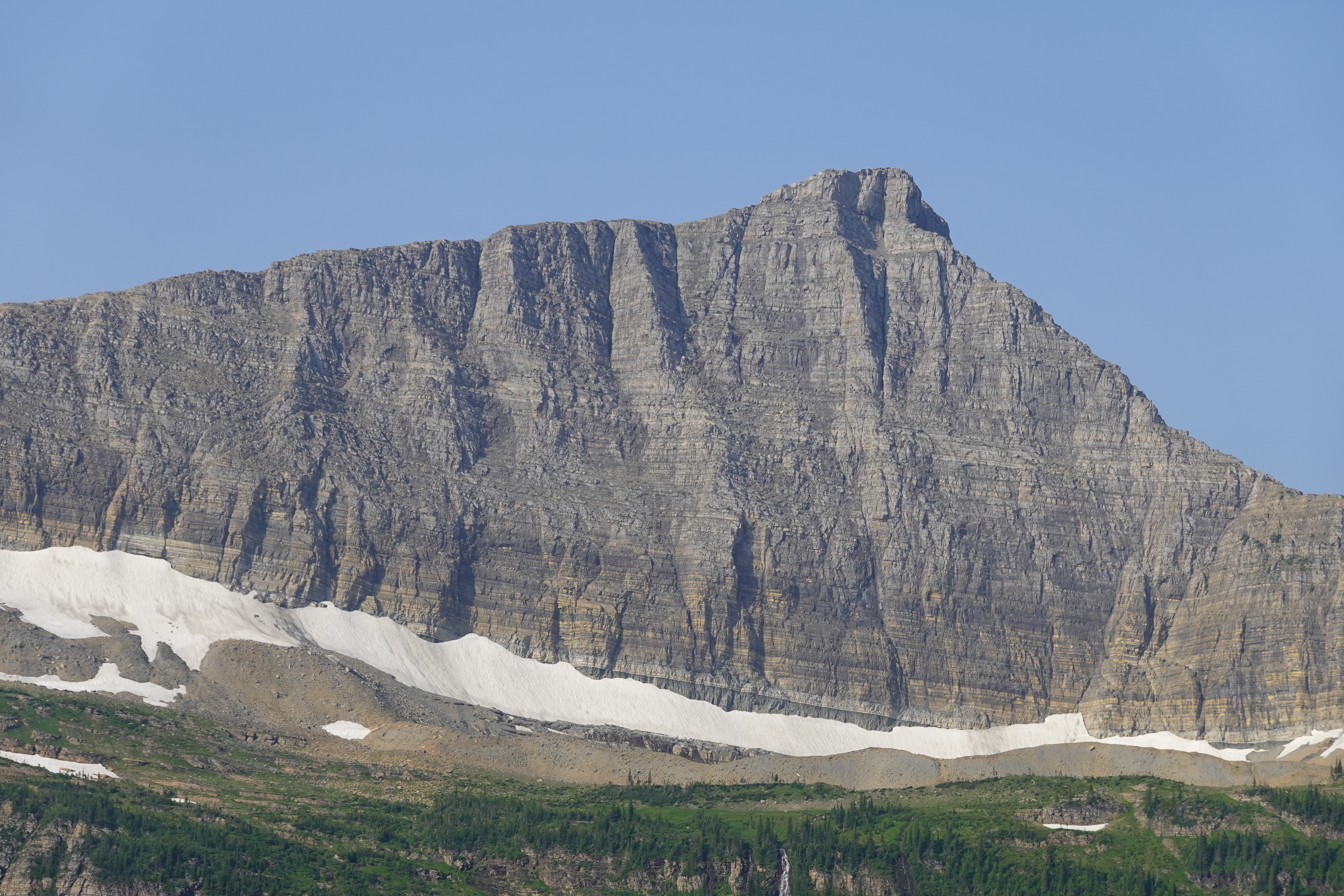
Northeast aspect

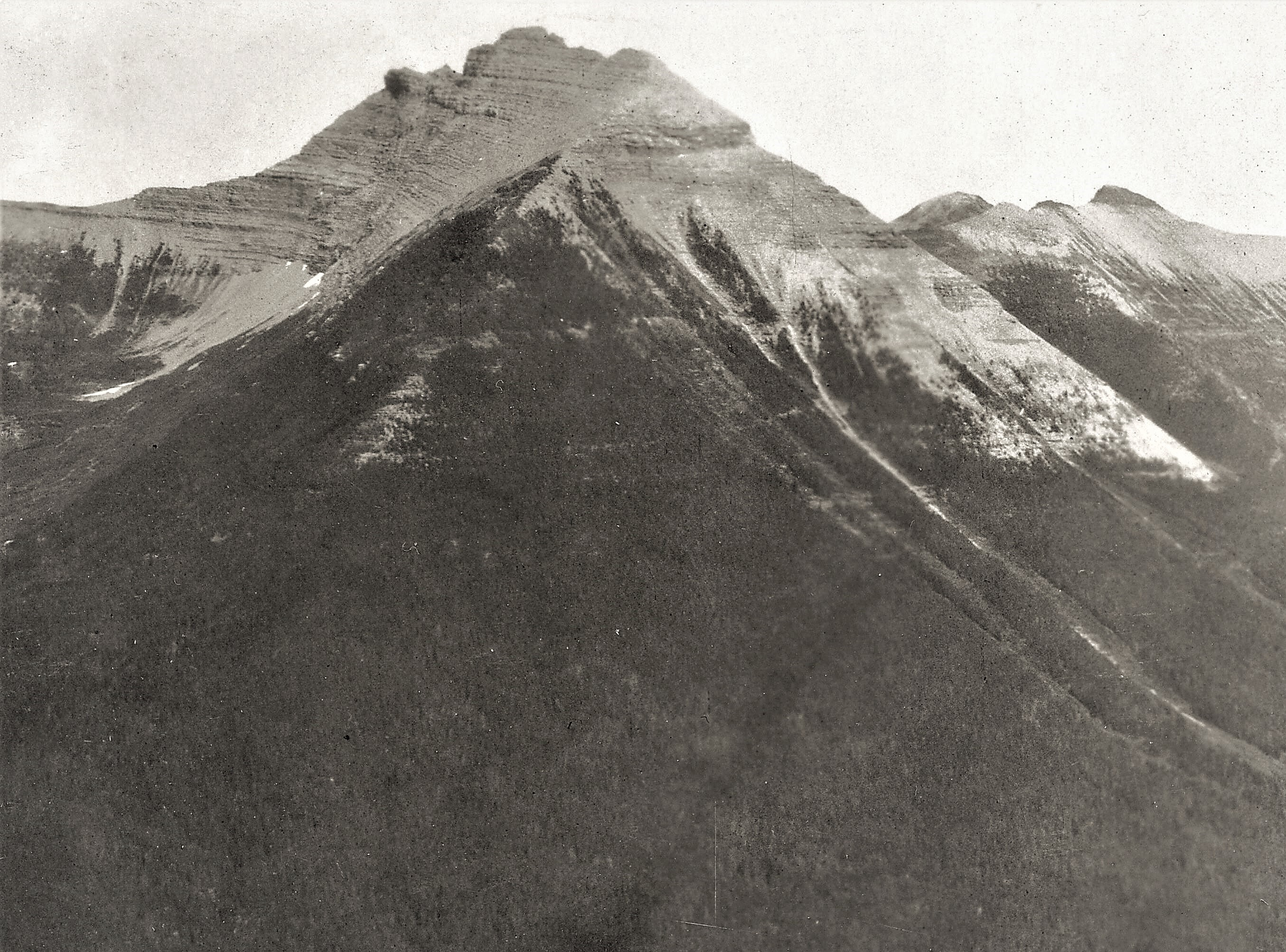
West aspect, 1914

== See also ==
- Mountains and mountain ranges of Glacier National Park (U.S.)
