= Grizzly Mountain (Montana) =

Mountain in the American state of Montana

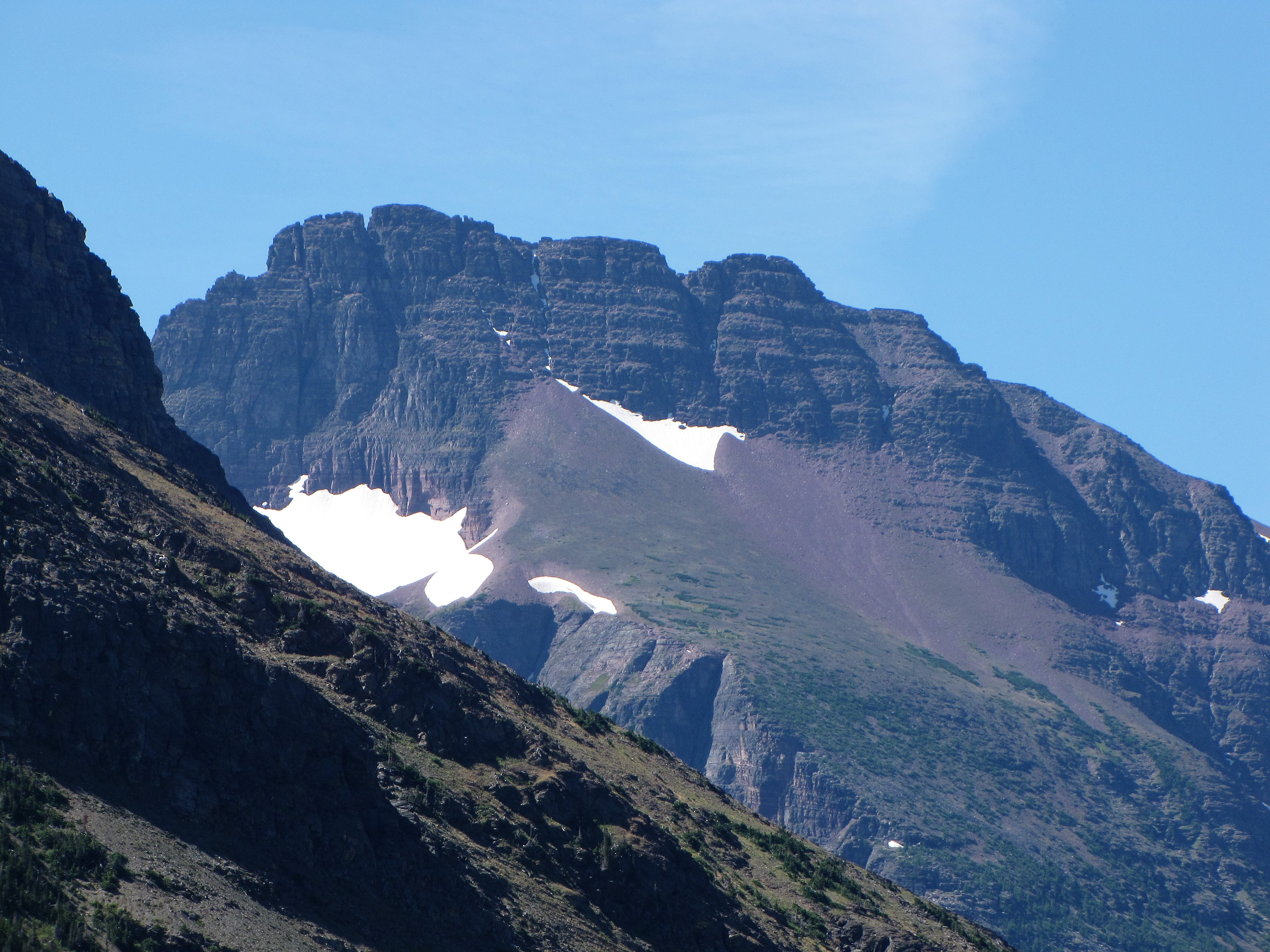
- Grizzly Mountain as seen from Two Medicine Lake

Highest point
- Elevation: 9,072 ft (2,765 m)
- Prominence: 1,707 ft (520 m)
- Coordinates: 48°25′07″N 113°24′07″W

Geography
- Location within Montana Location within the United States
- Location: Glacier County, Montana, Flathead County, Montana, U.S.
- Parent range: Lewis Range
- Topo map: USGS Mount Rockwell

Climbing
- Easiest route: Scramble

Grizzly Mountain (9,072 feet (2,765 m)) is located in the Lewis Range, Glacier National Park in the U.S. state of Montana. Grizzly Mountain sits astride the Continental Divide in the Two Medicine region of Glacier National Park.

== See also ==
- Mountains and mountain ranges of Glacier National Park (U.S.)
