= Boulder Peak =

Mountain in Montana, United States

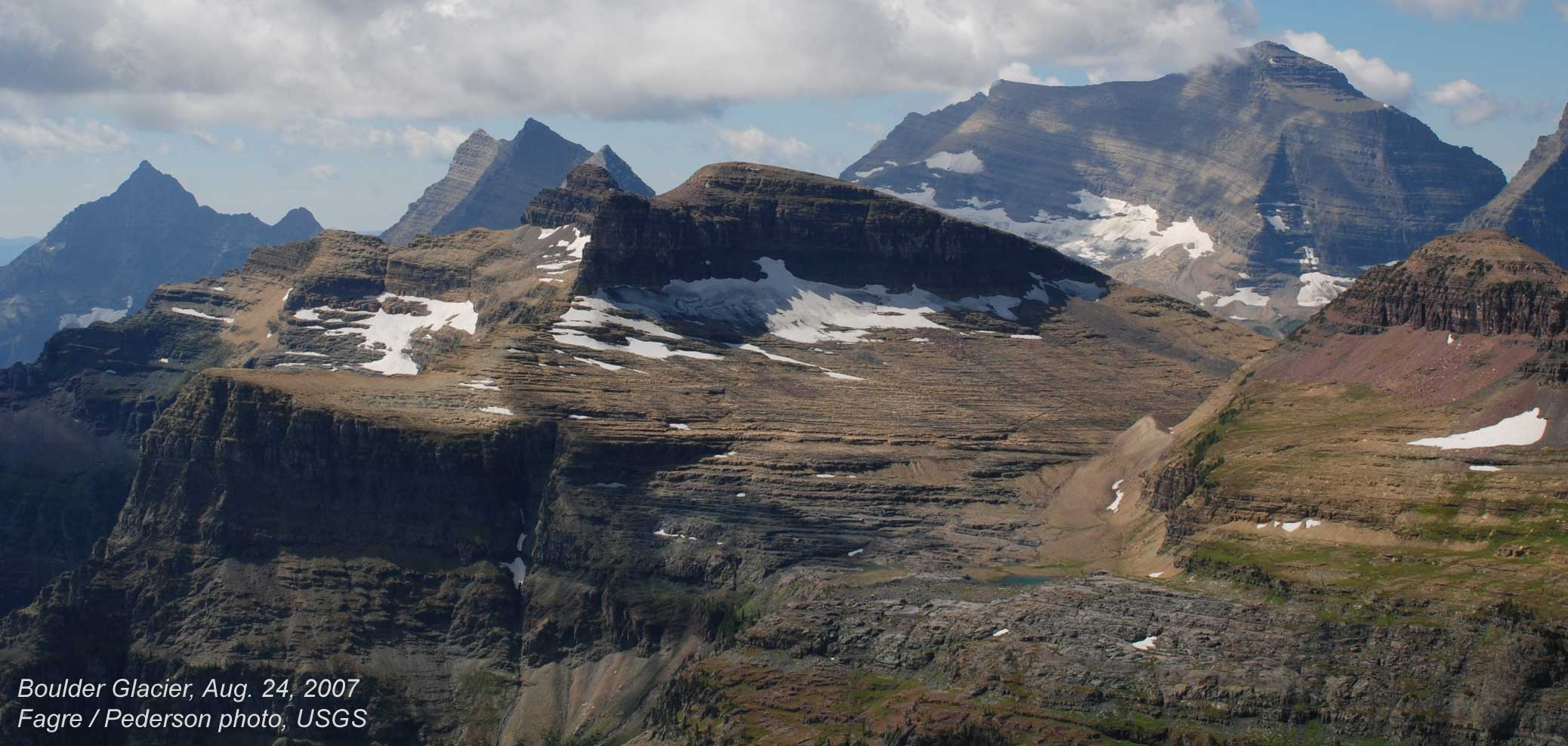
- Boulder Peak above remnant Boulder Glacier in center foreground

Highest point
- Elevation: 8,533 ft (2,601 m) NAVD 88
- Prominence: 1,058 ft (322 m)
- Coordinates: 48°57′20″N 114°05′28″W

Geography
- Location within Montana Location within the United States
- Location: Flathead County, Montana, U.S.
- Parent range: Livingston Range
- Topo map(s): USGS Mount Carter, MT

Climbing
- First ascent: Unknown
- Easiest route: Scramble

Boulder Peak (8,533 feet (2,601 m)) is located in the Livingston Range, Glacier National Park in the U.S. state of Montana. The remnant Boulder Glacier is situated on the northern slopes of the mountain.

== Climate ==
Based on the Köppen climate classification, Boulder Peak is located in a subarctic climate zone characterized by long, usually very cold winters, and short, cool to mild summers. Winter temperatures can drop below −10 °F (−23 °C) with wind chill factors below −30 °F (−34 °C)

== Geology ==
Boulder Peak is composed of sedimentary rock laid down during the Precambrian to Jurassic periods. Formed in shallow seas, this sedimentary rock was initially uplifted beginning 170 million years ago when the Lewis Overthrust fault pushed an enormous slab of precambrian rocks 3 mi (4.8 km) thick, 50 miles (80 km) wide and 160 miles (260 km) long over younger rock of the cretaceous period.

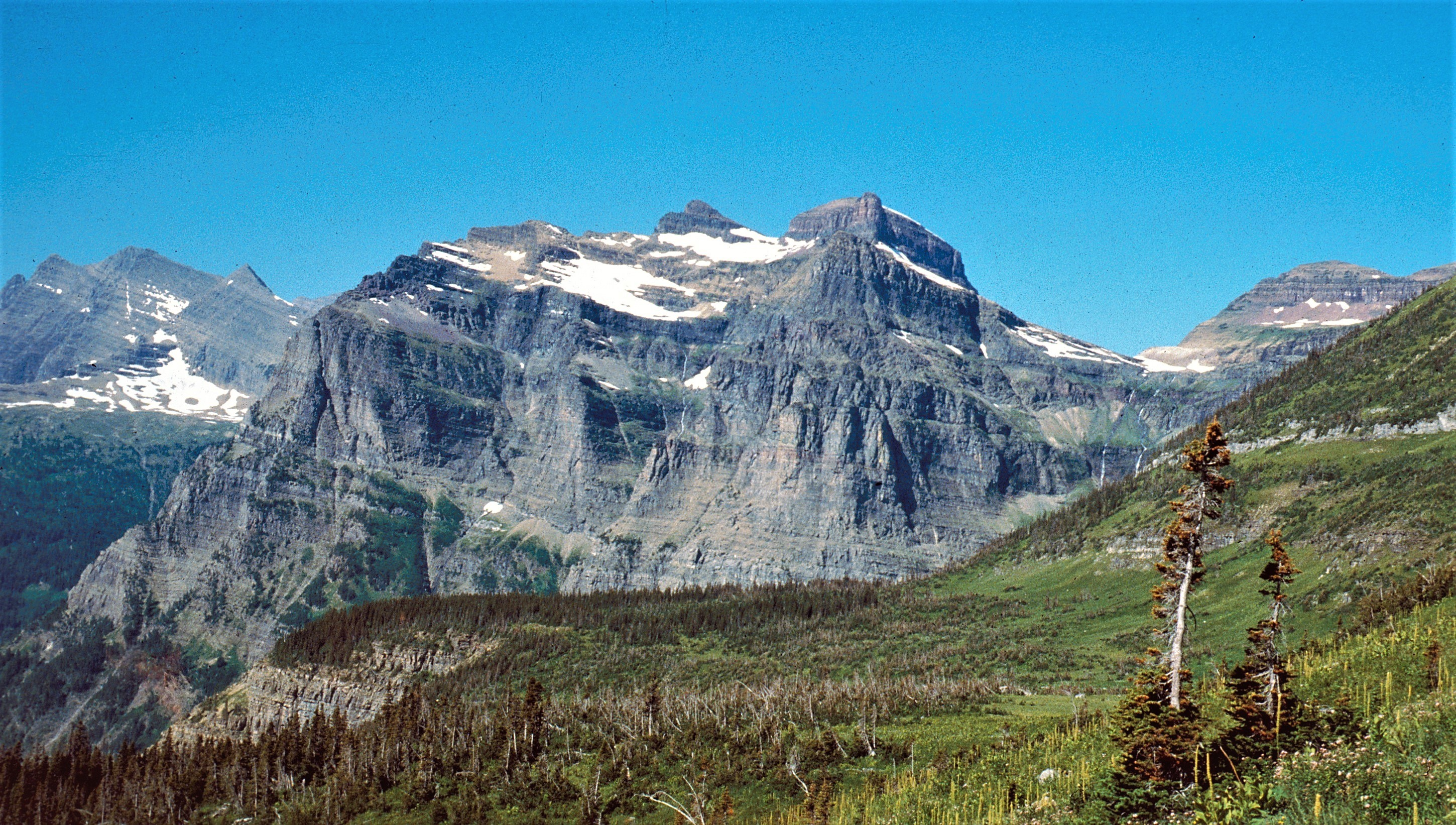
East aspect of Boulder Peak seen from Brown Pass

== See also ==
- List of mountains and mountain ranges of Glacier National Park (U.S.)
