= Kupunkamint Mountain =

Mountain in the American state of Montana

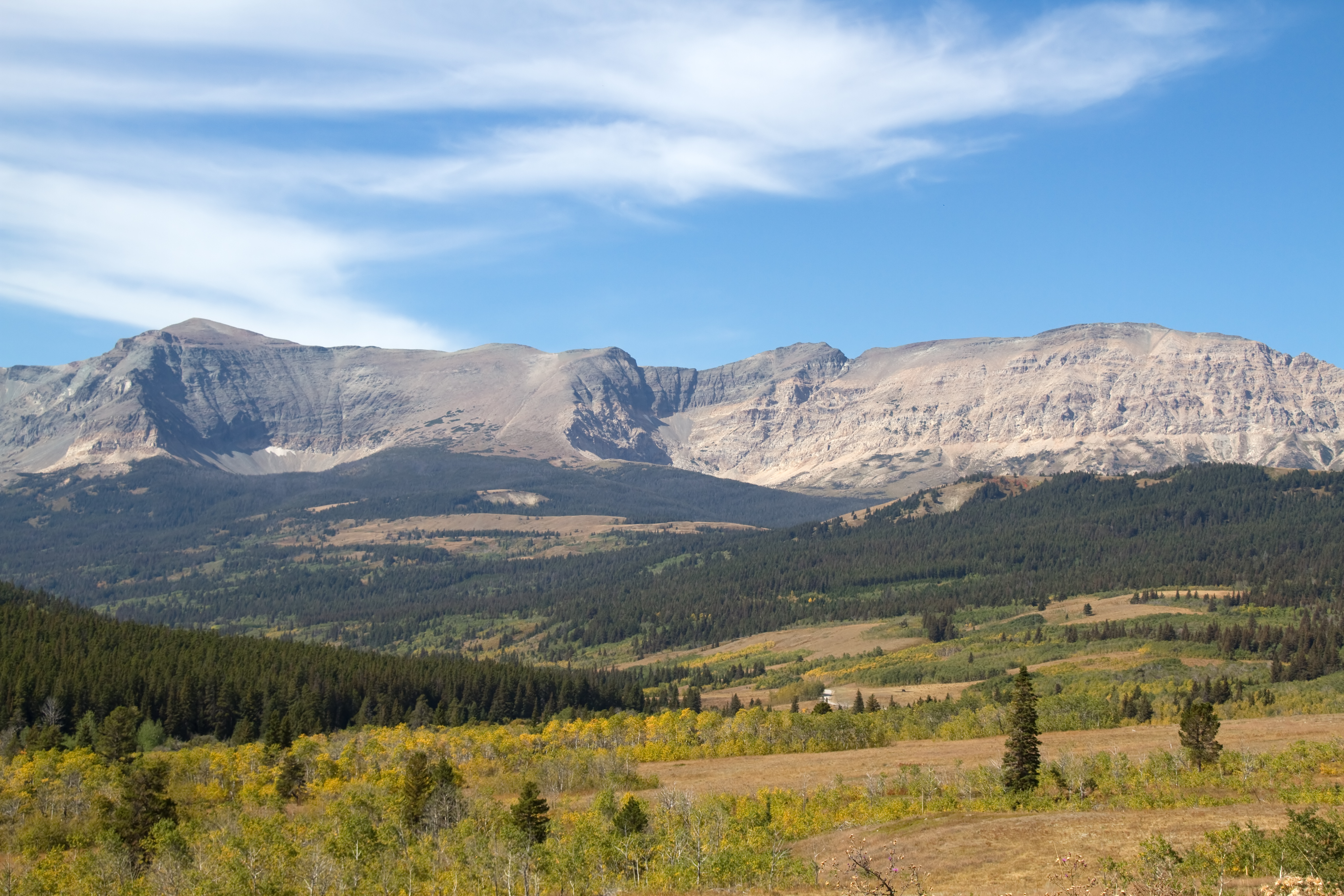
- Kupunkamint Mountain (left) (White Calf Mountain (right), from the east)

Highest point
- Elevation: 8,802 ft (2,683 m)
- Prominence: 357 ft (109 m)
- Coordinates: 48°37′06″N 113°25′18″W

Geography
- Location within Montana Location within the United States
- Location: Glacier County, Montana, U.S.
- Parent range: Lewis Range
- Topo map(s): USGS Cut Bank Pass, MT

Kupunkamint Mountain (8,802 feet (2,683 m)) is located in the Lewis Range, Glacier National Park in the U.S. state of Montana. Kupunkamint Mountain is in the southeastern section of Glacier National Park. The mountain's name was officially adopted in 1940 by the United States Board on Geographic Names to commemorate a Kootenai Indian.

== See also ==
- Mountains and mountain ranges of Glacier National Park (U.S.)
