= Salvage Mountain =

Mountain in the state of Montana

- Location within Montana Location within the United States

Highest point
- Elevation: 8,328 ft (2,538 m)
- Prominence: 208 ft (63 m)
- Coordinates: 48°22′30″N 113°31′52″W

Geography
- Location: Flathead County, Montana, U.S.
- Parent range: Lewis Range
- Topo map(s): USGS Mount Saint Nicholas, MT

Salvage Mountain (8,328 feet (2,538 m)) is located in the Lewis Range, Glacier National Park in the U.S. state of Montana.

== See also ==
- List of mountains and mountain ranges of Glacier National Park (U.S.)
