= List of mountains and mountain ranges of Glacier National Park (U.S.) =

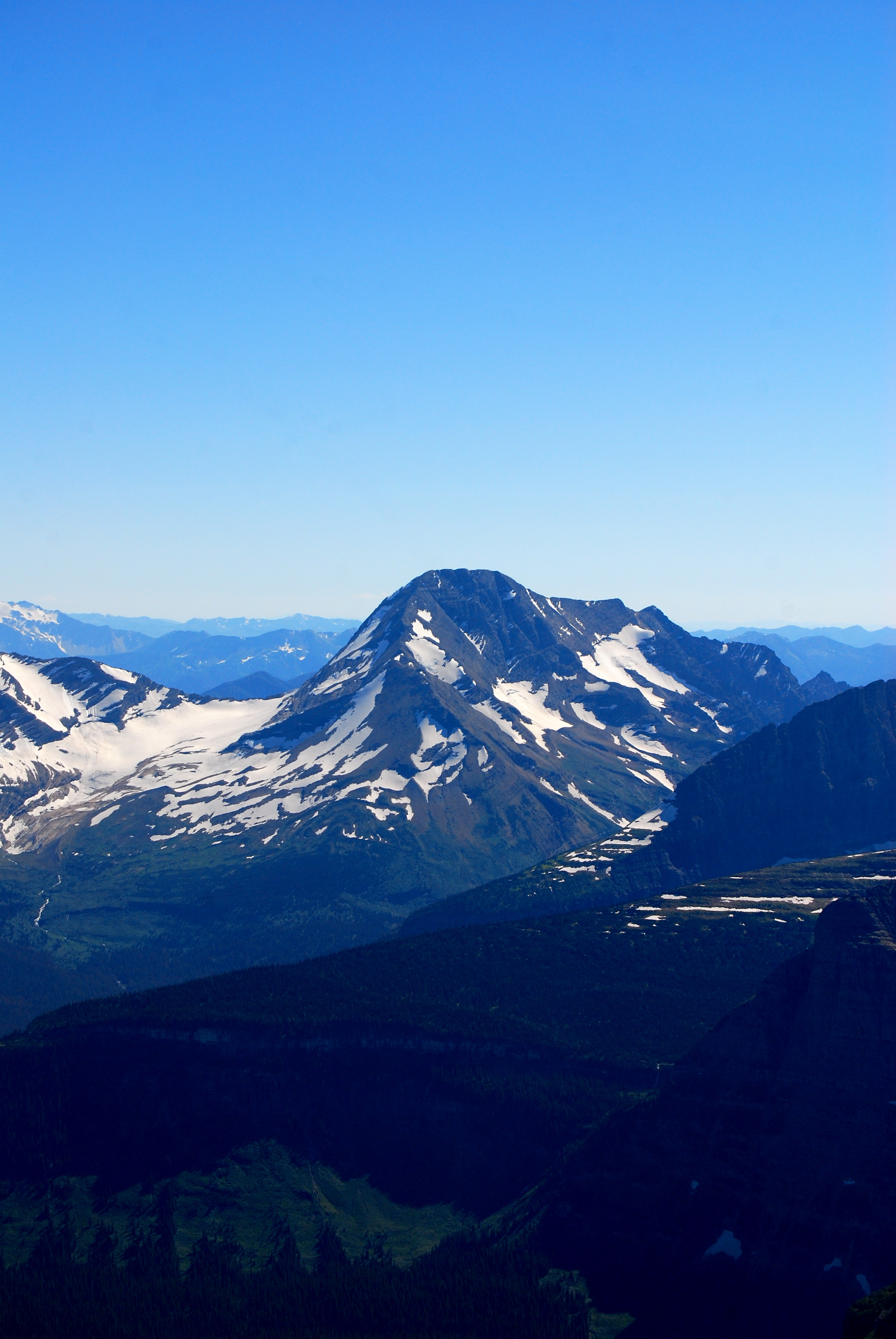
Mount Jackson as viewed from the summit Mount Siyeh, another of Glacier National Park's 10,000 foot peaks. Jackson Glacier lies directly to the left of the mountain.

Mountains in Glacier National Park (U.S.) are part of the Rocky Mountains. There are at least 150 named mountain peaks over 8,000 feet (2,400 m) in Glacier in three mountain ranges--the Clark Range, Lewis Range, Livingston Range. Mount Cleveland at 10,479 feet (3,194 m) is the highest peak in the park. Many peaks in Glacier National Park have both English and anglicized versions of native American names. The names listed here reflect the official names in the USGS U.S. Board on Geographic Names database.

== Clark Range ==
The Clark Range is mostly in the Canadian Provinces of Alberta and British Columbia, but a small portion of the range is also in the far northwestern section of the park in Montana.

- Long Knife Peak - 48°59′50″N 114°12′28″W; 9,708 feet (2,959 m)

== Lewis Range ==
The Lewis Range traverses the park in a generally north to south direction on the eastern side of the continental divide.

- Ahern Peak - 48°49′51″N 113°46′56″W: 8,749 feet (2,667 m)
- Allen Mountain - 48°45′29″N 113°39′27″W: 9,376 feet (2,858 m)
- Almost-a-Dog Mountain - 48°37′22″N 113°37′08″W: 8,922 feet (2,719 m)
- Amphitheater Mountain - 48°35′59″N 113°29′15″W: 8,690 feet (2,650 m)
- Angel Wing - 48°45′26″N 113°42′42″W: 7,398 feet (2,255 m)
- Apikuni Mountain - 48°50′11″N 113°39′14″W: 9,068 feet (2,764 m)
- Appistoki Peak - 48°28′04″N 113°21′15″W: 8,164 feet (2,488 m)
- Bad Marriage Mountain - 48°34′03″N 113°25′09″W: 8,350 feet (2,550 m)
- Battlement Mountain - 48°24′53″N 113°31′05″W; 8,832 feet (2,692 m)
- Bear Mountain - 48°57′18″N 113°45′27″W: 8,841 feet (2,695 m)
- Bearhat Mountain - 48°40′01″N 113°45′49″W; 8,674 feet (2,644 m)
- Bearhead Mountain - 48°25′27″N 113°21′21″W: 8,406 feet (2,562 m)
- Bishops Cap - 48°43′29″N 113°42′33″W: 9,127 feet (2,782 m)
- Blackfoot Mountain - 48°34′55″N 113°40′06″W: 9,574 feet (2,918 m)
- Brave Dog Mountain - 48°21′32″N 113°27′40″W; 8,474 feet (2,583 m)
- Calf Robe Mountain - 48°23′15″N 113°19′59″W: 7,948 feet (2,423 m)
- Caper Peak - 48°26′02″N 113°29′54″W; 8,268 feet (2,520 m)
- Cathedral Peak - 48°52′08″N 113°51′58″W: 9,041 feet (2,756 m)
- Chief Mountain - 48°55′58″N 113°36′33″W: 9,080 feet (2,770 m)
- Church Butte - 48°22′54″N 113°30′49″W; 8,816 feet (2,687 m)
- Citadel Mountain - 48°37′56″N 113°39′18″W: 9,030 feet (2,750 m)
- Clements Mountain - 48°41′35″N 113°44′25″W: 8,671 feet (2,643 m)
- Cloudcroft Peaks - 48°26′02″N 113°34′08″W; 8,674 feet (2,644 m)
- Clyde Peak - 48°35′17″N 113°37′02″W: 8,610 feet (2,620 m)
- Cracker - 48°43′56″N 113°38′17″W: 9,833 feet (2,997 m)
- Crowfeet Mountain - 48°50′13″N 113°41′49″W: 8,750 feet (2,670 m)
- Curly Bear Mountain - 48°39′32″N 113°27′21″W: 8,099 feet (2,469 m)
- Divide Mountain - 48°39′55″N 113°24′03″W: 8,629 feet (2,630 m)
- Eagle Plume Mountain - 48°33′11″N 113°25′03″W: 8,724 feet (2,659 m)
- Eagle Ribs Mountain - 48°24′22″N 113°25′02″W; 8,140 feet (2,480 m)
- Eaglehead Mountain - 48°28′25″N 113°36′19″W; 9,098 feet (2,773 m)
- East Flattop Mountain - 48°44′22″N 113°31′16″W: 8,356 feet (2,547 m)

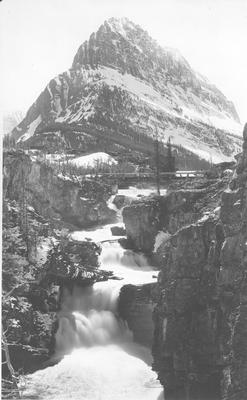
Black and white photo of Grinnell Point and waterfall, Glacier National Park, Montana. Photo by T. J. Hileman. Part of James Willard Schultz Photos and Personal Papers Collection, Montana State University.

- Edwards Mountain - 48°37′22″N 113°47′10″W; 9,012 feet (2,747 m)
- Elk Mountain - 48°18′24″N 113°26′40″W: 7,835 feet (2,388 m)
- Flinsch Peak - 48°29′54″N 113°27′58″W: 9,225 feet (2,812 m)
- Fusillade Mountain - 48°38′25″N 113°43′21″W: 8,596 feet (2,620 m)
- Gable Mountain - 48°54′22″N 113°40′25″W: 9,262 feet (2,823 m)
- Goat Haunt Mountain - 48°57′03″N 113°50′55″W: 8,641 feet (2,634 m)
- Goat Mountain - 48°42′18″N 113°35′26″W: 8,826 feet (2,690 m)
- Going-to-the-Sun Mountain - 48°41′27″N 113°38′11″W: 9,642 feet (2,939 m)
- Grinnell Point - 48°47′15″N 113°40′58″W: 7,604 feet (2,318 m)
- Grizzly Mountain - 48°25′07″N 113°24′07″W: 9,067 feet (2,764 m)
- Gunsight Mountain - 48°37′09″N 113°45′12″W: 9,258 feet (2,822 m)
- Iceberg Peak - 48°48′52″N 113°45′36″W: 9,150 feet (2,790 m)
- Ipasha Peak - 48°51′06″N 113°47′11″W: 9,557 feet (2,913 m)
- Kaina Mountain - 48°57′14″N 113°47′55″W: 9,462 feet (2,884 m)
- Kaiser Point - 48°55′56″N 113°50′01″W: 10,001 feet (3,048 m)
- Kootenai Peak - 48°53′25″N 113°56′30″W: 8,524 feet (2,598 m)
- Kupunkamint Mountain - 48°37′06″N 113°25′18″W: 8,763 feet (2,671 m)
- Little Chief Mountain - 48°38′41″N 113°35′42″W: 9,406 feet (2,867 m)
- Little Dog Mountain - 48°20′35″N 113°23′13″W: 8,573 feet (2,613 m)
- Little Matterhorn - 48°38′08″N 113°47′07″W: 7,886 feet (2,404 m)
- Lone Walker Mountain - 48°27′12″N 113°28′44″W: 8,396 feet (2,559 m)
- Mad Wolf Mountain - 48°34′04″N 113°22′07″W: 8,327 feet (2,538 m)
- Mahtotopa Mountain - 48°39′06″N 113°34′09″W: 8,599 feet (2,621 m)
- Matahpi Peak - 48°42′24″N 113°38′21″W: 9,311 feet (2,838 m)
- McClintock Peak - 48°31′30″N 113°28′21″W: 8,264 feet (2,519 m)
- Medicine Grizzly Peak - 48°33′34″N 113°27′55″W; 8,153 feet (2,485 m)
- Medicine Owl Peak - 48°36′32″N 113°29′43″W: 8,268 feet (2,520 m)
- Miche Wabun Peak - 48°58′11″N 113°49′52″W: 8,842 feet (2,695 m)
- Mount Brown -48°38′18″N 113°49′04″W; 8,438 feet (2,572 m)
- Mount Cannon - 48°41′33″N 113°46′27″W; 8,829 feet (2,691 m)
- Mount Cleveland - 48°55′30″N 113°50′53″W: 10,466 feet (3,190 m)
- Mount Despair - 48°23′56″N 113°25′54″W; 8,543 feet (2,604 m)
- Mount Doody - 48°25′48″N 113°34′33″W; 8,651 feet (2,637 m)
- Mount Ellsworth - 48°26′11″N 113°22′08″W: 8,573 feet (2,613 m)
- Mount Gould - 48°44′34″N 113°42′52″W: 9,527 feet (2,904 m)
- Mount Grinnell - 48°46′36″N 113°43′37″W: 8,812 feet (2,686 m)
- Mount Helen - 48°28′29″N 113°28′00″W: 8,520 feet (2,600 m)
- Mount Henkel - 48°49′18″N 113°41′00″W: 8,720 feet (2,660 m)
- Mount Henry - 48°27′12″N 113°20′36″W: 8,799 feet (2,682 m)
- Mount Jackson - 48°36′02″N 113°43′19″W: 10,039 feet (3,060 m)
- Mount James - 48°35′04″N 113°29′32″W: 9,373 feet (2,857 m)
- Mount Kipp - 48°51′22″N 113°50′26″W: 8,812 feet (2,686 m)
- Mount Logan - 48°36′02″N 113°38′30″W: 9,226 feet (2,812 m)
- Mount Merritt - 48°52′13″N 113°47′11″W: 10,004 feet (3,049 m)
- Mount Morgan - 48°30′50″N 113°28′21″W: 8,704 feet (2,653 m)
- Mount Oberlin - 48°42′16″N 113°44′09″W; 8,064 feet (2,458 m)
- Mount Phillips - 48°28′40″N 113°31′30″W; 9,498 feet (2,895 m)
- Mount Pinchot - 48°29′44″N 113°35′42″W; 9,304 feet (2,836 m)
- Mount Rockwell - 48°26′36″N 113°27′04″W: 9,265 feet (2,824 m)
- Mount Saint Nicholas -48°23′30″N 113°33′01″W; 9,304 feet (2,836 m)
- Mount Siyeh - 48°43′45″N 113°38′59″W: 10,014 feet (3,052 m)
- Mount Stimson - 48°30′52″N 113°36′37″W; 10,142 feet (3,091 m)
- Mount Thompson - 48°32′45″N 113°41′16″W; 8,501 feet (2,591 m)
- Mount Wilbur - 48°48′20″N 113°44′21″W: 9,311 feet (2,838 m)

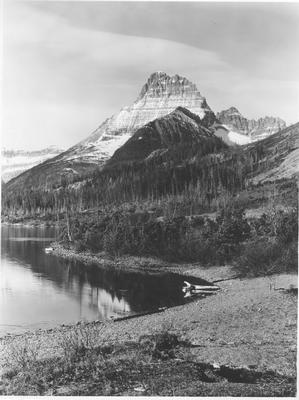
Mt. Wilbur and Lake McDermott, Glacier National Park, Montana. Photo by T. J. Hileman. Part of James Willard Schultz Photos and Personal Papers Collection, Montana State University.

- Natoas Peak - 48°52′29″N 113°45′47″W: 9,252 feet (2,820 m)
- Never Laughs Mountain - 48°26′44″N 113°22′54″W: 7,641 feet (2,329 m)
- Norris Mountain - 48°34′37″N 113°32′01″W: 8,911 feet (2,716 m)
- Peril Peak - 48°27′23″N 113°35′25″W; 8,651 feet (2,637 m)
- Piegan Mountain - 48°42′37″N 113°41′18″W: 9,039 feet (2,755 m)
- Pollock Mountain - 48°43′01″N 113°42′09″W: 9,167 feet (2,794 m)
- Pyramid Peak - 48°52′24″N 113°49′53″W: 8,159 feet (2,487 m)

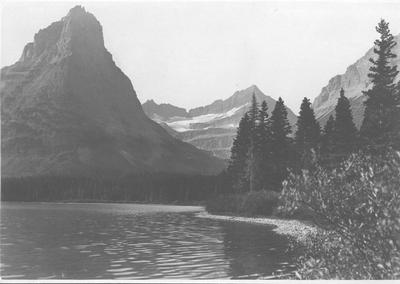
Black and white photo of Glenn Lake and Pyramid Peak, Glacier National Park, Montana. Photo by T. J. Hileman. Part of James Willard Schultz Photos and Personal Papers Collection, Montana State University.

- Razoredge Mountain - 48°33′24″N 113°30′58″W; 8,569 feet (2,612 m)
- Red Crow Mountain - 48°24′04″N 113°20′55″W: 7,871 feet (2,399 m)
- Red Eagle Mountain - 48°39′16″N 113°32′55″W: 8,763 feet (2,671 m)
- Red Mountain - 48°32′08″N 113°25′27″W: 9,370 feet (2,860 m)
- Reynolds Mountain - 48°40′19″N 113°43′24″W: 8,747 feet (2,666 m)
- Rising Wolf Mountain - 48°29′46″N 113°24′58″W: 9,491 feet (2,893 m)
- Salvage Mountain - 48°22′29″N 113°32′10″W; 8,225 feet (2,507 m)
- Sarcee Mountain - 48°59′19″N 113°47′16″W: 8,350 feet (2,550 m)
- Sentinel Mountain - 48°58′45″N 113°44′46″W: 8,245 feet (2,513 m)
- Seward Mountain - 48°52′15″N 113°40′50″W: 8,894 feet (2,711 m)
- Shaheeya Peak - 48°57′21″N 113°58′23″W: 8,022 feet (2,445 m)
- Sheep Mountain - 48°20′30″N 113°28′15″W; 8,530 feet (2,600 m)
- Sherburne Peak - 48°53′01″N 113°33′43″W: 8,478 feet (2,584 m)
- Sinopah Mountain - 48°27′48″N 113°24′44″W: 8,245 feet (2,513 m)
- Split Mountain - 48°35′53″N 113°32′21″W: 8,770 feet (2,670 m)
- Stoney Indian Peaks - 48°53′55″N 113°51′30″W: 8,861 feet (2,701 m)
- Summit Mountain - 48°21′14″N 113°22′11″W: 8,697 feet (2,651 m)
- Swiftcurrent Mountain - 48°47′09″N 113°46′00″W: 8,369 feet (2,551 m)
- Triple Divide Peak - 48°34′23″N 113°31′00″W: 8,020 feet (2,440 m)
- Tinkham Mountain -48°31′30″N 113°30′23″W; 8,254 feet (2,516 m)
- Vigil Peak - 48°24′57″N 113°29′03″W; 8,527 feet (2,599 m)
- Wahcheechee Mountain - 48°52′59″N 113°52′28″W: 8,419 feet (2,566 m)
- Walton Mountain - 48°34′32″N 113°43′58″W; 8,917 feet (2,718 m)
- White Calf Mountain - 48°38′40″N 113°24′27″W: 8,855 feet (2,699 m)
- Wolftail Mountain - 48°26′26″N 113°36′38″W; 8,176 feet (2,492 m)
- Wynn Mountain - 48°46′33″N 113°35′55″W: 8,396 feet (2,559 m)
- Yellow Mountain - 48°52′54″N 113°38′15″W: 8,756 feet (2,669 m)

== Livingston Range ==
The Livingston Range traverses the park in a generally north to south direction in the northwestern portions of the park.

- Anaconda Peak - 48°46′06″N 113°58′24″W; 8,166 feet (2,489 m)
- Boulder Peak - 48°57′20″N 114°05′28″W; 8,527 feet (2,599 m)
- Campbell Mountain - 48°58′41″N 113°56′19″W: 8,209 feet (2,502 m)
- Chapman Peak - 48°57′47″N 114°01′26″W; 9,321 feet (2,841 m)
- Gardner Point - 48°58′37″N 114°07′40″W; 7,405 feet (2,257 m)
- Heavens Peak - 48°42′32″N 113°51′22″W; 8,848 feet (2,697 m)
- Kinnerly Peak - 48°57′22″N 114°09′55″W; 9,947 feet (3,032 m)
- Kintla Peak - 48°56′38″N 114°10′16″W; 10,101 feet (3,079 m)
- Logging Mountain - 48°48′21″N 114°02′49″W; 8,540 feet (2,600 m)
- Longfellow Peak -48°44′44″N 113°56′21″W; 8,855 feet (2,699 m)
- McPartland Mountain - 48°41′26″N 113°51′49″W; 8,159 feet (2,487 m)
- Mount Carter - 48°53′32″N 114°04′39″W; 9,829 feet (2,996 m)
- Mount Custer - 48°58′49″N 114°03′29″W; 8,802 feet (2,683 m)
- Mount Geduhn -48°47′48″N 113°58′12″W; 8,350 feet (2,550 m)
- Mount Peabody - 48°55′47″N 114°08′26″W; 9,098 feet (2,773 m)
- Mount Vaught - 48°40′51″N 113°52′26″W; 8,789 feet (2,679 m)
- Nahsukin Mountain - 48°50′28″N 113°59′22″W: 8,172 feet (2,491 m)
- Numa Peak - 48°54′12″N 114°09′40″W; 8,917 feet (2,718 m)
- Olson Mountain - 48°57′26″N 113°56′15″W; 7,913 feet (2,412 m)
- Parke Peak - 48°56′44″N 114°14′21″W; 8,940 feet (2,720 m)
- Paul Bunyans Cabin - 48°44′28″N 113°56′12″W; 8,432 feet (2,570 m)
- Rainbow Peak - 48°52′45″N 114°05′49″W; 9,803 feet (2,988 m)
- Redhorn Peak - 48°51′54″N 114°00′23″W; 8,113 feet (2,473 m)
- Reuter Peak - 48°54′42″N 114°12′06″W; 8,750 feet (2,670 m)
- Shaheeya Peak - 8,022 feet (2,445 m)
- Square Peak - 48°52′00″N 114°06′16″W; 8,606 feet (2,623 m)
- The Guardhouse - 48°54′57″N 114°01′00″W; 9,331 feet (2,844 m)
- Thunderbird Mountain - 48°56′01″N 114°02′45″W: 8,625 feet (2,629 m)
- Vulture Peak (Montana) - 48°50′14″N 114°01′26″W; 9,616 feet (2,931 m)
