= Eagle Plume Mountain =

Mountain in the state of Montana, US

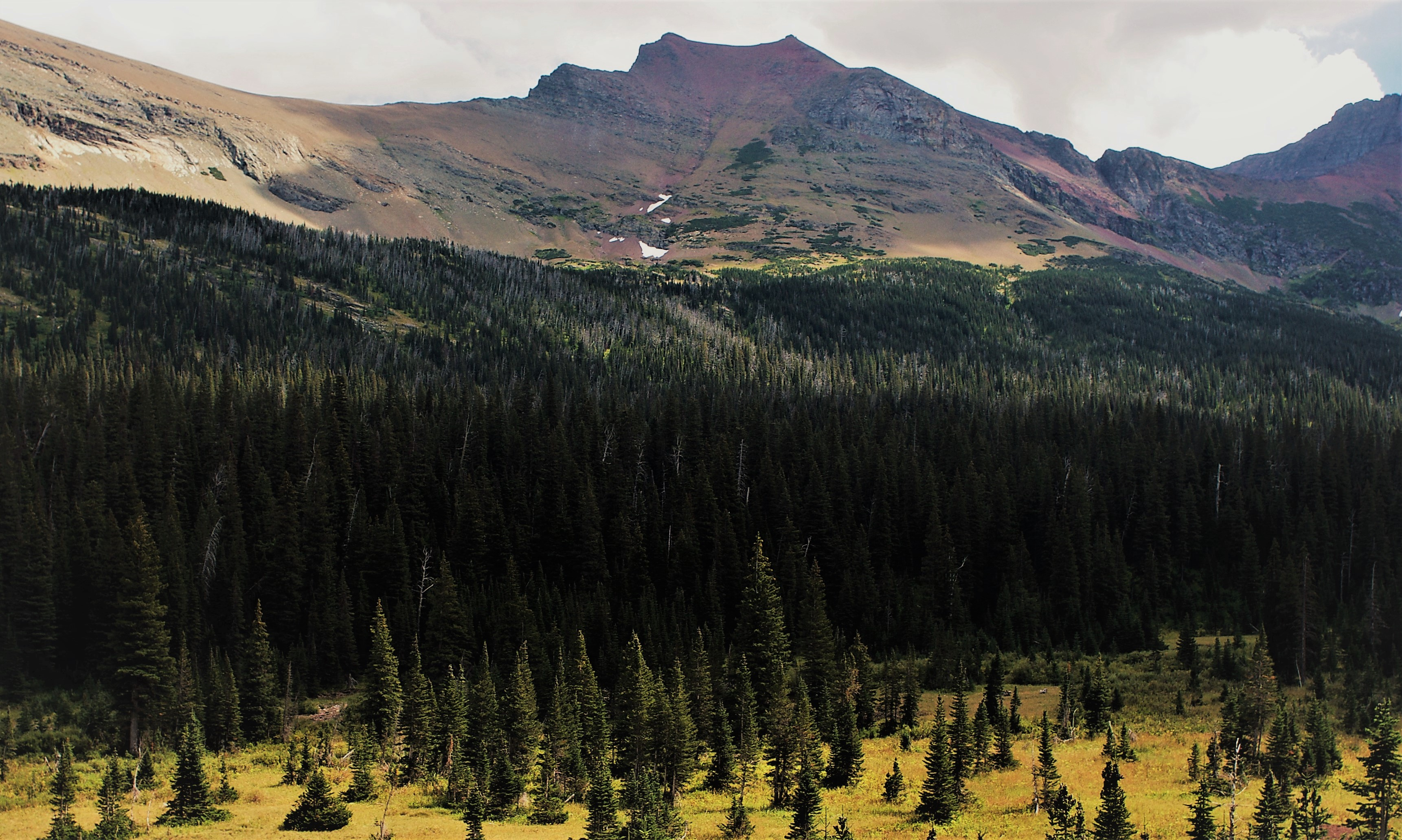
- Northwest aspect

Highest point
- Elevation: 8,724 ft (2,659 m)
- Prominence: 944 ft (288 m)
- Coordinates: 48°33′10″N 113°25′04″W

Geography
- Location within Montana Location within the United States
- Location: Glacier County, Montana, U.S.
- Parent range: Lewis Range
- Topo map(s): USGS Cut Bank Pass, MT

Climbing
- First ascent: Unknown

Eagle Plume Mountain (8,724 ft (2,659 m)) is located in the Lewis Range, Glacier National Park in the U.S. state of Montana. Eagle Plume Mountain is connected by a gently sloping ridge to Mad Wolf Mountain to the north.

== See also ==
- Mountains and mountain ranges of Glacier National Park (U.S.)
