= Brave Dog Mountain =

Mountain in the American state of Montana

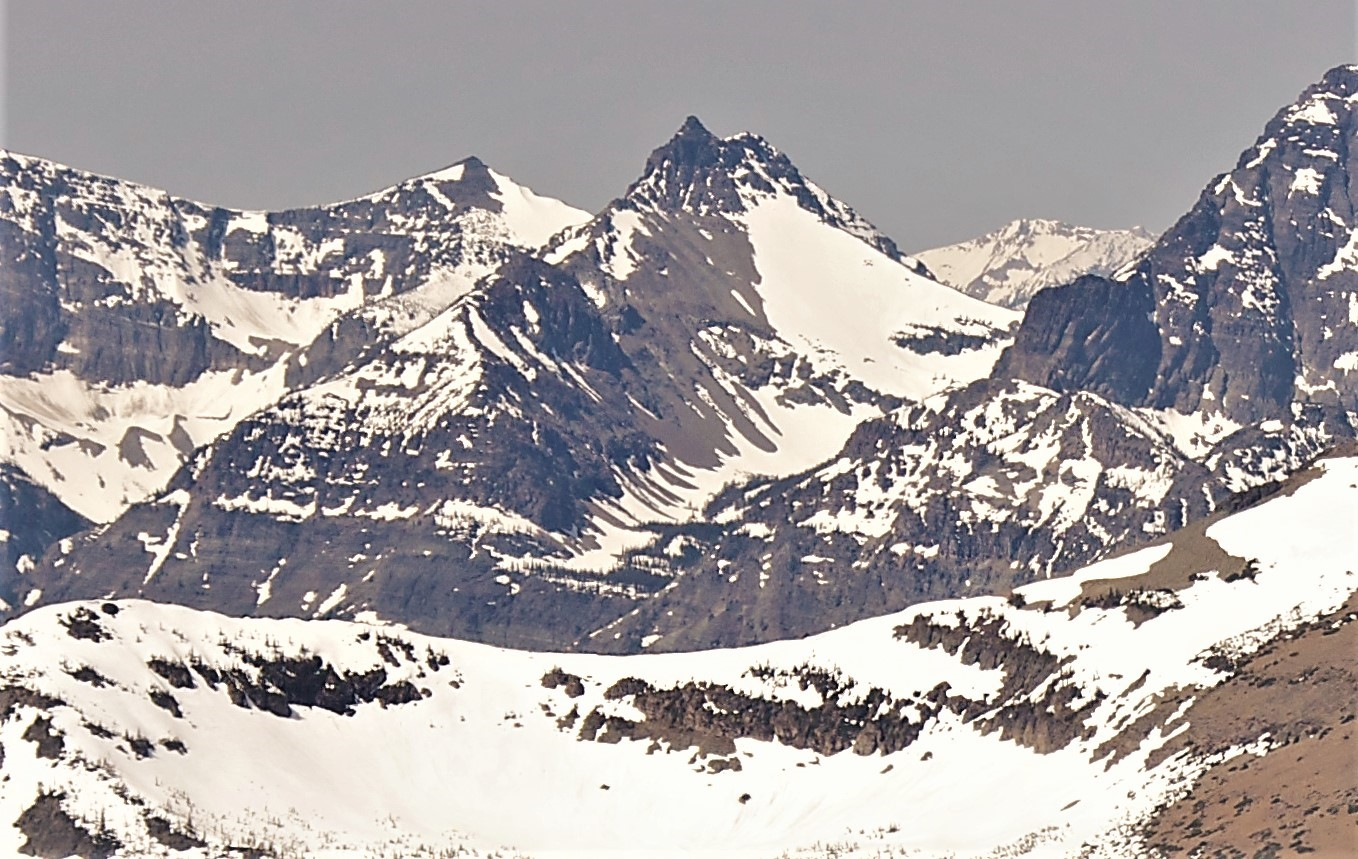
- Brave Dog Mountain, northeast aspect

Highest point
- Elevation: 8,500 ft (2,600 m) NAVD 88
- Prominence: 780 ft (240 m)
- Coordinates: 48°21′32″N 113°27′40″W

Geography
- Location within Montana Location within the United States
- Location: Flathead County, Montana, U.S.
- Parent range: Lewis Range
- Topo map(s): USGS Blacktail, MT

Brave Dog Mountain (8,468 feet (2,581 m)) is located in the Lewis Range, Glacier National Park in the U.S. state of Montana.

== See also ==
- Mountains and mountain ranges of Glacier National Park (U.S.)
