= White Calf Mountain =

Mountain in the state of Montana

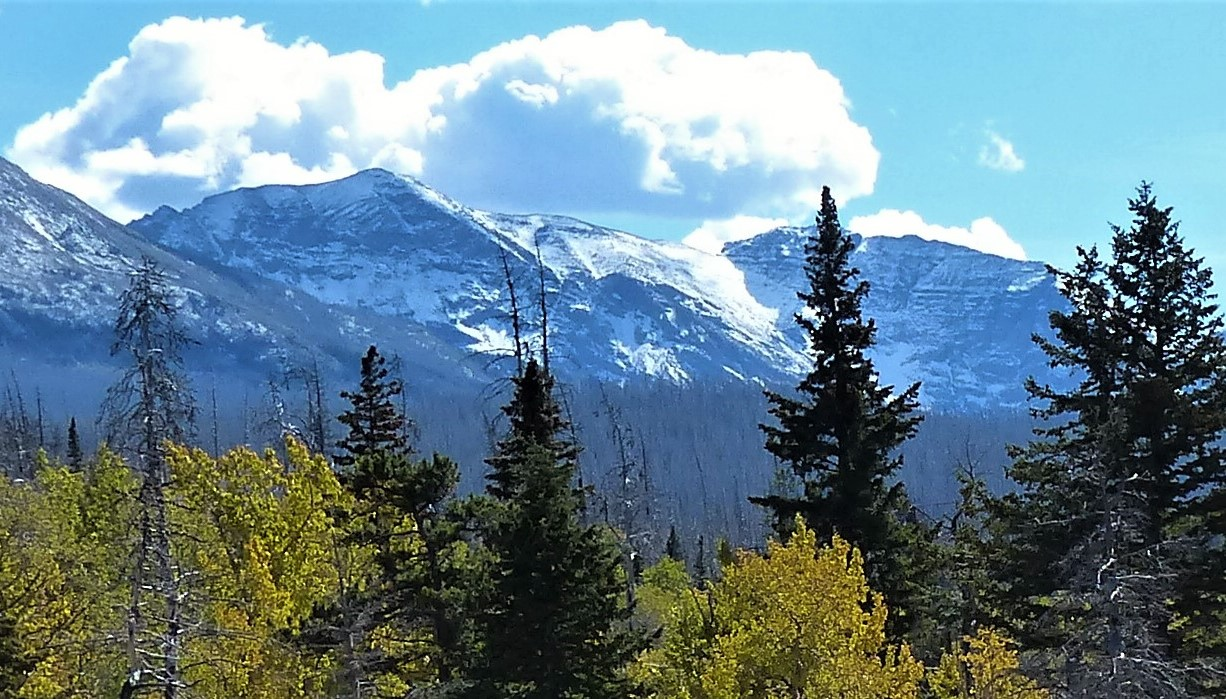
- North aspect

Highest point
- Elevation: 8,898 ft (2,712 m)
- Prominence: 973 ft (297 m)
- Coordinates: 48°38′40″N 113°24′27″W

Geography
- Location within Montana
- Location: Glacier County, Montana, U.S.
- Parent range: Lewis Range
- Topo map(s): USGS Saint Mary, MT

White Calf Mountain (8,898 feet (2,712 m)) is located in the Lewis Range, Glacier National Park in the U.S. state of Montana. White Calf Mountain is south of Divide Mountain and just west of the Blackfeet Indian Reservation boundary.

== See also ==
- Mountains and mountain ranges of Glacier National Park (U.S.)
