= Peril Peak =

Mountain in the American state of Montana

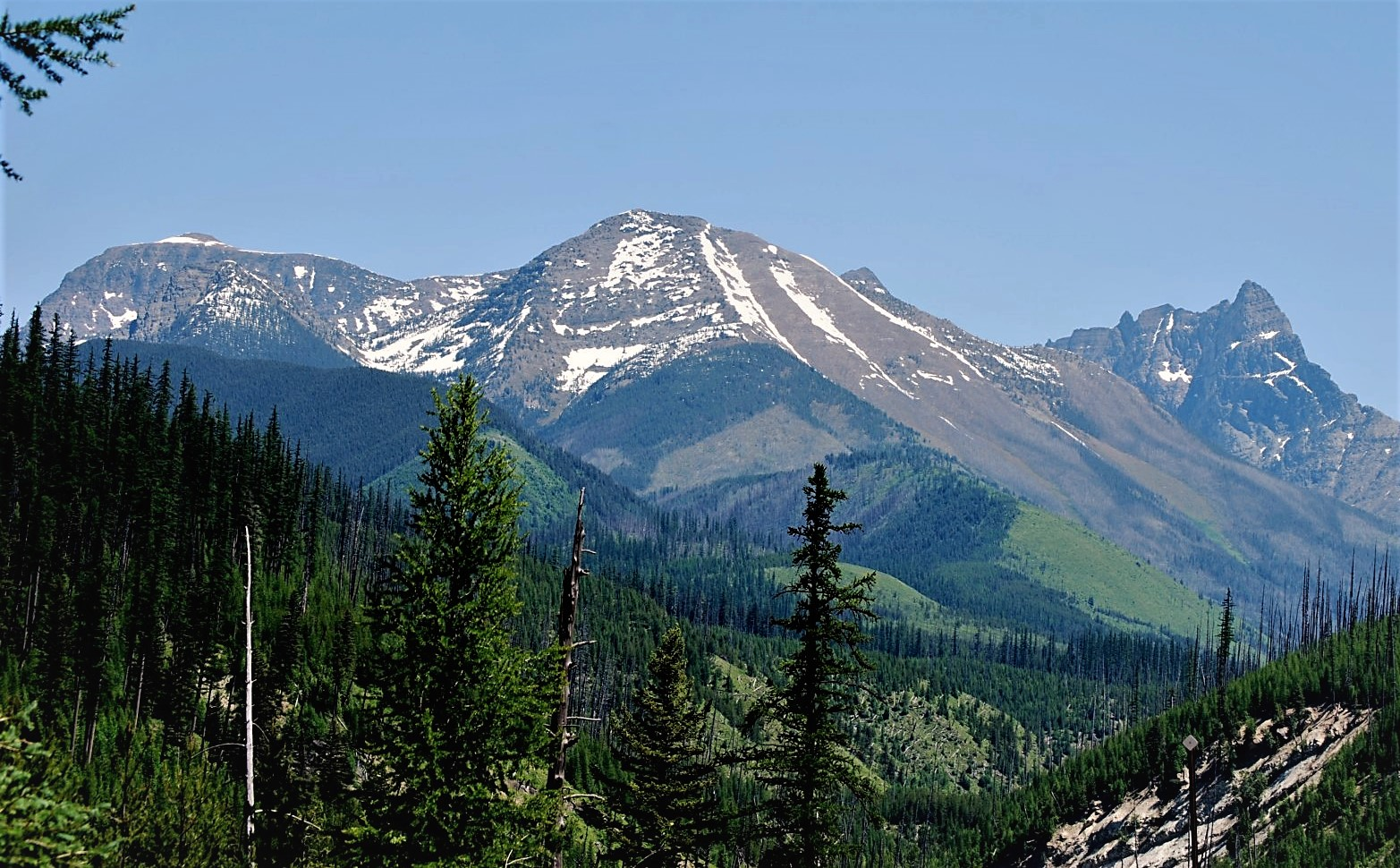
- Peril Peak to left, from west. (Wolftail Mountain centered, Mount Doody to right)

Highest point
- Elevation: 8,645 ft (2,635 m) NAVD 88
- Prominence: 1,005 ft (306 m)
- Coordinates: 48°27′23″N 113°35′25″W

Geography
- Location within Montana Location within the United States
- Location: Flathead County, Montana, U.S.
- Parent range: Lewis Range
- Topo map(s): USGS Mount Saint Nicholas, MT

Climbing
- Easiest route: class 3

Peril Peak (8,645 feet (2,635 m)) is located in the Lewis Range, Glacier National Park in the U.S. state of Montana.

== See also ==
- Mountains and mountain ranges of Glacier National Park (U.S.)
