= Mount Despair (Montana) =

Mountain in Montana, United States

- Location within Montana Location within the United States

Highest point
- Elevation: 8,587 ft (2,617 m) NAVD 88
- Prominence: 1,148 ft (350 m)
- Coordinates: 48°23′56″N 113°25′54″W

Geography
- Location: Flathead County, Montana, U.S.
- Parent range: Lewis Range
- Topo map(s): USGS Mount Rockwell, MT

Mount Despair (8,587 feet (2,617 m)) is located in the Lewis Range, Glacier National Park in the U.S. state of Montana.

== See also ==
- Mountains and mountain ranges of Glacier National Park (U.S.)
