= Cloudcroft Peaks =

Mountain in Montana, United States

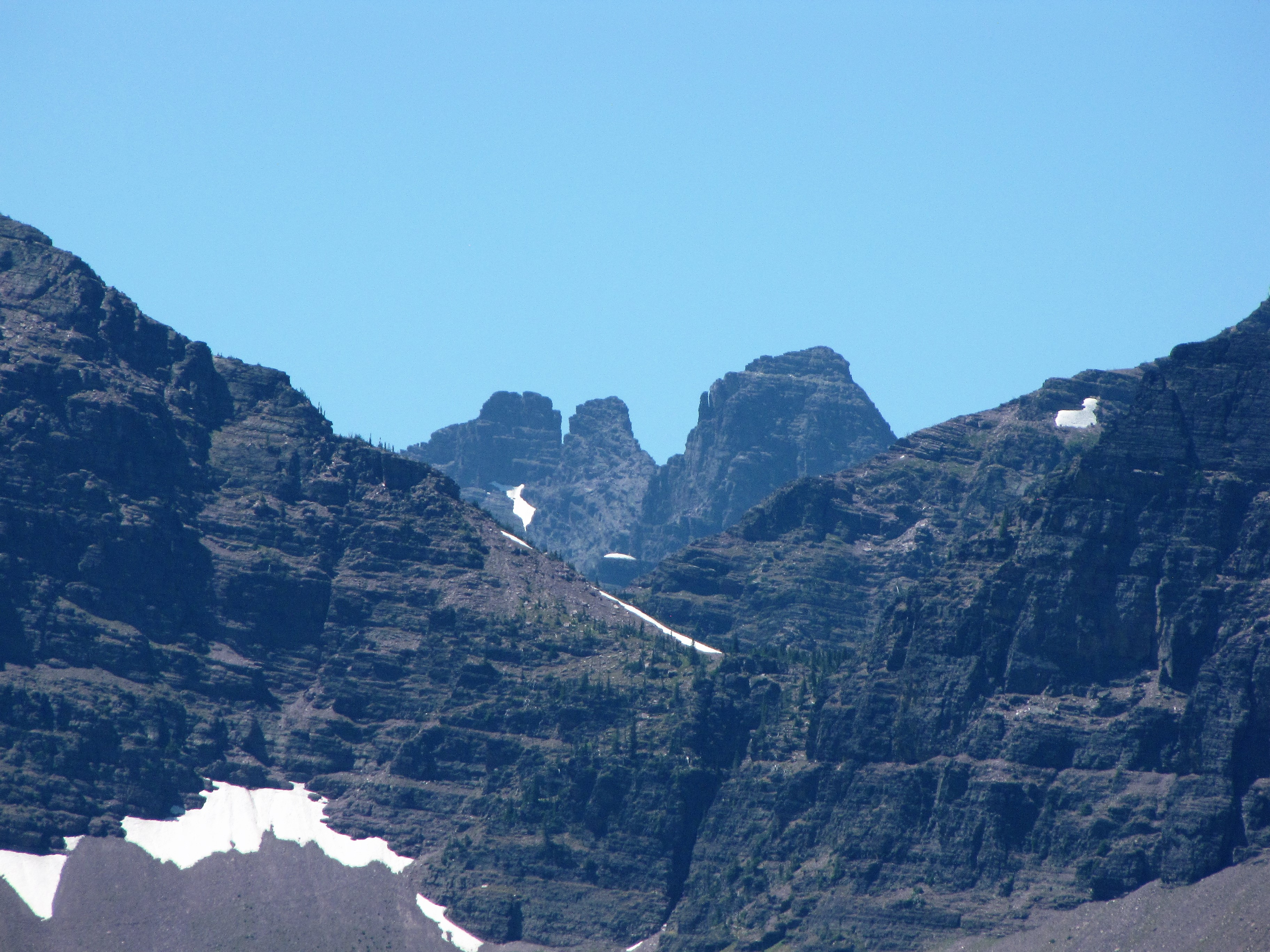
- Apex of distant Cloudcroft Peaks as seen from Two Medicine

Highest point
- Elevation: 8,714 ft (2,656 m)
- Prominence: 1,270 ft (390 m)
- Coordinates: 48°26′02″N 113°34′08″W

Geography
- Location within Montana Location within the United States
- Location: Flathead County, Montana, U.S.
- Parent range: Lewis Range
- Topo map(s): USGS Mount Saint Nicholas, MT

Cloudcroft Peaks (8,714 feet (2,656 m)) is located in the Lewis Range, Glacier National Park in the U.S. state of Montana.

== Climate ==
Cloudcroft Peaks is located in an alpine subarctic climate zone characterized by long, usually very cold winters, and short, cool to mild summers. Winter temperatures can drop below −10 °F with wind chill factors below −30 °F.

== Geology ==
Like the other mountains in Glacier National Park, Cloudcroft Peaks is composed of sedimentary rock laid down during the Precambrian to Jurassic periods. Formed in shallow seas, this sedimentary rock was initially uplifted beginning 170 million years ago when the Lewis Overthrust fault pushed an enormous slab of precambrian rocks 3 mi (4.8 km) thick, 50 miles (80 km) wide and 160 miles (260 km) long over younger rock of the cretaceous period.

== Gallery ==
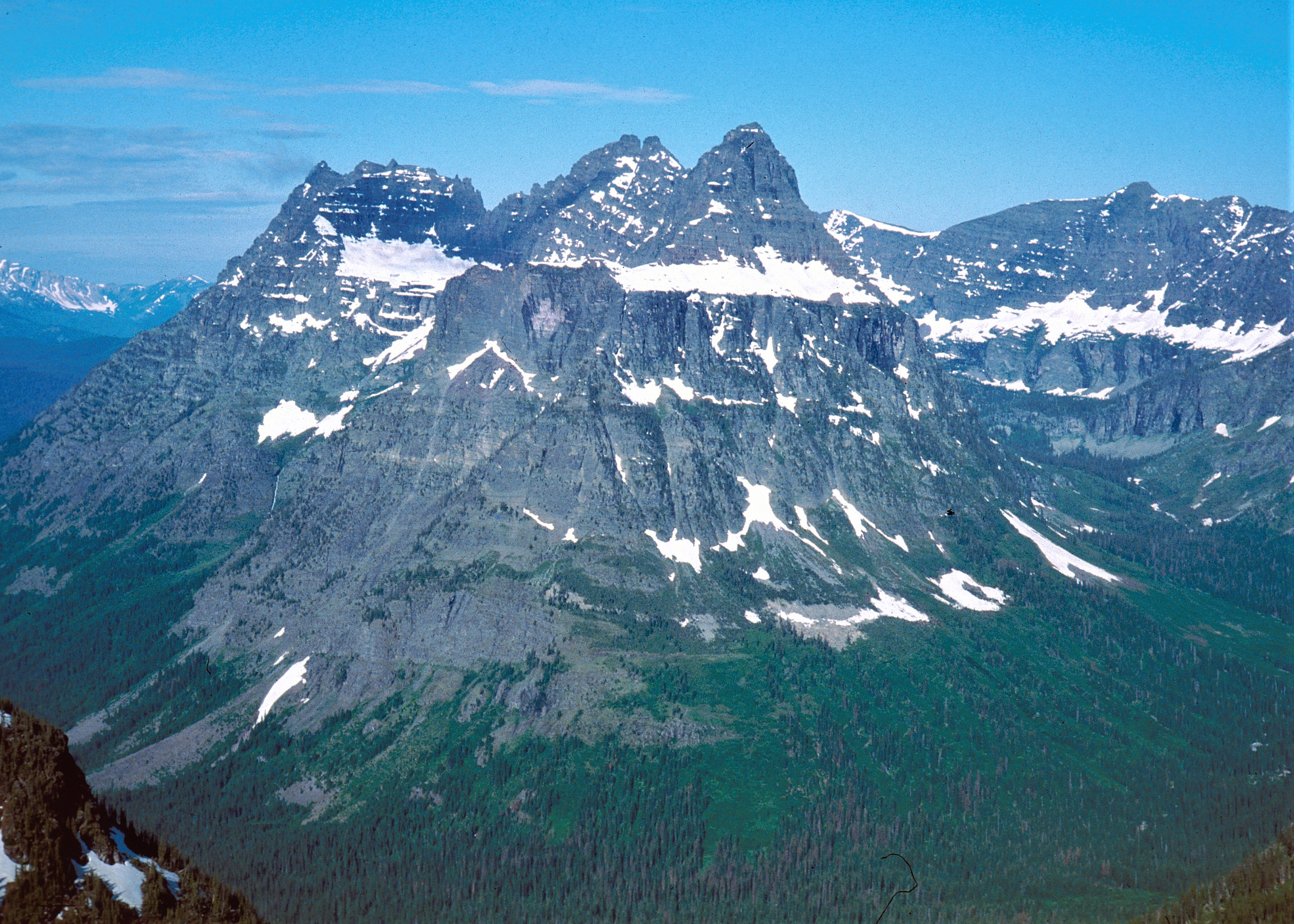
East aspect

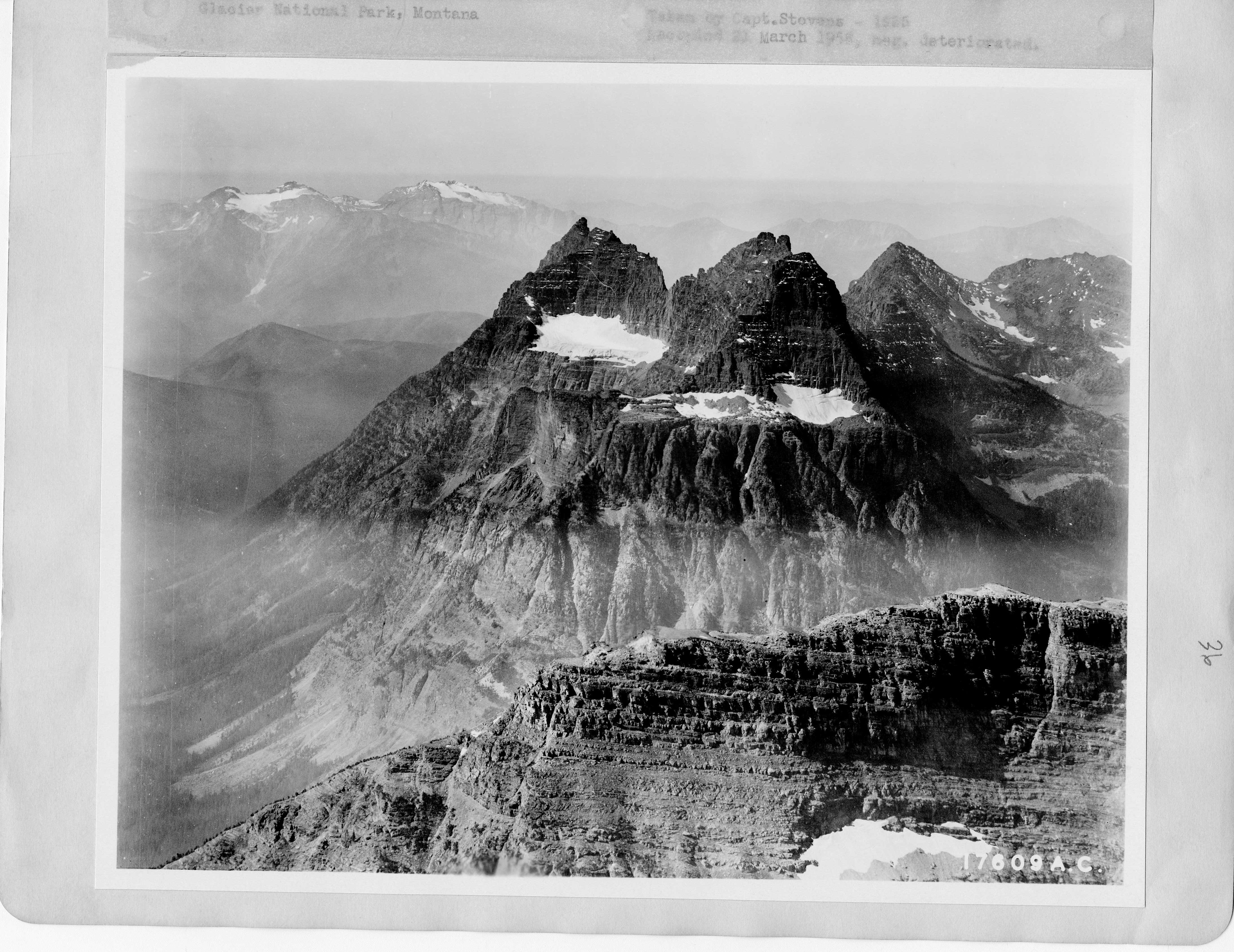
Aerial view, circa 1925

== See also ==
- Mountains and mountain ranges of Glacier National Park (U.S.)
