= Redrock Lake =

Lake in the American state of Montana

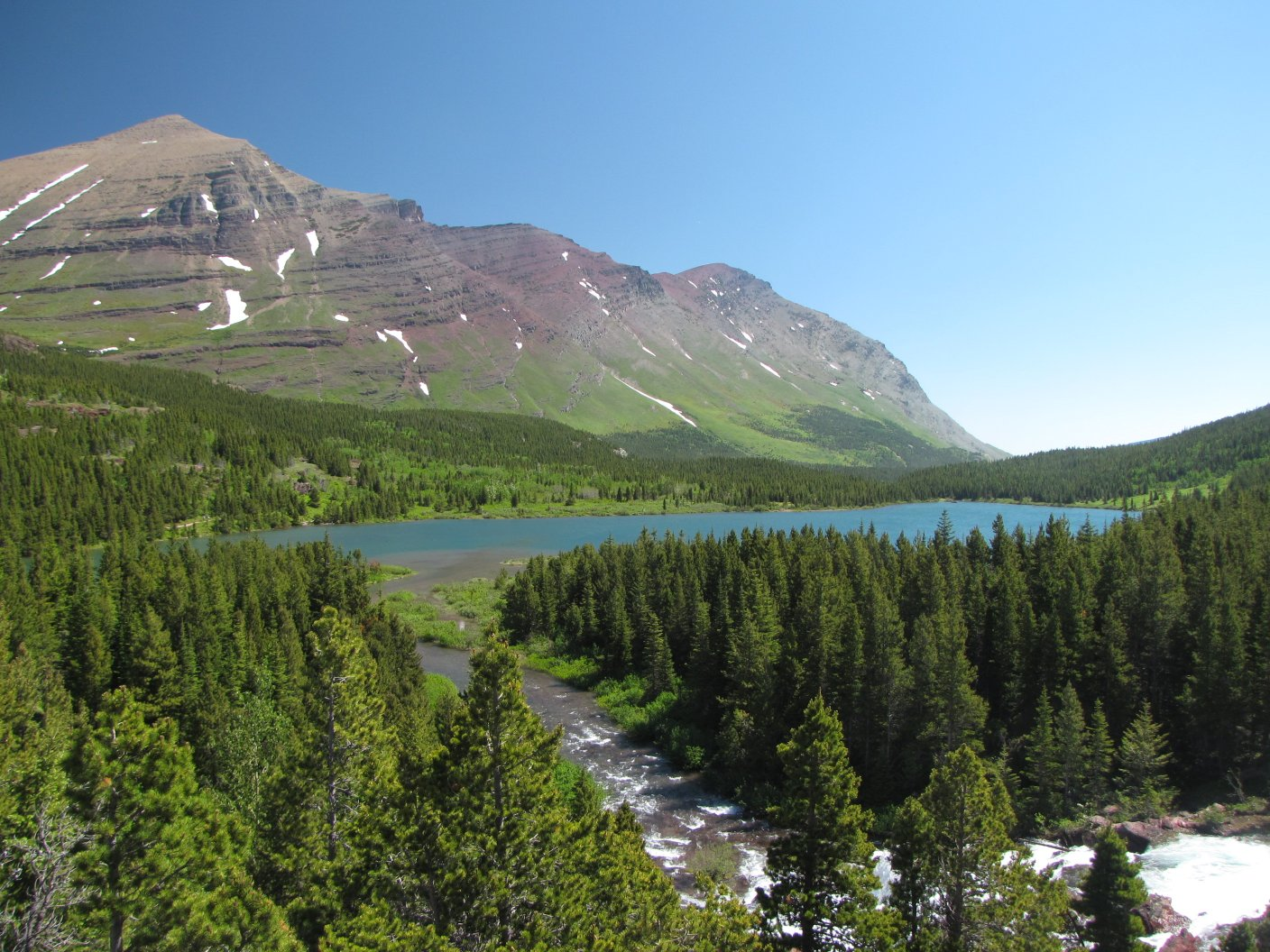
- Redrock Lake, from above Redrock Falls looking towards Mount Henkel and Altyn Peak.

- Location within Montana Location within the United States
- Location: Glacier National Park, Glacier County, Montana, US
- Coordinates: 48°47′45″N 113°42′22″W
- Type: Natural
- Primary inflows: Swiftcurrent Creek
- Primary outflows: Swiftcurrent Creek
- Basin countries: United States
- Max. length: .35 miles (0.56 km)
- Max. width: .20 miles (0.32 km)
- Surface elevation: 5,082 ft (1,549 m)

Redrock Lake is located in Glacier National Park in the U. S. state of Montana. Mount Wilbur is west of Redrock Lake. Prior to entering Redrock Lake, Swiftcurrent Creek tumbles over Redrock Falls, which can be reached after an easy 1.8 miles (2.9 km) hike by way of the Swiftcurrent Pass Trail.

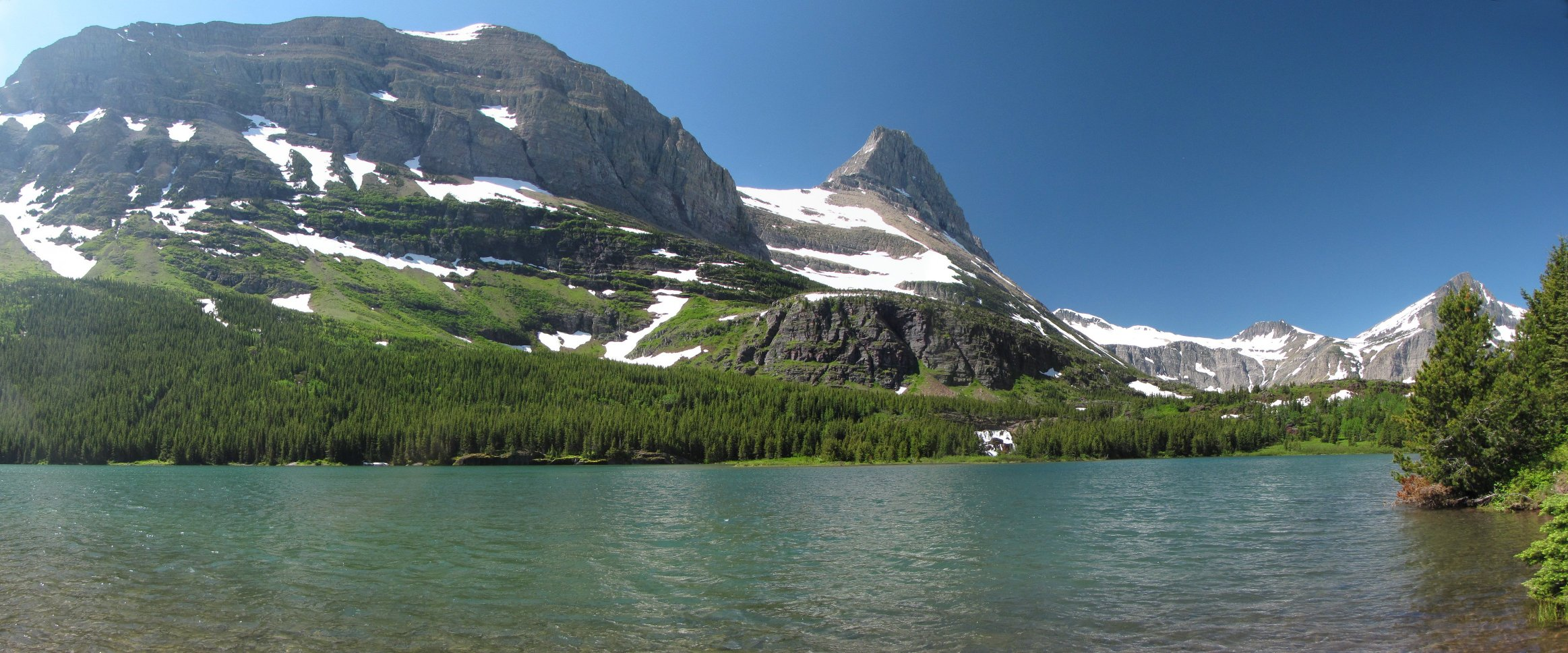
Redrock Lake with Mount Grinnell.

== See also ==
- List of lakes in Glacier County, Montana
