= Iceberg Peak (Montana) =

Mountain in Montana, USA

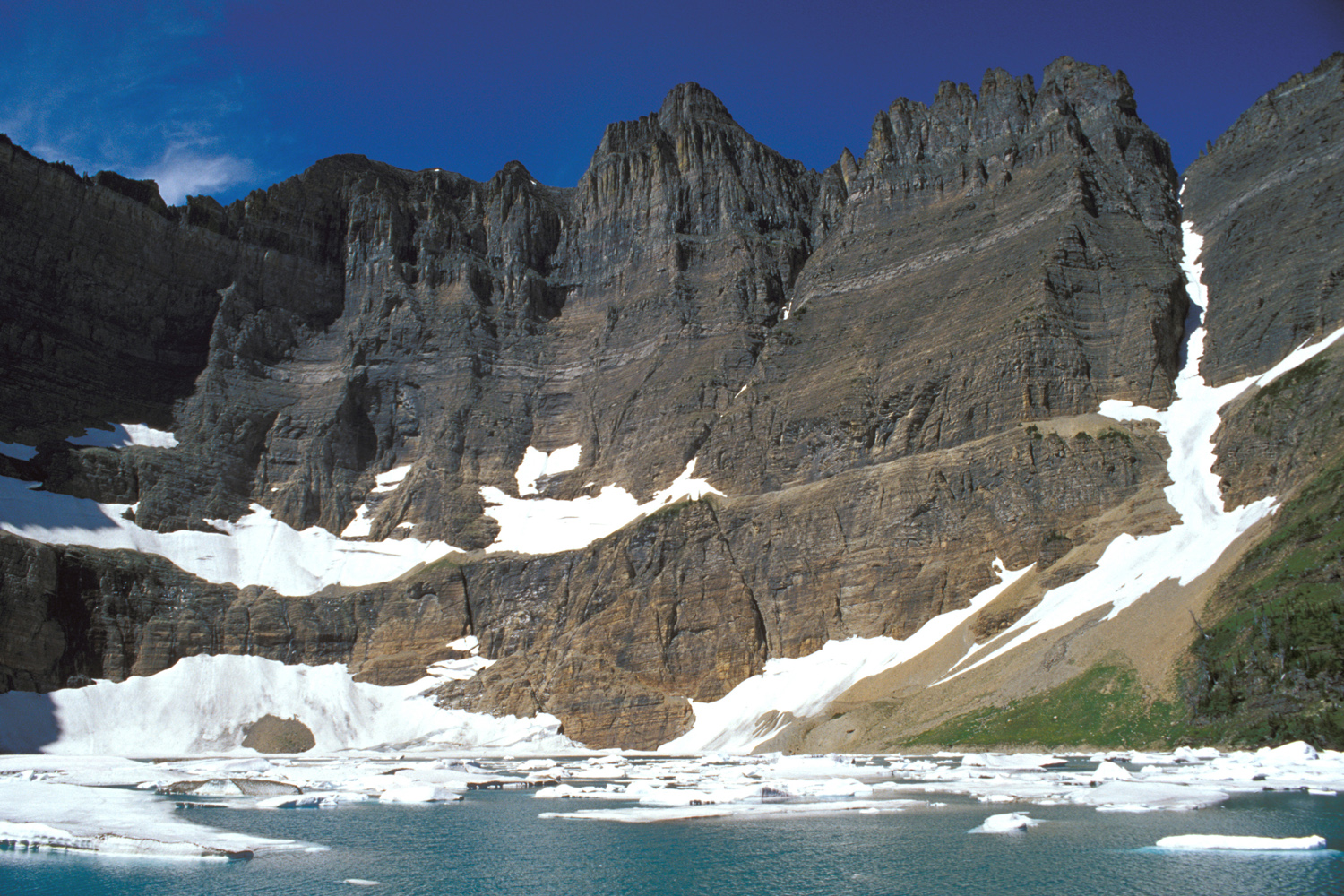
- Iceberg Peak above Iceberg lake

Highest point
- Elevation: 9,149 ft (2,789 m)
- Prominence: 905 ft (276 m)
- Coordinates: 48°48′52″N 113°45′36″W

Geography
- Location within Montana Location within the United States
- Location: Glacier National Park; Glacier County / Flathead County; Montana, U.S.
- Parent range: Lewis Range
- Topo map: USGS Ahern Pass

Climbing
- Easiest route: class 3-4

Iceberg Peak (9,149 feet (2,789 m)) is located in the Lewis Range, Glacier National Park in the U.S. state of Montana. Iceberg Peak rises more than 3,000 feet (910 m) above Iceberg Lake and is considered a difficult climb due to the steepness and exposure climbers must endure. The peak sits astride the continental divide 1.1 mi (1.8 km) WNW of Mount Wilbur.

== Climate ==
Based on the Köppen climate classification, the peak is located in an alpine subarctic climate zone with long, cold, snowy winters, and cool to warm summers. Temperatures can drop below −10 °F with wind chill factors below −30 °F.

== Geology ==
Like other mountains in Glacier National Park, the peak is composed of sedimentary rock laid down during the Precambrian to Jurassic periods. Formed in shallow seas, this sedimentary rock was initially uplifted beginning 170 million years ago when the Lewis Overthrust fault pushed an enormous slab of precambrian rocks 3 mi (4.8 km) thick, 50 miles (80 km) wide and 160 miles (260 km) long over younger rock of the cretaceous period.

== Gallery ==
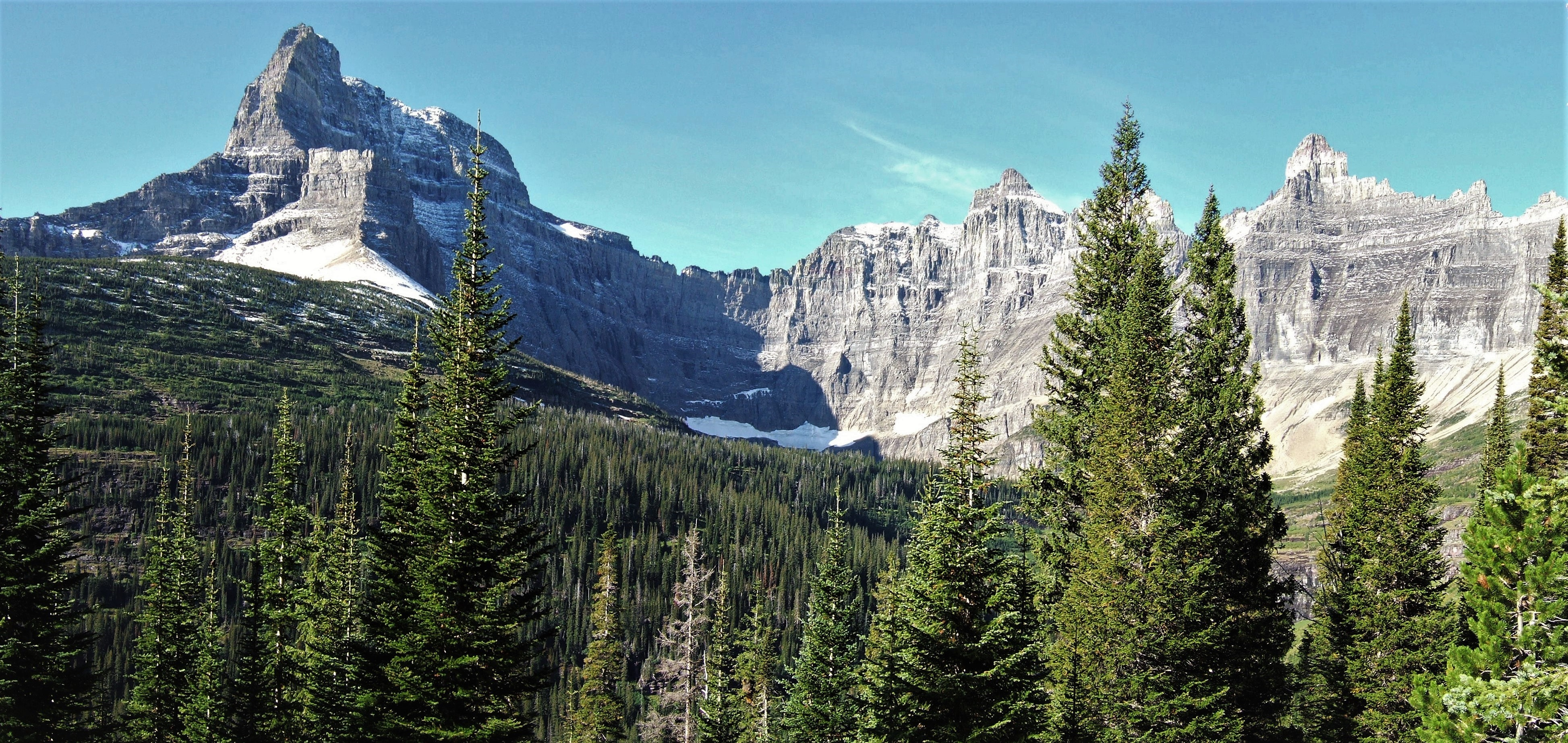
Mount Wilbur (left), Iceberg Peak, B-7 Pillar (right)

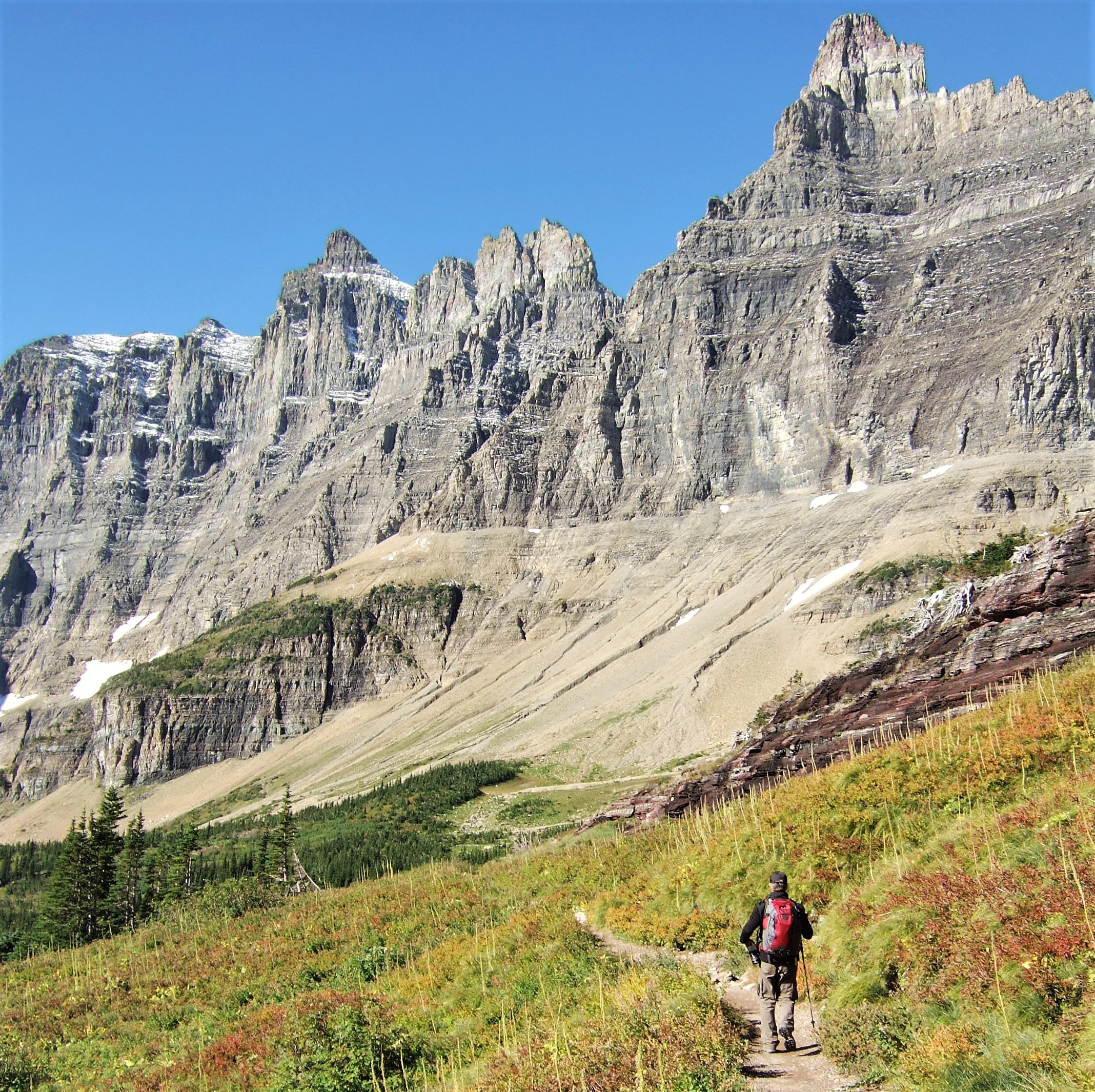
Iceberg Lake Trail with Iceberg Peak (left) and B-7 Pillar (right)

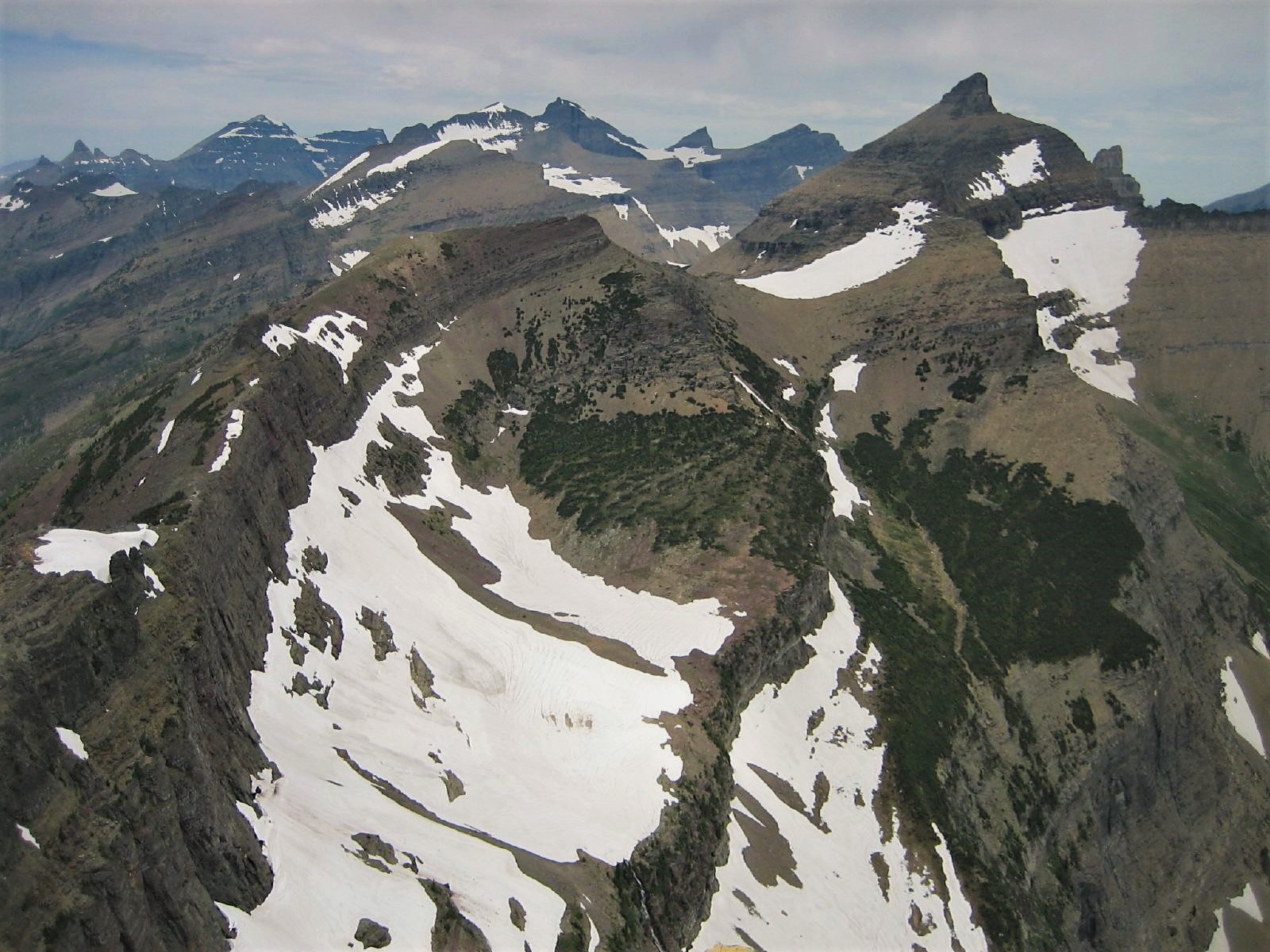
Iceberg Peak's south aspect in upper right, seen from Swiftcurrent Mountain.

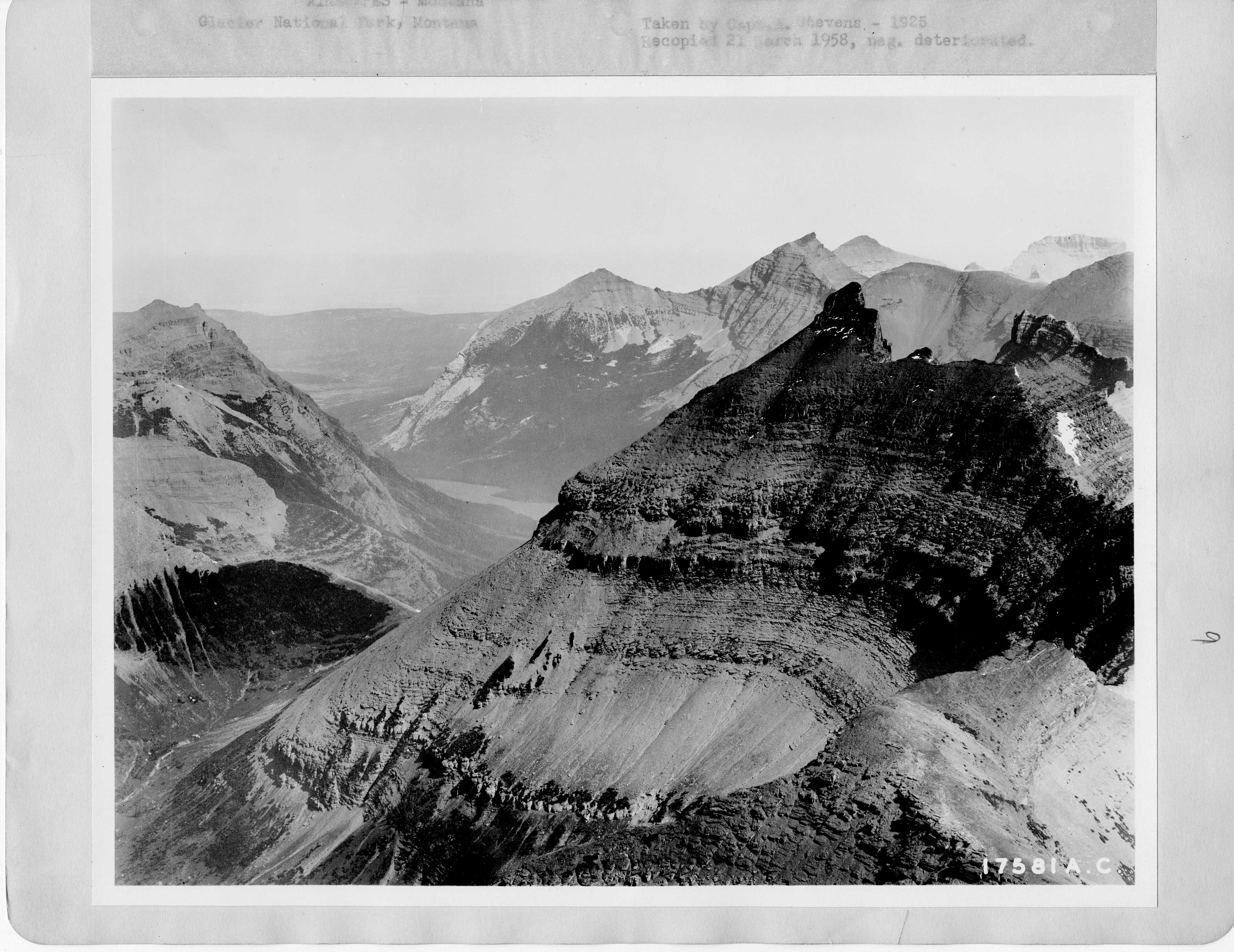
Iceberg Peak (right), aerial view circa 1925.

== See also ==
- Mountains and mountain ranges of Glacier National Park (U.S.)
