= Bullhead Lake (Glacier County, Montana) =

Lake in Montana, United States

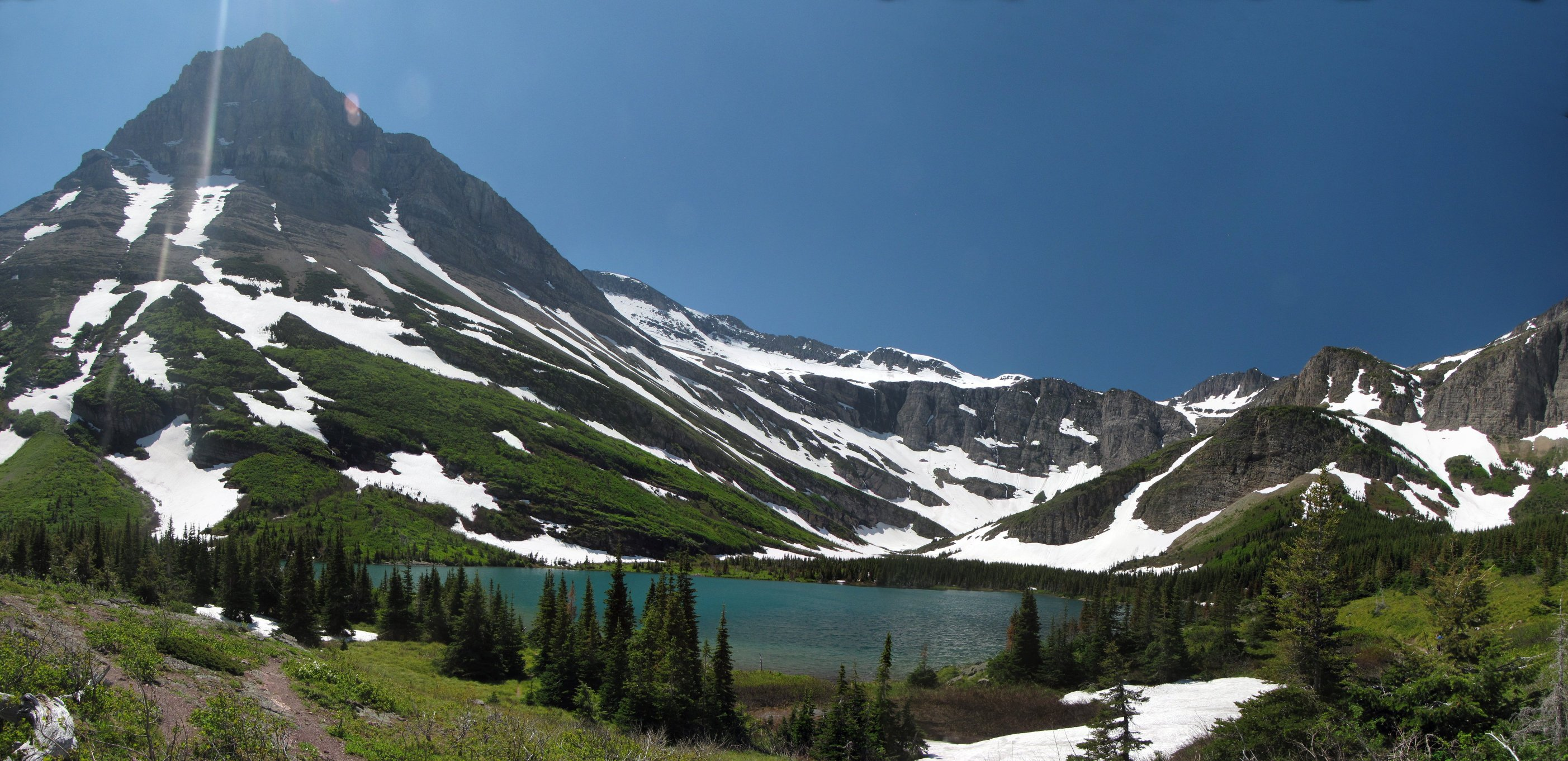
- Bullhead Lake, looking towards Mount Grinnell

- Location within Montana Location within the United States
- Location: Glacier National Park, Glacier County, Montana, US
- Coordinates: 48°47′10″N 113°44′04″W,
- Lake type: Natural
- Primary outflows: Swiftcurrent Creek
- Basin countries: United States
- Surface elevation: 5,184 ft (1,580 m)

Bullhead Lake is located in Glacier National Park, in the U. S. state of Montana. Mount Wilbur is North of Bullhead Lake.

Surroundings

== See also ==
- List of lakes in Glacier County, Montana
