= Iceberg Cirque =

Cirque in Montana, United States

Coordinates: 48.8061°N 113.7452°W

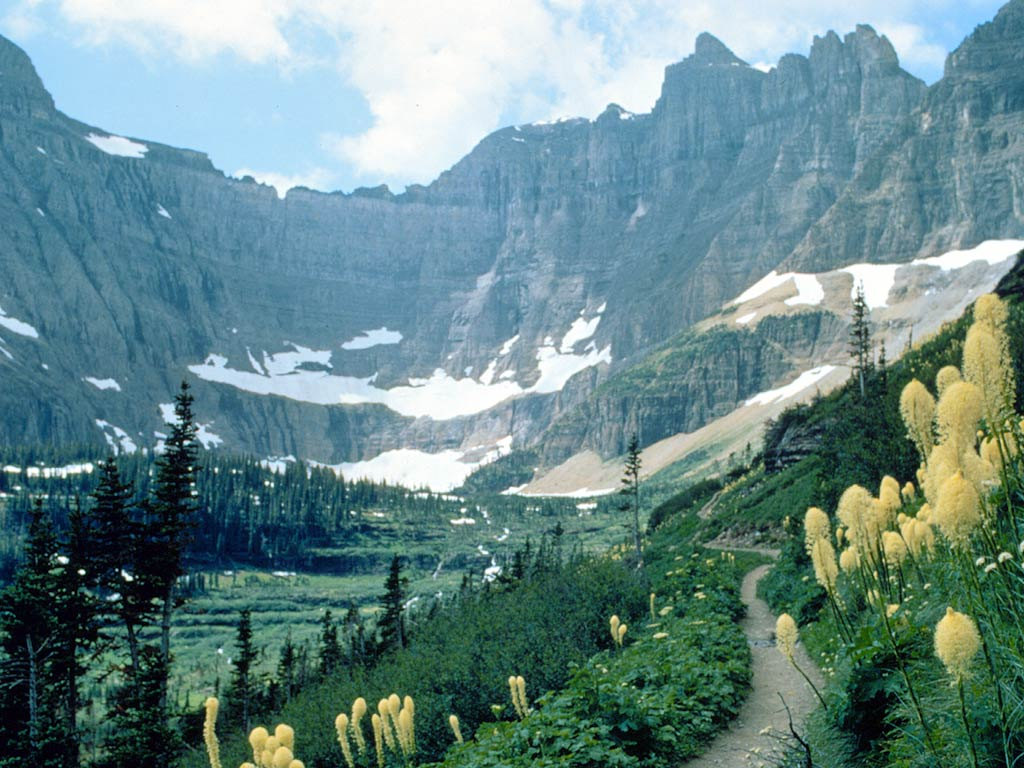
Iceberg Cirque

The Iceberg Cirque is a large cirque that has been carved out by glaciation. It is located in Glacier National Park in the U.S. state of Montana. It is near Iceberg Lake in the Many Glacier section of the park, and can be approached by a hike starting at the Many Glacier Hotel.
