= Mount Grinnell =

Mountain in the state of Montana

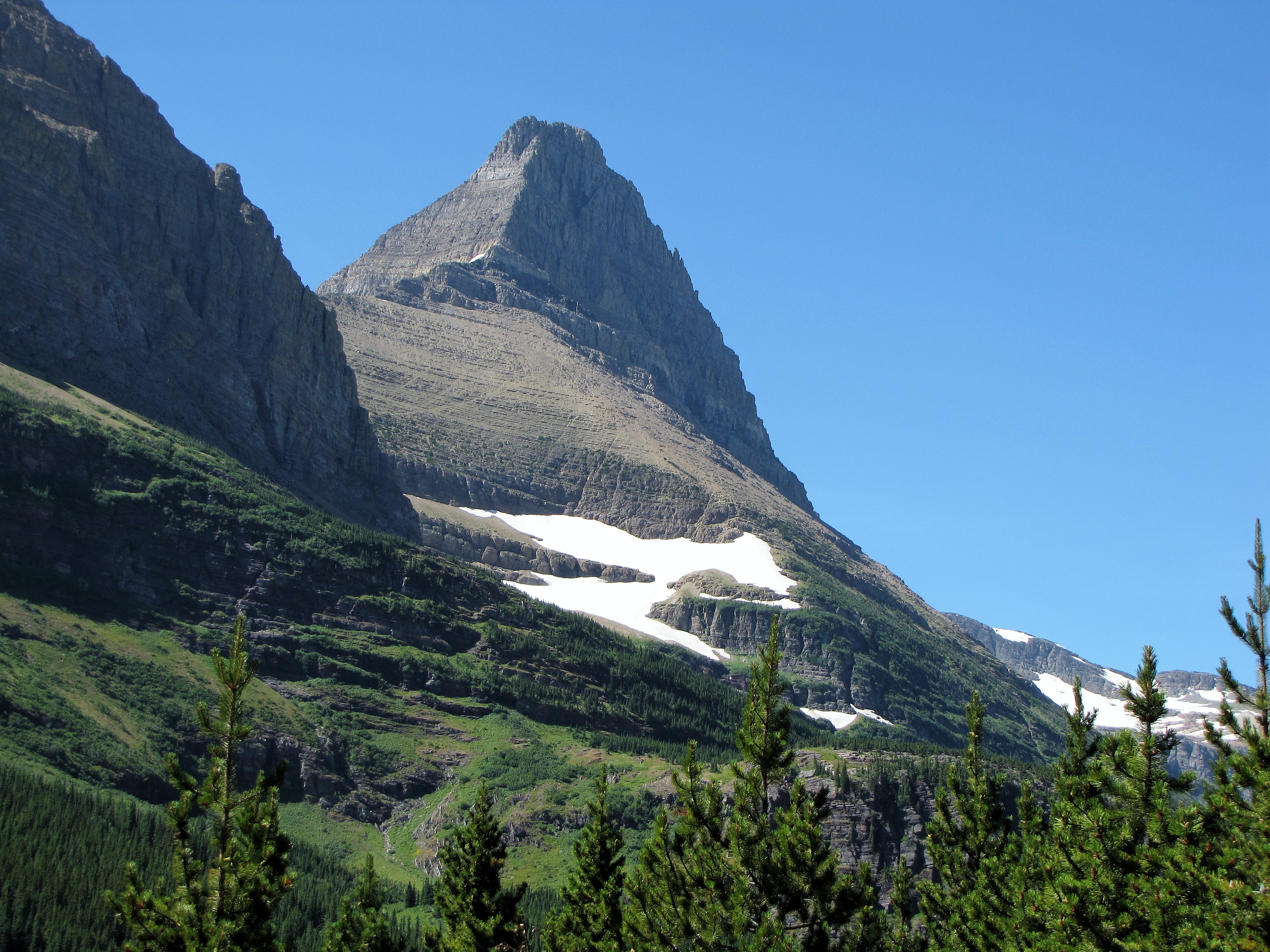
- Mount Grinnell

Highest point
- Elevation: 8,855 ft (2,699 m) NAVD 88
- Prominence: 406 m (1,332 ft)
- Coordinates: 48°46′36″N 113°43′37″W

Geography
- Location within Montana
- Location: Glacier National Park, Glacier County, Montana, U.S.
- Parent range: Lewis Range
- Topo map: USGS Many Glacier

Climbing
- Easiest route: Scramble

Mount Grinnell is a peak located in the heart of Glacier National Park in the U.S. state of Montana. Lying just east of the Continental Divide in the Many Glacier region of the park, the peak is flanked to the northwest by Swiftcurrent Glacier and to the south by Grinnell Glacier. Mount Grinnell is named after George Bird Grinnell. From the Many Glacier Hotel on Swiftcurrent Lake, the eastern arm of Mount Grinnell, known as Grinnell Point, hides the main summit.

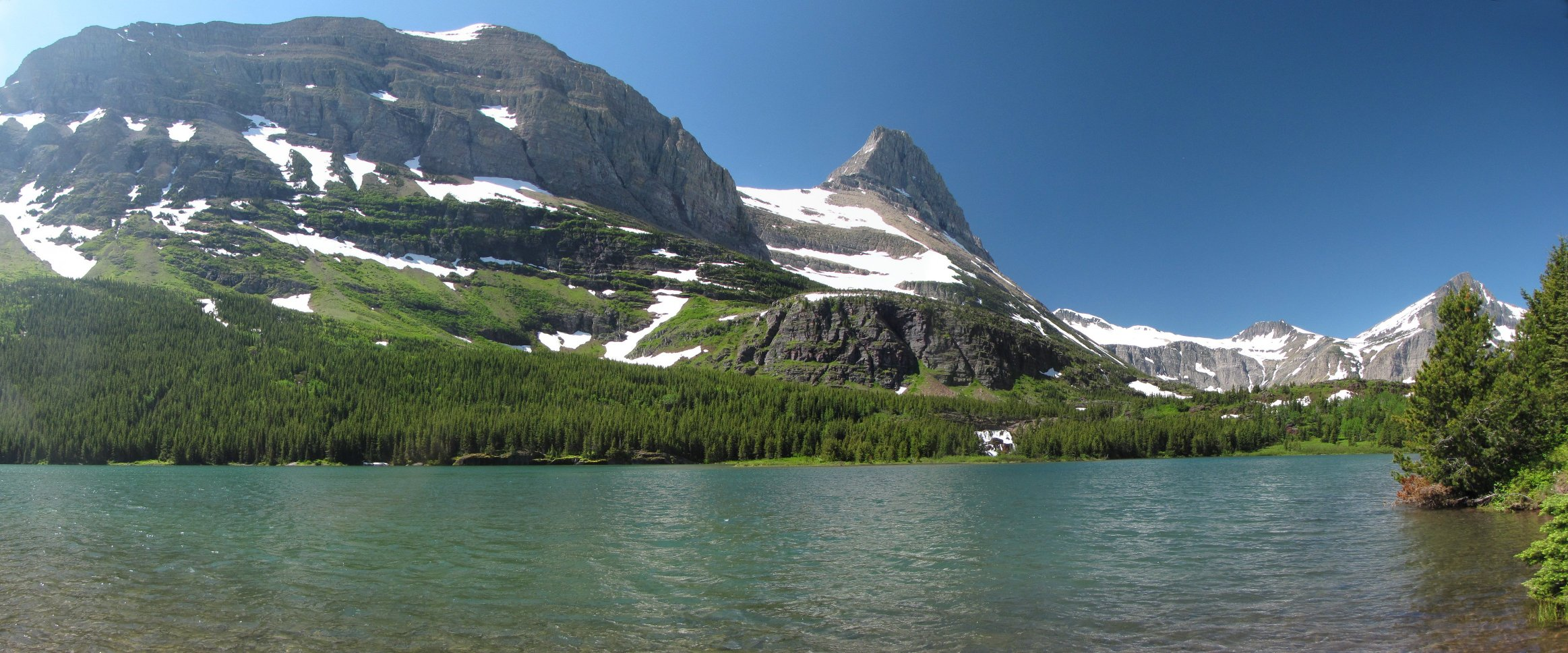
Redrock Lake with Mount Grinnell above Redrock Falls with Grinnell Point to the left.

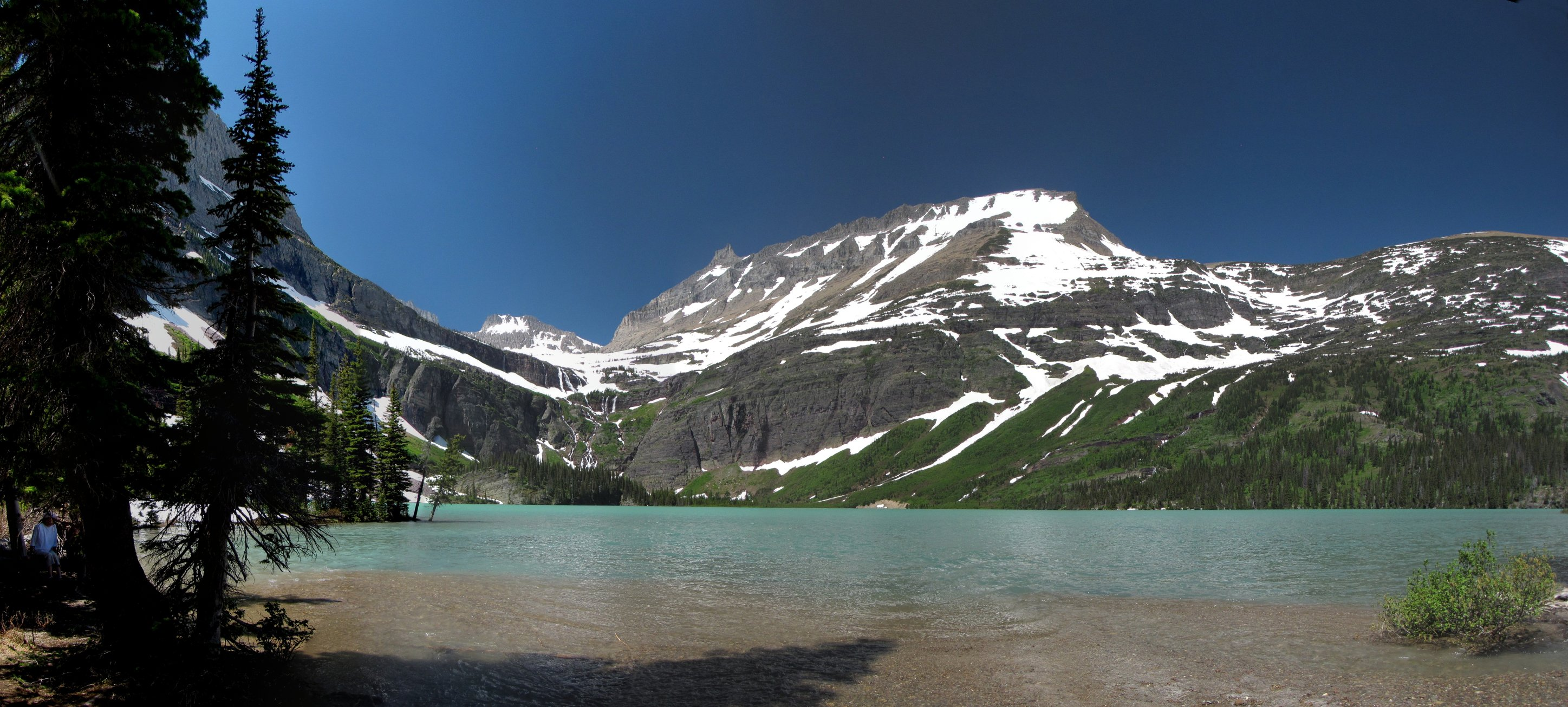
Mount Grinnell above Grinnell Lake

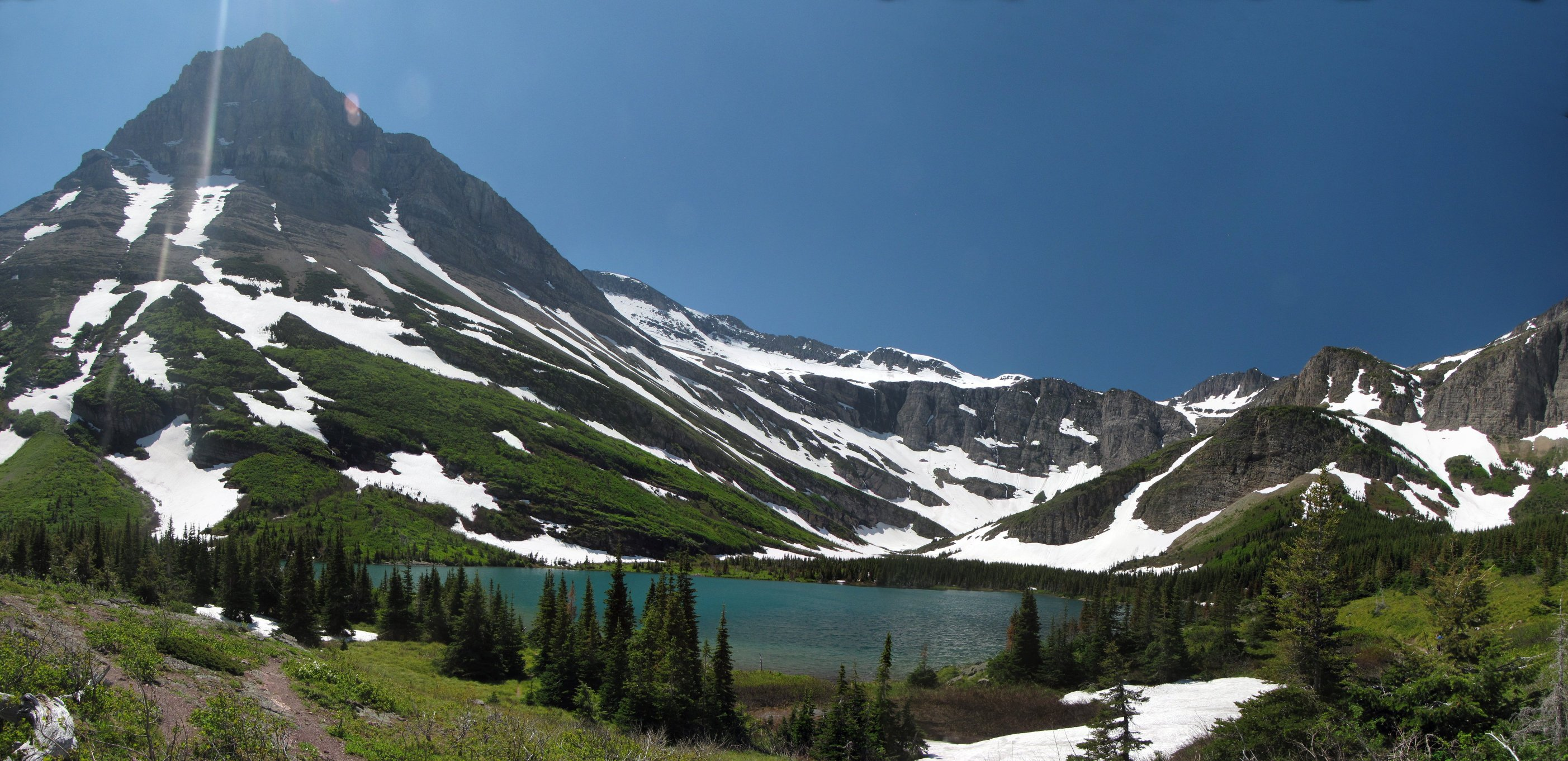
Bullhead Lake, looking towards Mount Grinnell

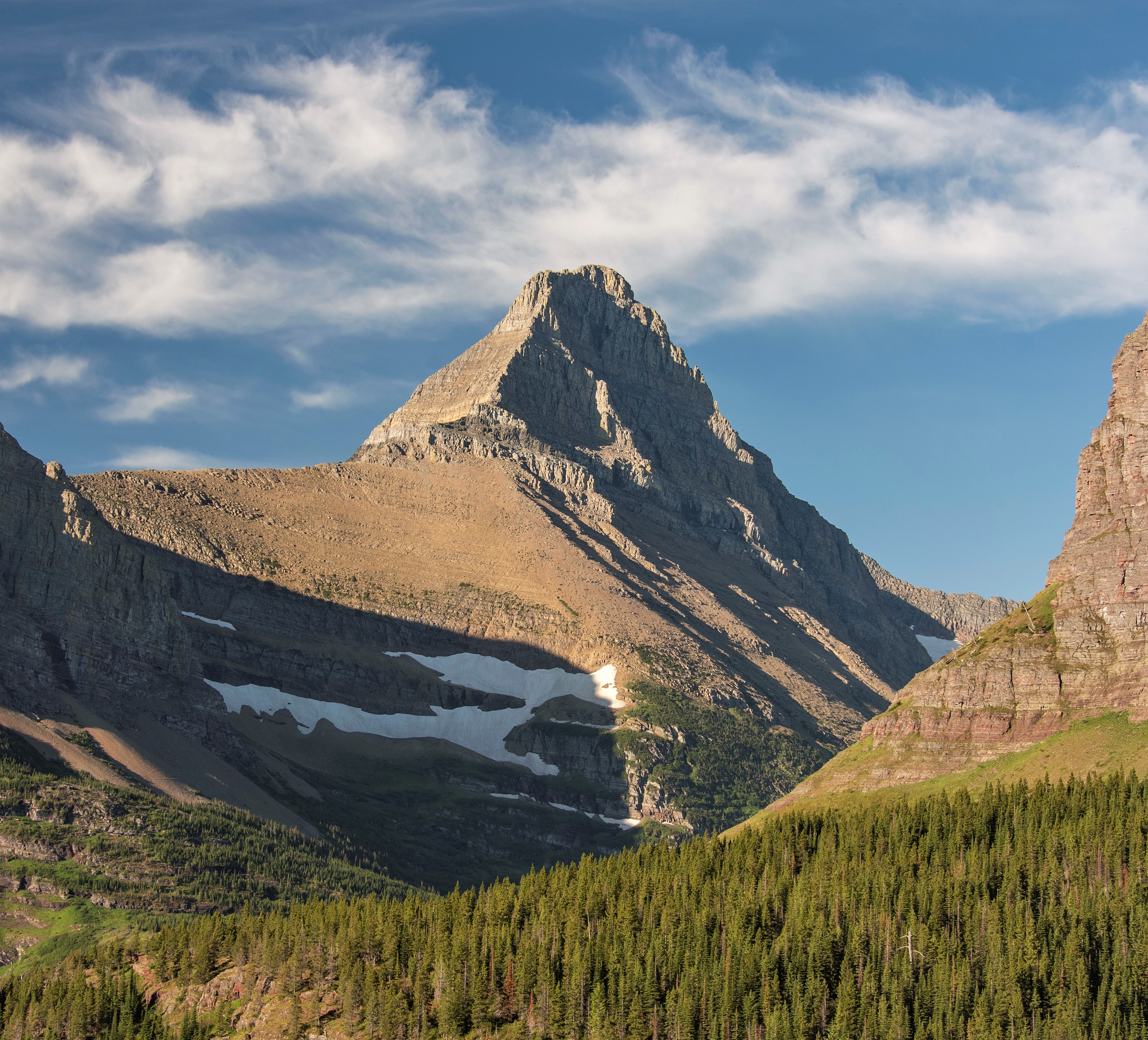
Mt. Grinnell from Iceberg Lake Trail

== See also ==
- Mountains and mountain ranges of Glacier National Park (U.S.)
