= Many Glacier =

Area in Glacier National Park in Montana

Coordinates: 48°47′51″N 113°39′27″W

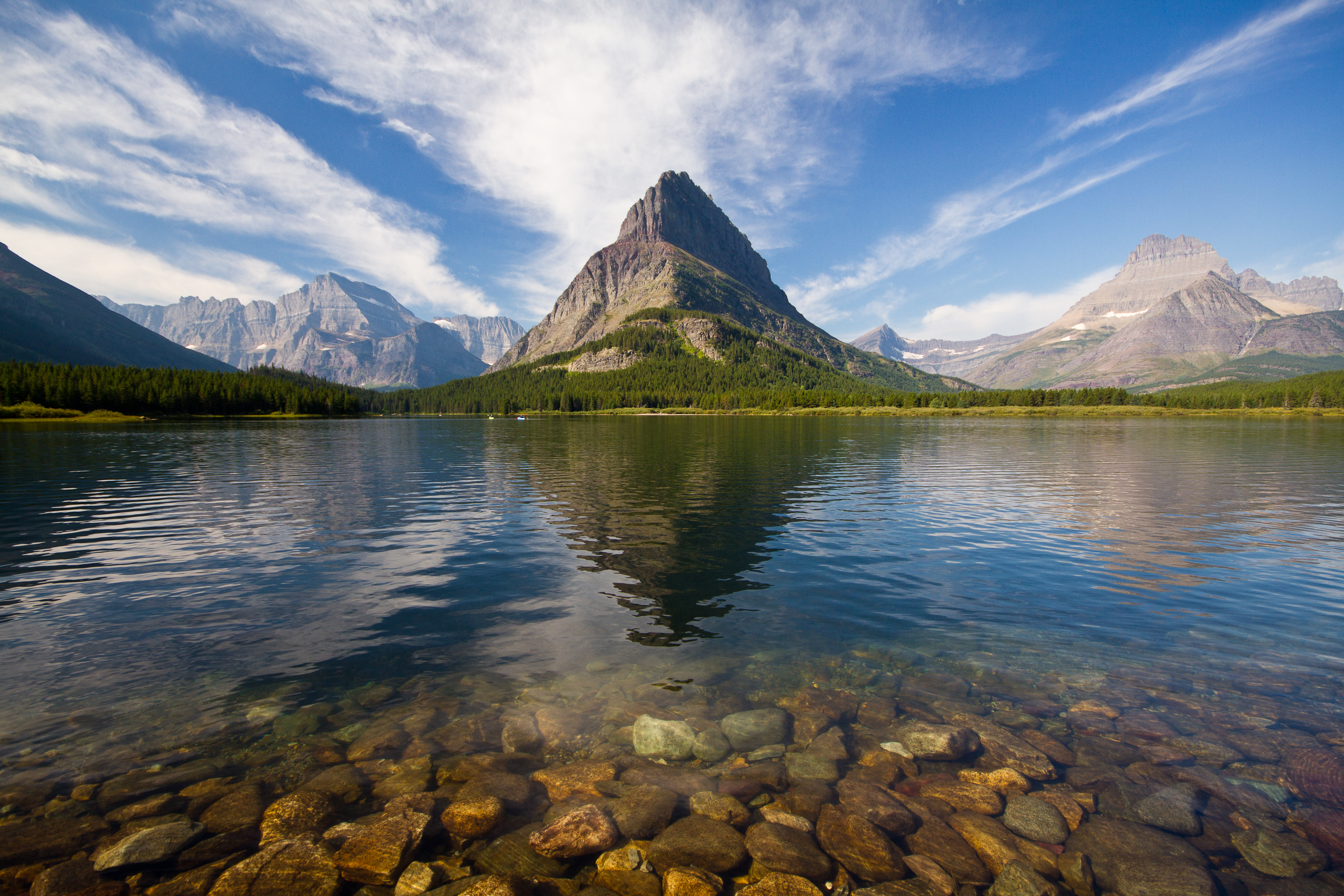
Grinnell Point rises to the west of Swiftcurrent Lake.

Many Glacier is an area within Glacier National Park in the U.S. state of Montana. The Many Glacier region is located north of the Going-to-the-Sun Road, on the east side of the park. Lake Sherburne is the large lake in the area and the Many Glacier Hotel, the largest hotel within the park, is along the shore of the adjacent Swiftcurrent Lake. The hotel and surrounding buildings are a National Historic Landmark, with original construction dating back to 1915. Many Glacier is surrounded by the high peaks of the Lewis Range, and many hiking trails can be accessed from the area. The region is noted for numerous lakes, waterfalls and dense coniferous forests interspersed with alpine meadows. Major sites in the immediate vicinity that can be accessed by trails include Lake Josephine, Grinnell Lake, Grinnell Glacier, Cracker Lake, Granite Park Chalet, Iceberg Cirque and the Ptarmigan Tunnel, a hiking tunnel carved through the mountainside during the 1930s. Tour boats allow visitors an opportunity to venture onto Swiftcurrent Lake. Other activities in the region include ranger-guided nature hikes, horseback riding, fishing and camping.
