= Grinnell Point =

Subpeak of Mount Grinnell in the state of Montana

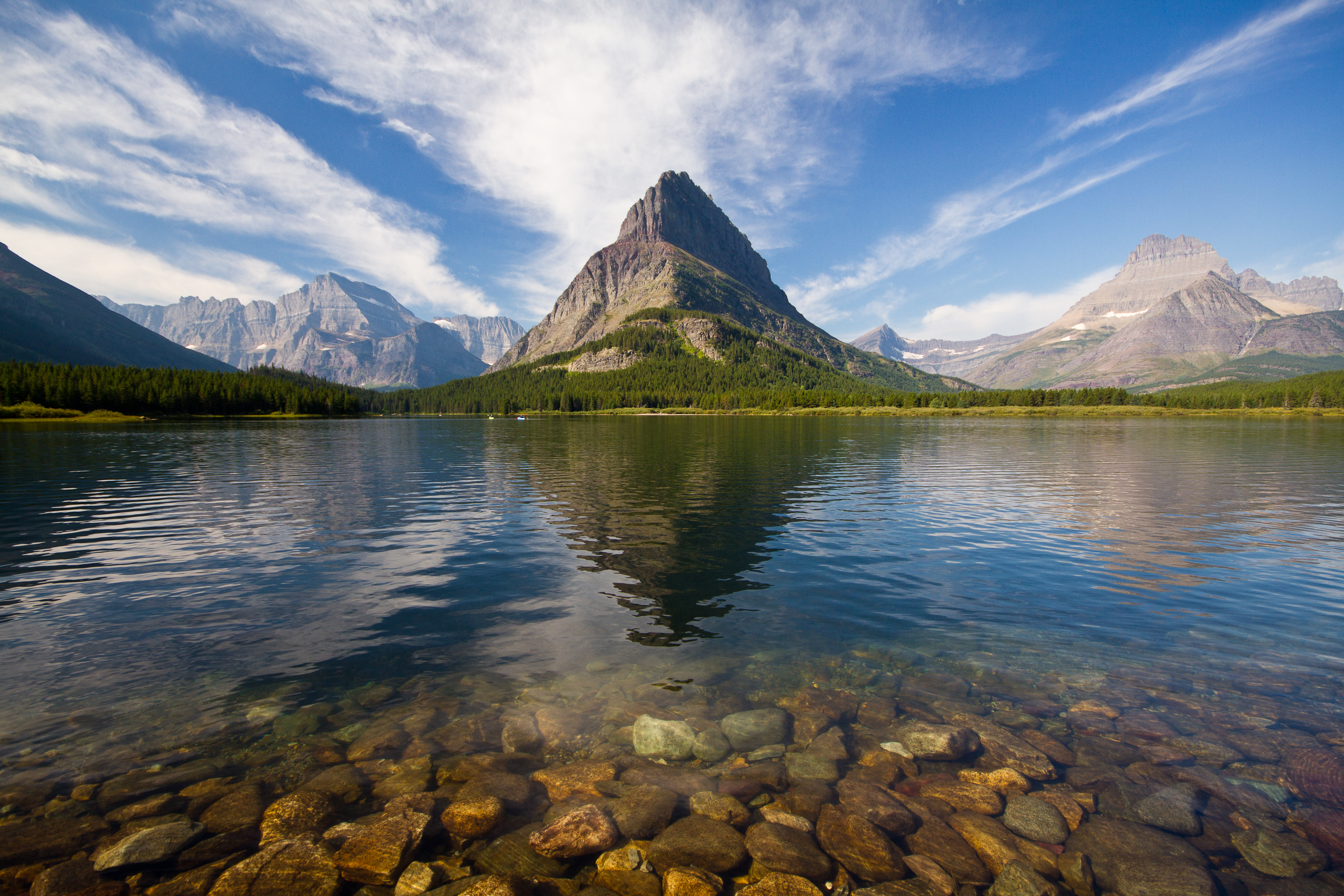
- Grinnell Point as seen from the ENE.

Highest point
- Elevation: 7,604 ft (2,318 m)
- Prominence: 160 ft (49 m)
- Coordinates: 48°47′15″N 113°40′58″W

Geography
- Location within Montana Location within the United States
- Location: Glacier County, Montana, U.S.
- Parent range: Lewis Range
- Topo map: USGS Many Glacier MT

Climbing
- First ascent: Prehistoric
- Easiest route: Scramble class 2-3

Grinnell Point (7,604 feet (2,318 m)) is located in the Lewis Range, Glacier National Park in the U.S. state of Montana. Grinnell Point is an oft-photographed mountain, situated conspicuously just west of Swiftcurrent Lake across from the Many Glacier Hotel. Grinnell Point is a subpeak of Mount Grinnell, which lies .21 mi (0.34 km) to the west-southwest and is oftentimes misidentified as Mount Grinnell since that summit cannot be seen from the roads in the Many Glacier region. Grinnell Point is named for George Bird Grinnell.

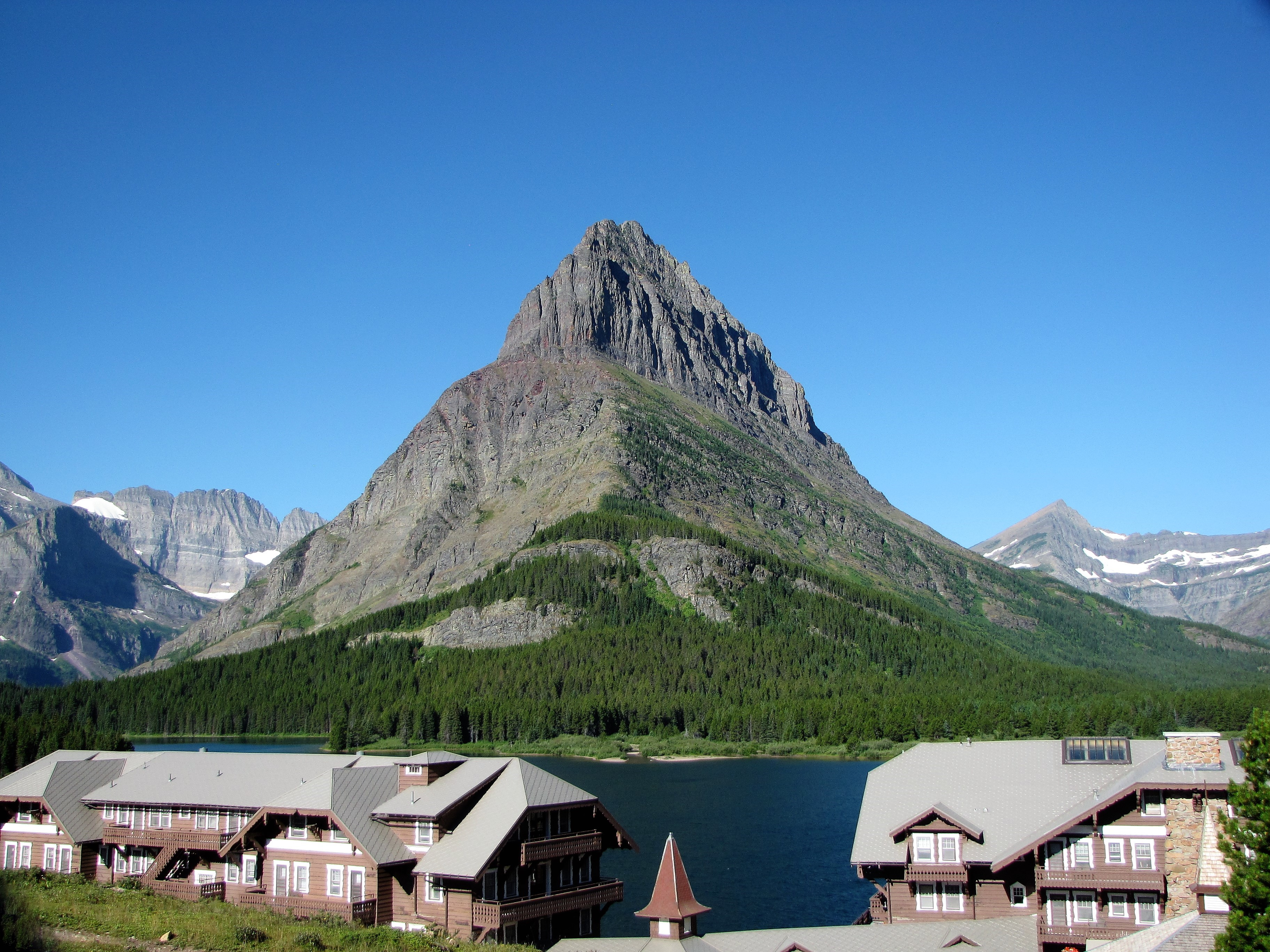
Grinnell Point rises above Swiftcurrent Lake and the Many Glacier Hotel

From the northeast with Swiftcurrent Falls.

From the east.

From the north.

== See also ==
- Mountains and mountain ranges of Glacier National Park (U.S.)
