= Altyn Peak =

Mountain in Montana, United States

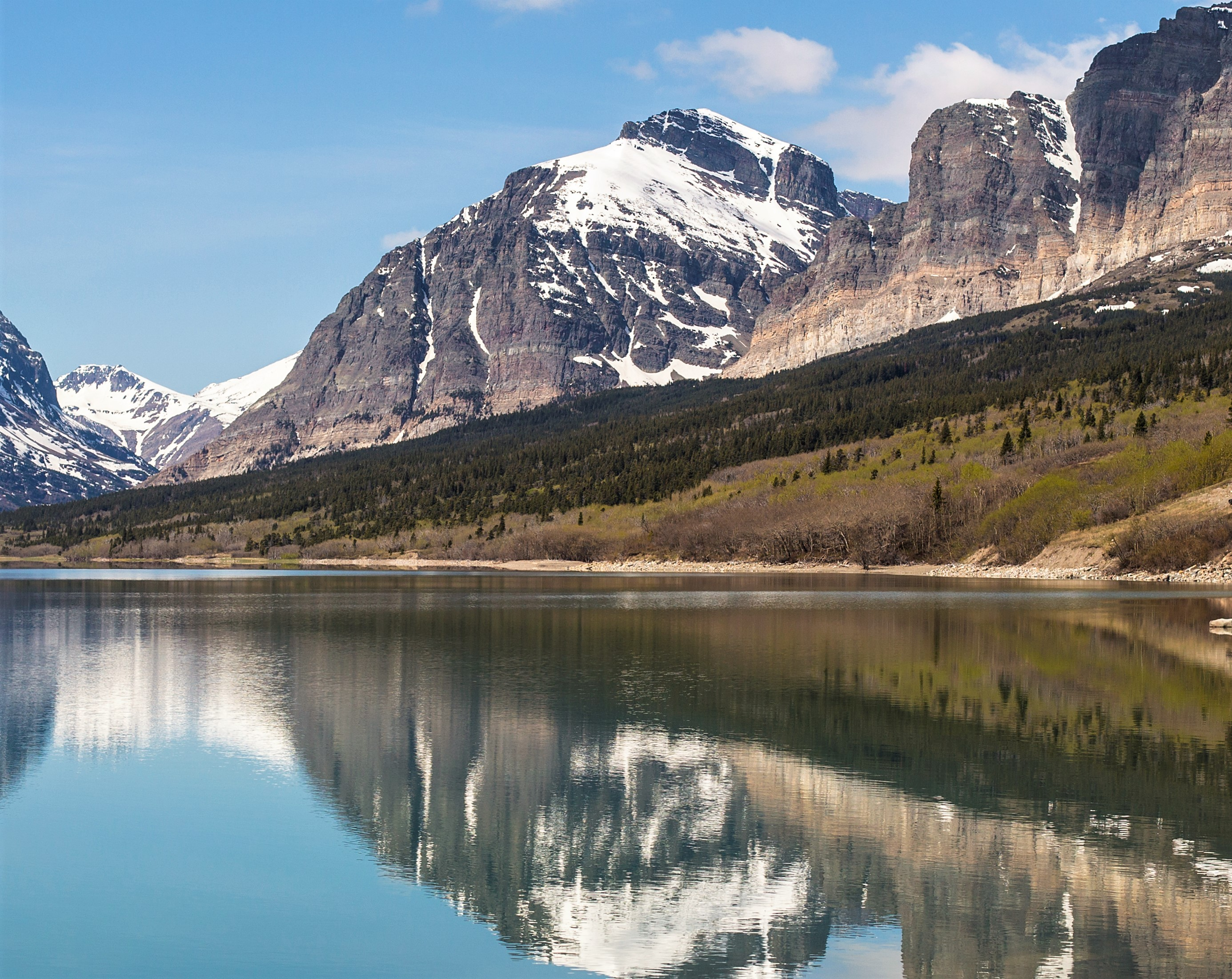
- East aspect of Altyn Peak reflected in Lake Sherburne

Highest point
- Elevation: 7,951 ft (2,423 m)
- Prominence: 587 ft (179 m)
- Coordinates: 48°48′47″N 113°39′23″W

Geography
- Location within Montana
- Location: Glacier County, Montana, U.S.
- Parent range: Lewis Range
- Topo map: USGS Many Glacier MT

Climbing
- First ascent: Unknown
- Easiest route: Scramble class III

Altyn Peak (7,951 feet; 2,423 m) is located in the Lewis Range, Glacier National Park in the U.S. state of Montana. Altyn Peak is situated just north of Swiftcurrent Lake and the Many Glacier Hotel and is easily seen from both locations. The peak is named after Dave Greenwood Altyn who was a financial backer of a local mine in the late 1800s; the mining town of Altyn was at the junction of Canyon Creek and Swiftcurrent Lake. The peak was known as Crow Feet Mountain after the last chief of the Blackfeet confederacy of tribes.

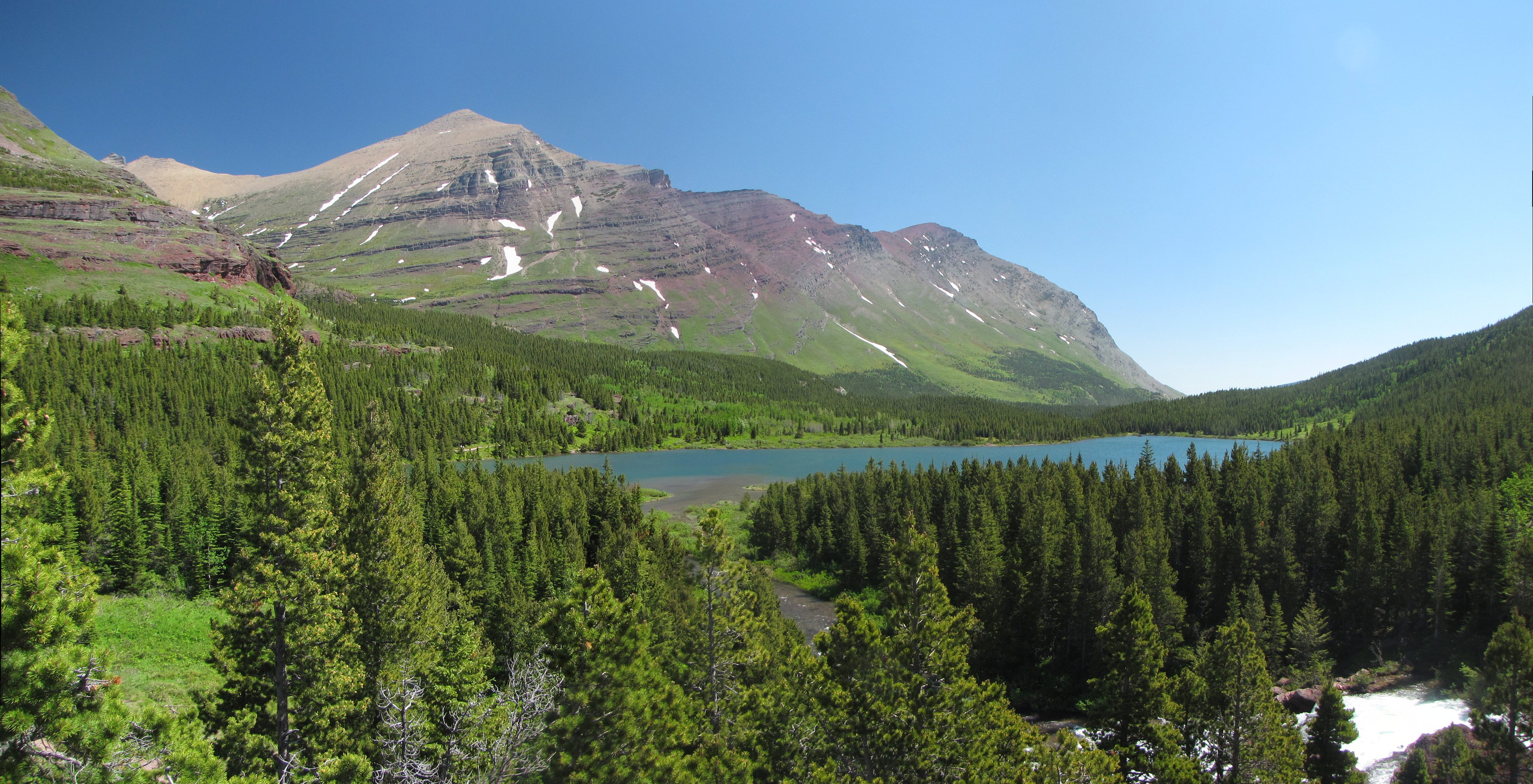
Red Rock lake with Mount Henkel and Altyn Peak. Taken from Redrock Falls.

== See also ==
- Mountains and mountain ranges of Glacier National Park (U.S.)
