= Mount Henkel =

Mountain in Montana, United States

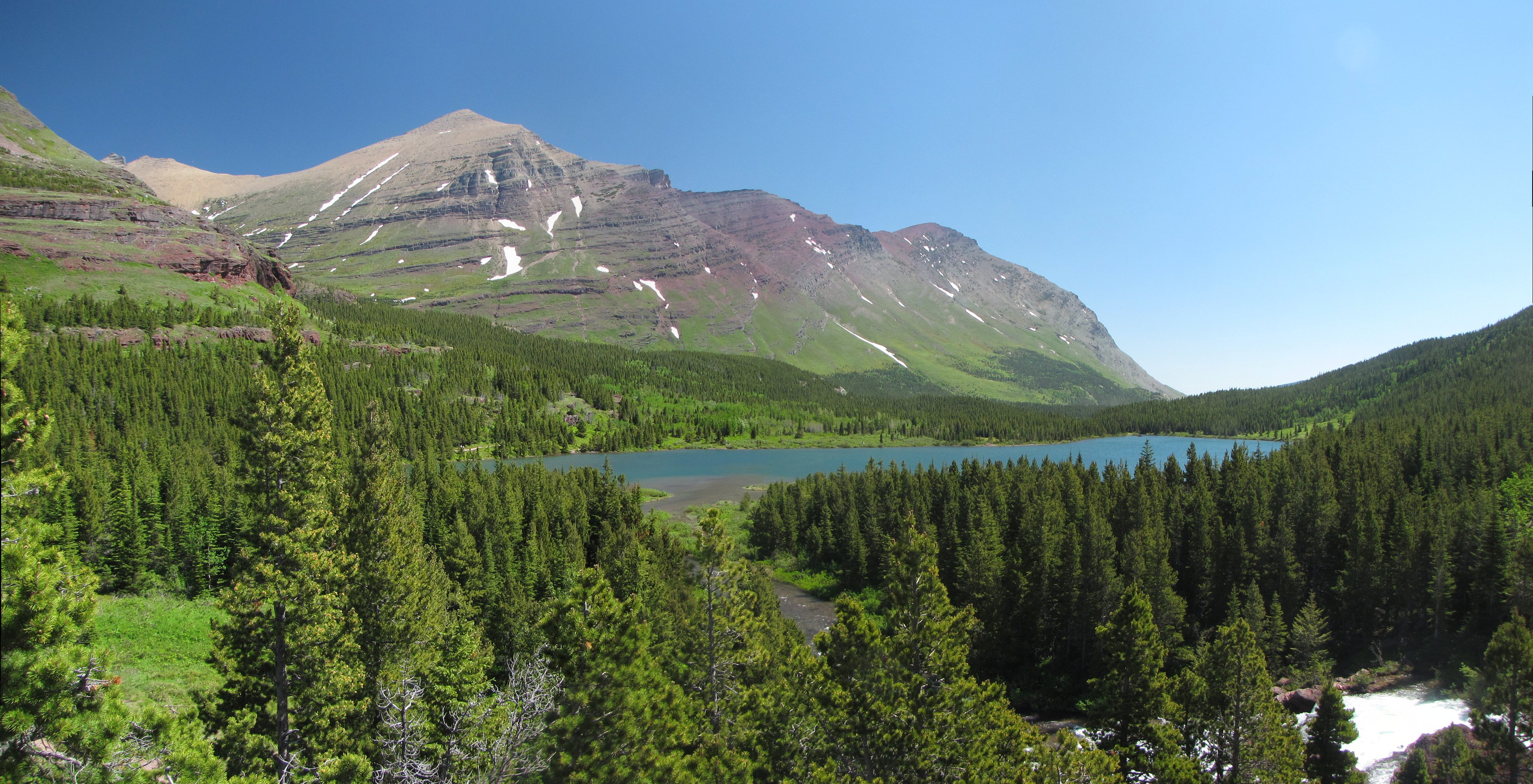
- Mt. Henkel and Altyn Peak from above Redrock Lake

Highest point
- Elevation: 8,774 ft (2,674 m) NAVD 88
- Prominence: 610 ft (190 m)
- Coordinates: 48°49′18″N 113°41′00″W

Geography
- Location within Montana Location within the United States
- Location: Glacier County, Montana, U.S.
- Parent range: Lewis Range
- Topo map(s): USGS Many Glacier, MT

Mount Henkel (8,774 feet (2,674 m)) is located in the Lewis Range, Glacier National Park in the U.S. state of Montana. Kennedy Lake is just to the north of the mountain.

== Geology ==
Like other mountains in Glacier National Park, the peak is composed of sedimentary rock laid down during the Precambrian to Jurassic periods. Formed in shallow seas, this sedimentary rock was initially uplifted beginning 170 million years ago when the Lewis Overthrust fault pushed an enormous slab of precambrian rocks 3 mi (4.8 km) thick, 50 miles (80 km) wide and 160 miles (260 km) long over younger rock of the cretaceous period.

== Climate ==
Based on the Köppen climate classification, the peak is located in an alpine subarctic climate zone with long, cold, snowy winters, and cool to warm summers. Temperatures can drop below −10 °F with wind chill factors below −30 °F.

== Gallery ==
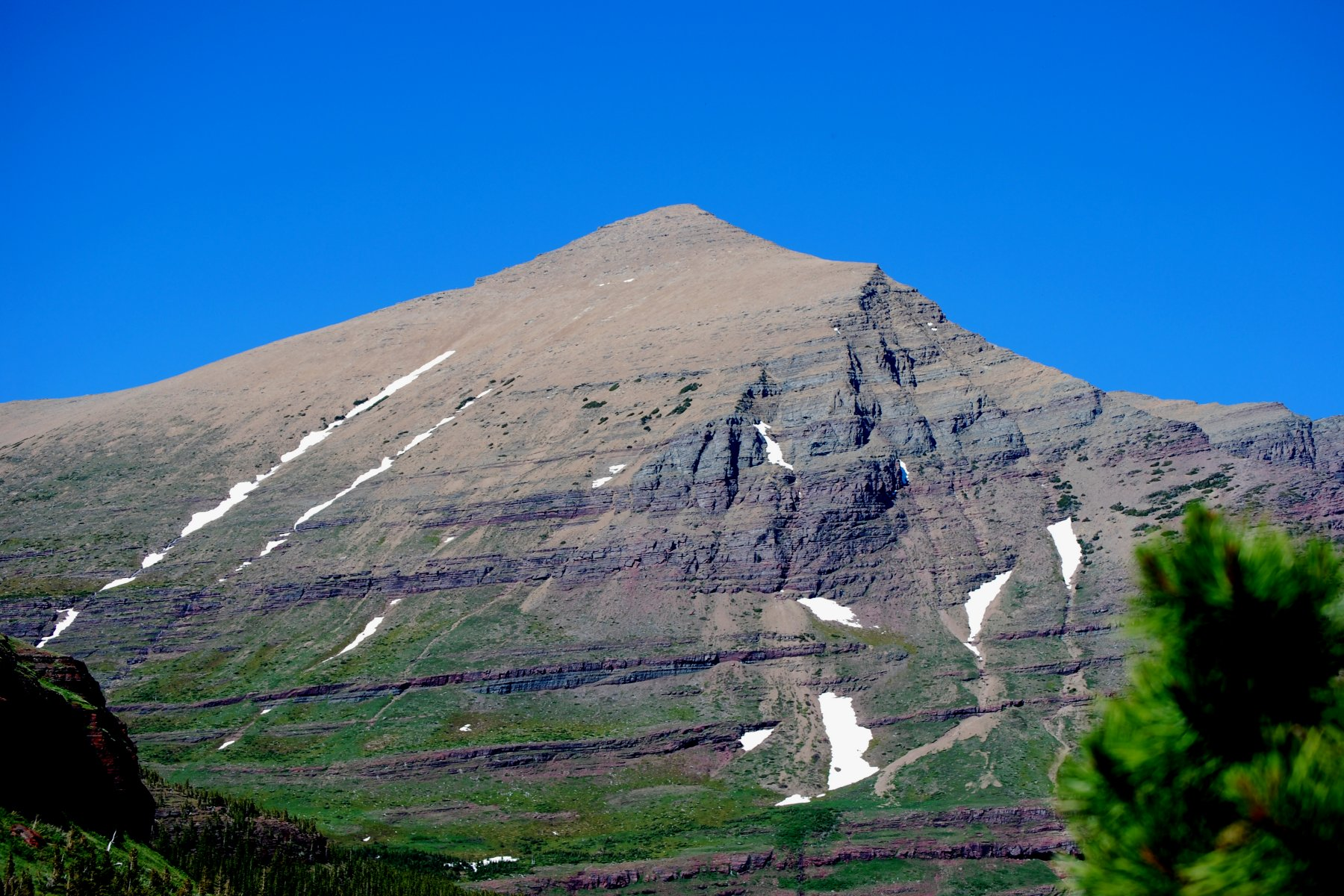
Southwest aspect

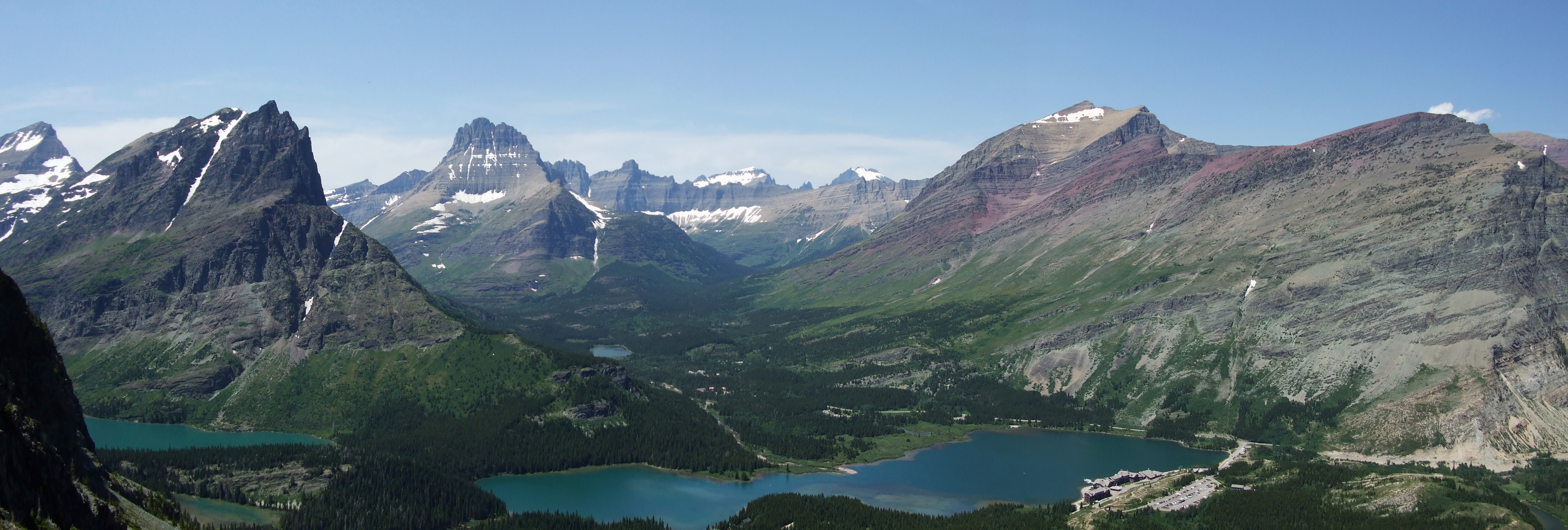
Grinnell Point, Mt. Wilbur, Mt. Henkel (right of center)

== See also ==
- Mountains and mountain ranges of Glacier National Park (U.S.)
