= B-7 Pillar =

Pillar in Montana, United States

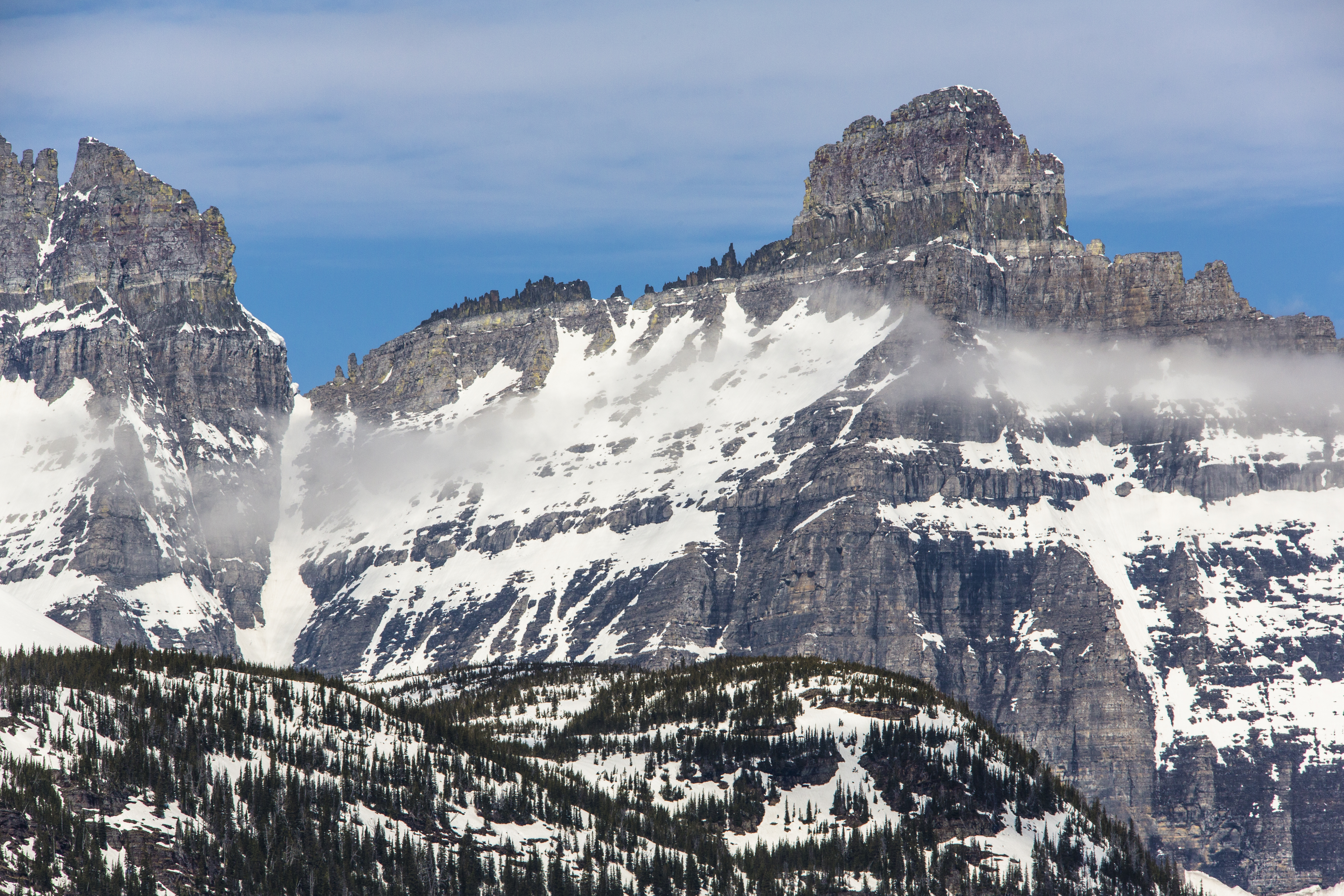
- B-7 Pillar and Iceberg Notch

Highest point
- Elevation: 8,716 ft (2,657 m)
- Prominence: 392 ft (119 m)
- Coordinates: 48°49′20″N 113°45′10″W

Geography
- Location within Montana Location within the United States
- Location: Glacier County, Montana, U.S.
- Parent range: Lewis Range
- Topo map: USGS Ahern Pass MT

Climbing
- Easiest route: class 5 climbing

B-7 Pillar (8,716 feet (2,657 m)) is located in the Lewis Range, Glacier National Park in the U.S. state of Montana. The summit is located just northeast of Iceberg Peak, and one-half mile east of the Continental Divide.

== Climate ==
Based on the Köppen climate classification, it is located in an alpine subarctic climate zone with long, cold, snowy winters, and cool to warm summers. Temperatures can drop below −10 °F with wind chill factors below −30 °F.

== Geology ==
Like other mountains in Glacier National Park, it is composed of sedimentary rock laid down during the Precambrian to Jurassic periods. Formed in shallow seas, this sedimentary rock was initially uplifted beginning 170 million years ago when the Lewis Overthrust fault pushed an enormous slab of precambrian rocks 3 mi (4.8 km) thick, 50 miles (80 km) wide and 160 miles (260 km) long over younger rock of the cretaceous period.

== Gallery ==
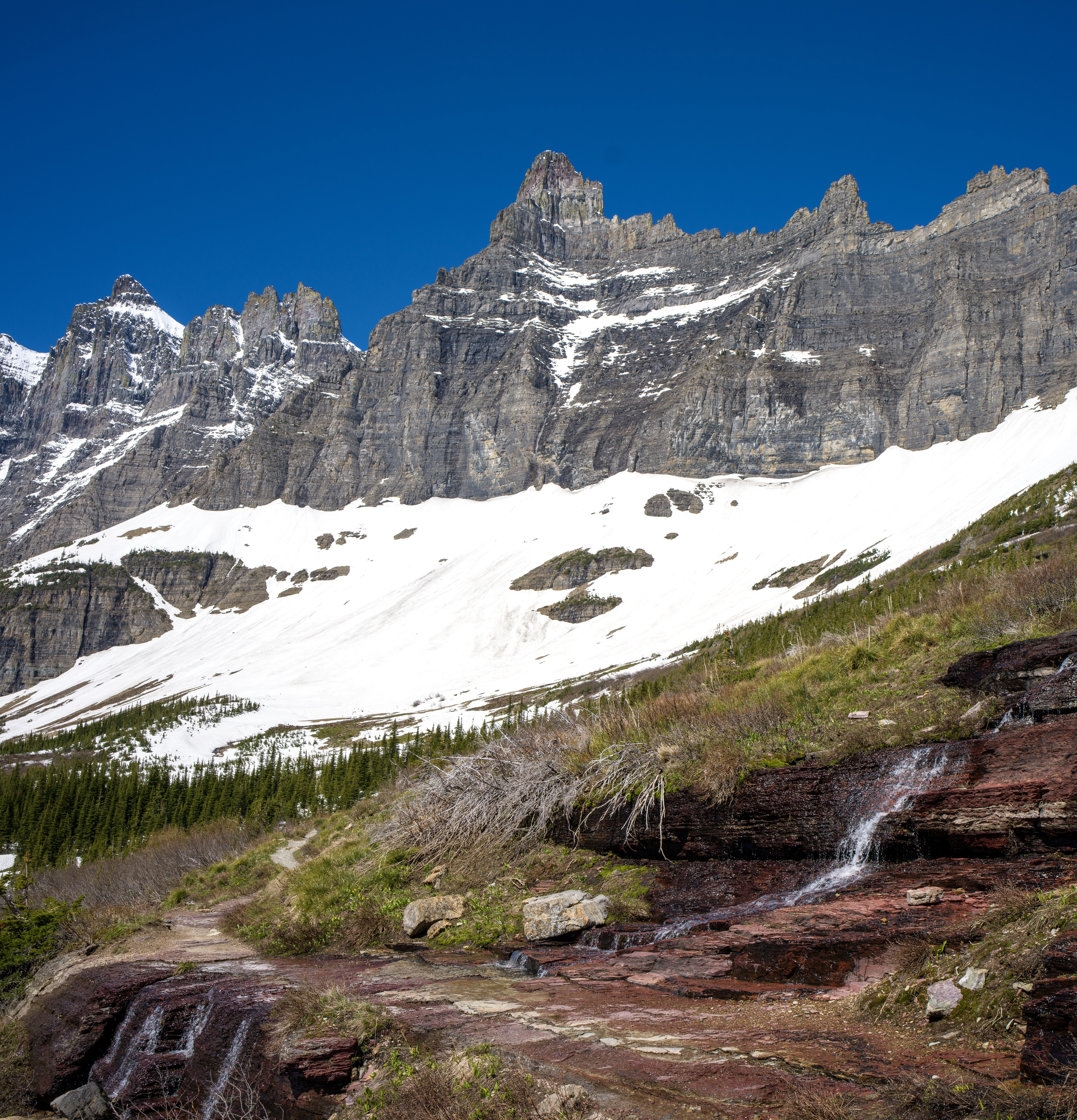
B-7 Pillar centered

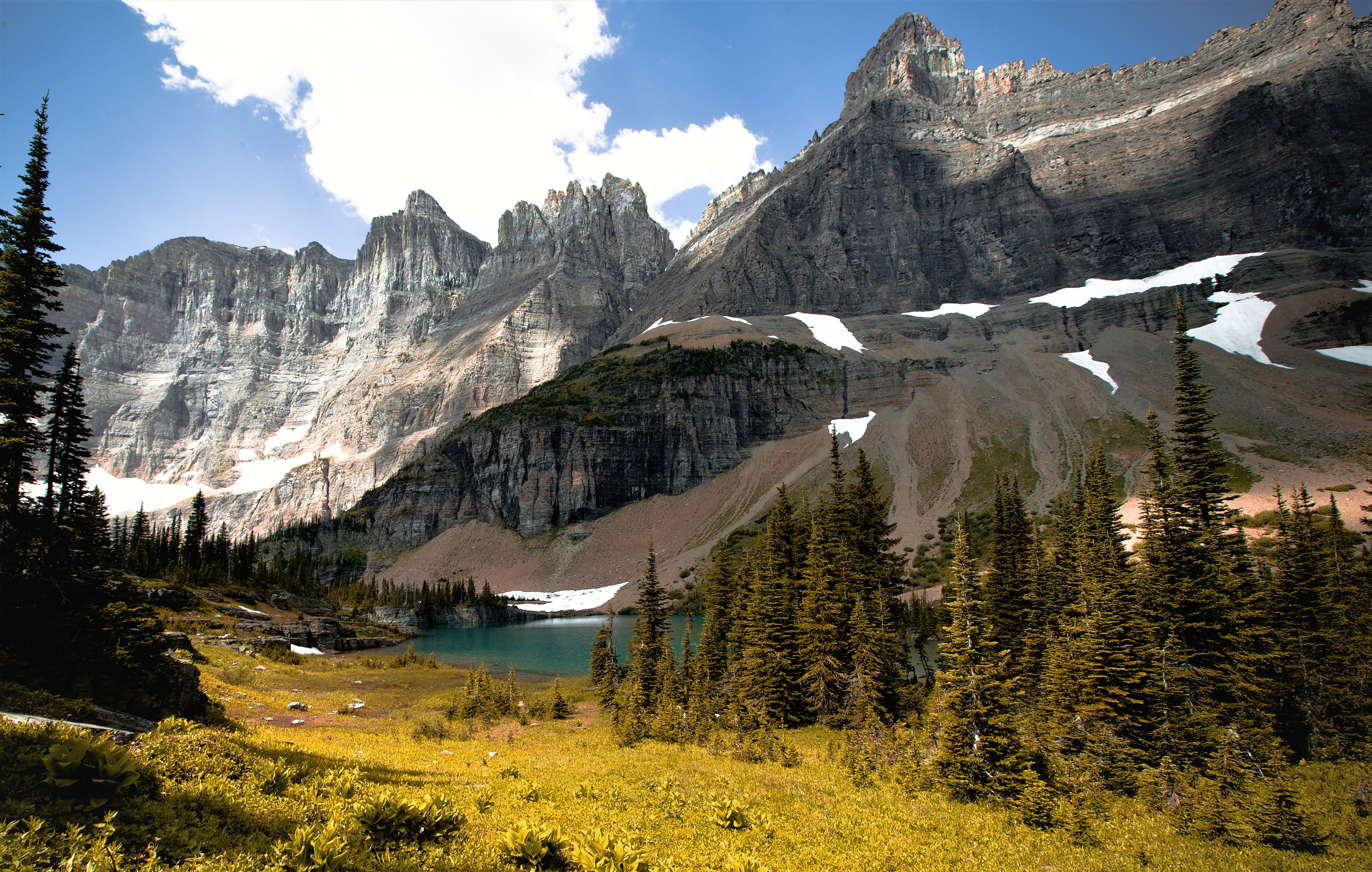
B-7 Pillar right of center, Iceberg Peak to left

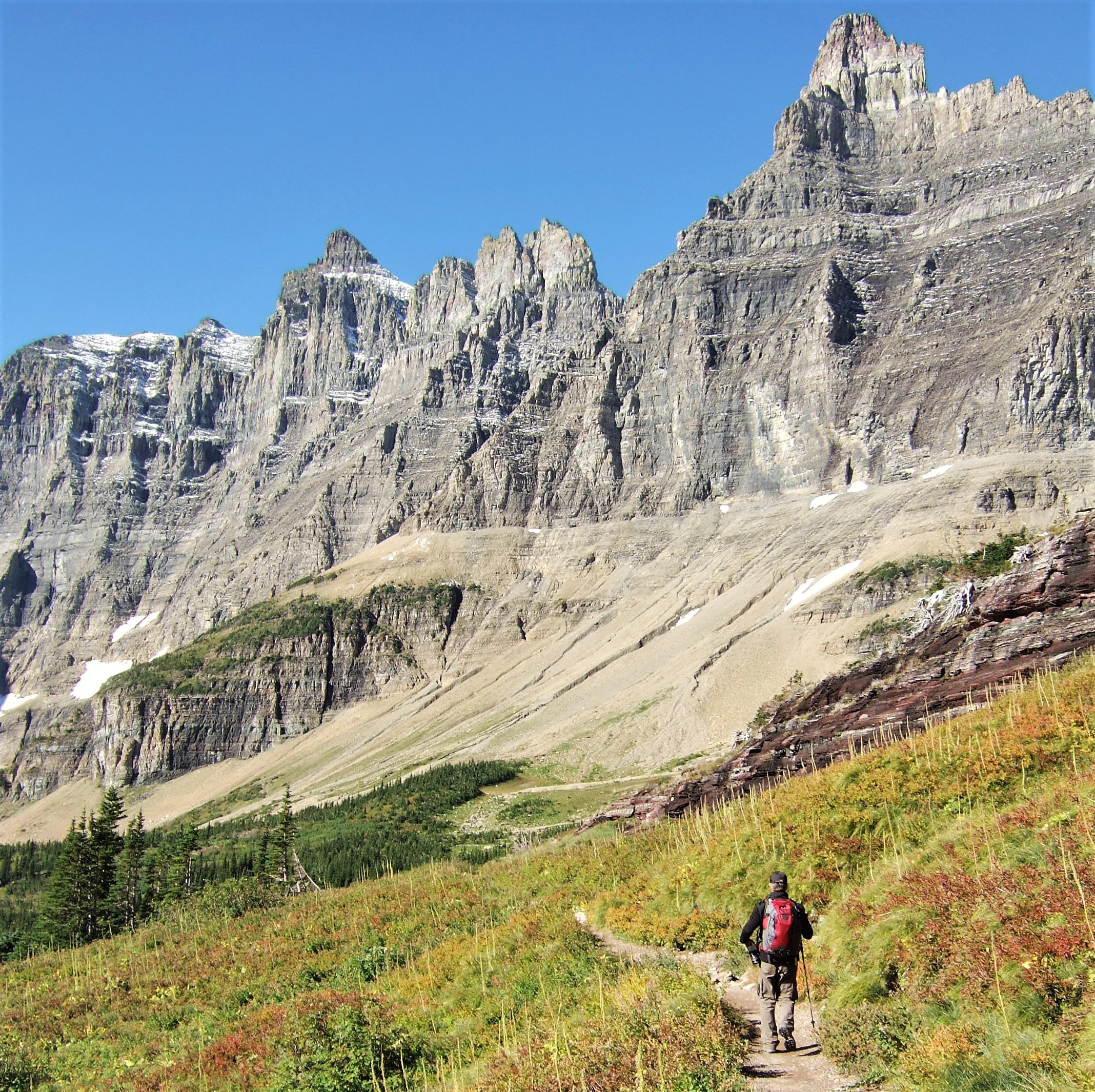
B-7 Pillar upper right, Iceberg Peak to left

B-7 Pillar, southeast face

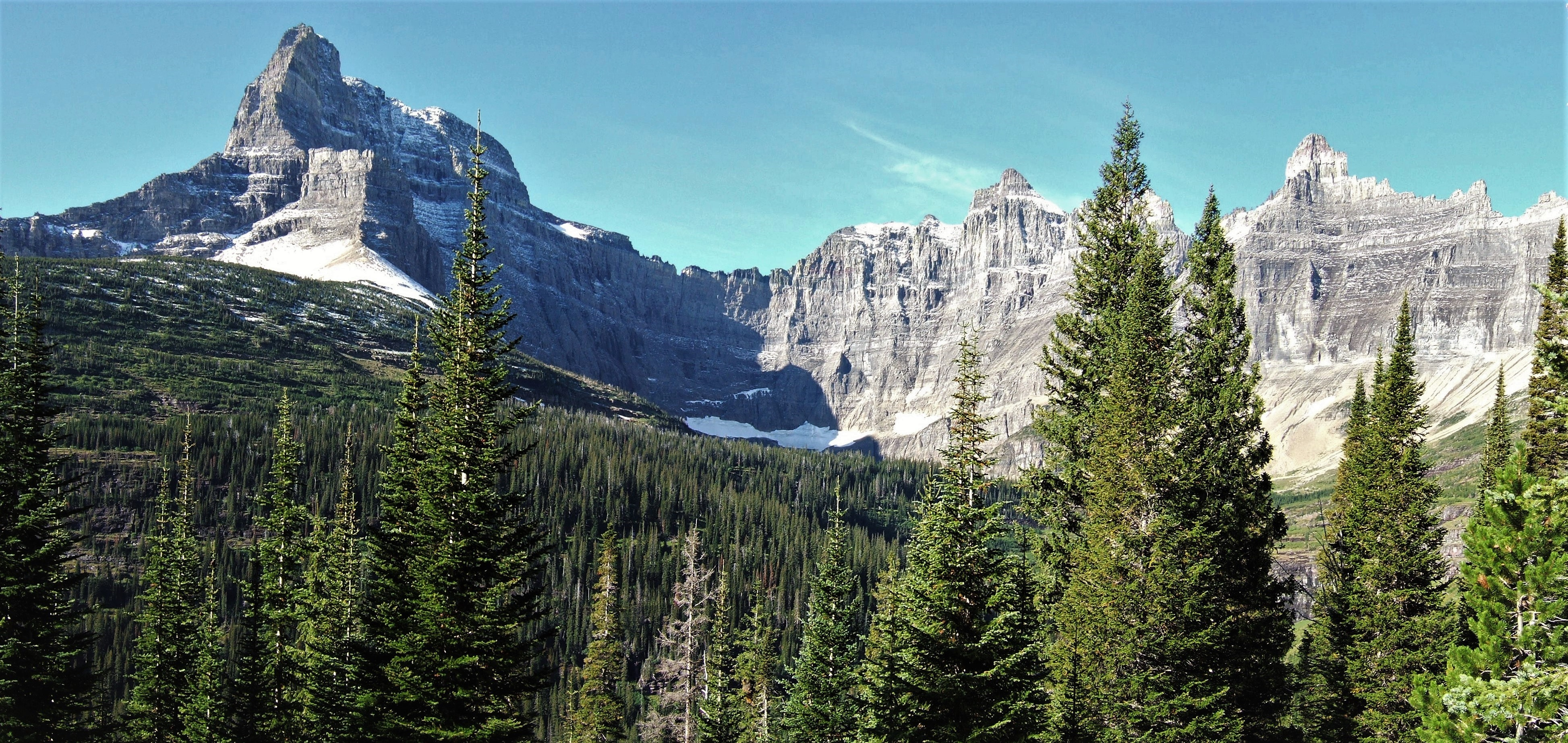
Mount Wilbur (left) - Iceberg Peak - B-7 Pillar (right).

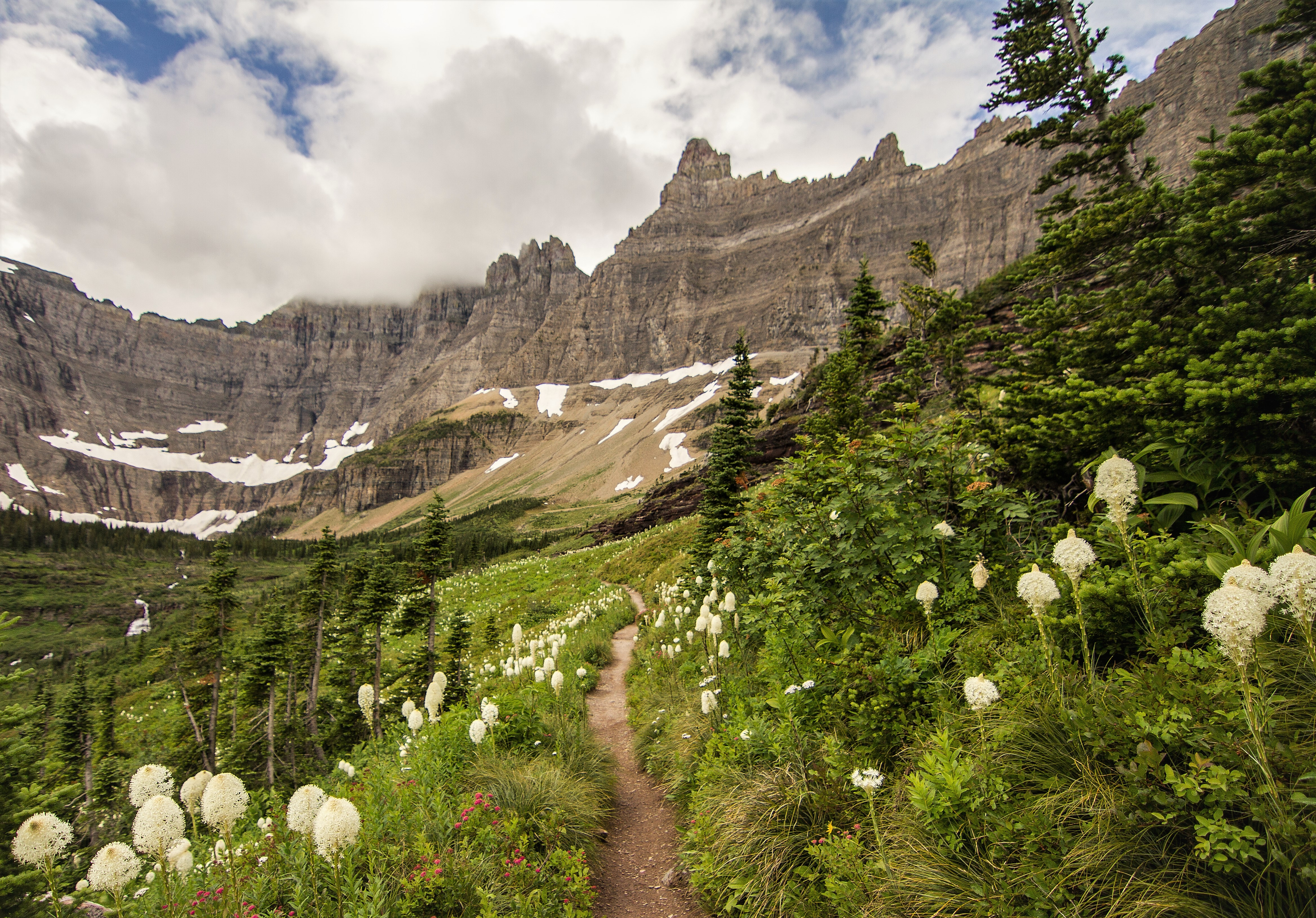
B-7 Pillar from Iceberg Lake Trail

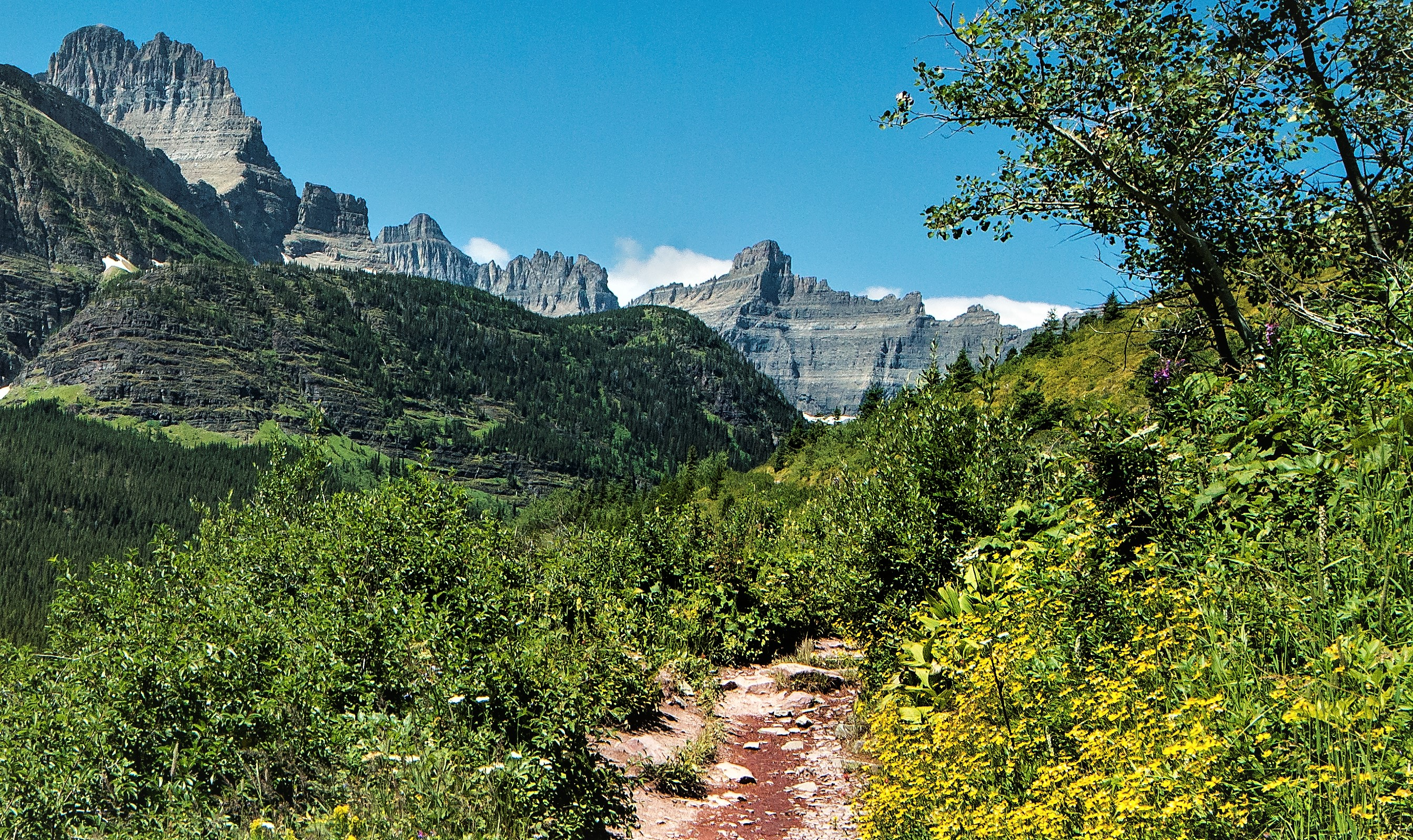
Mount Wilbur (left) and B-7 Pillar (center) seen from Iceberg Lake Trail.

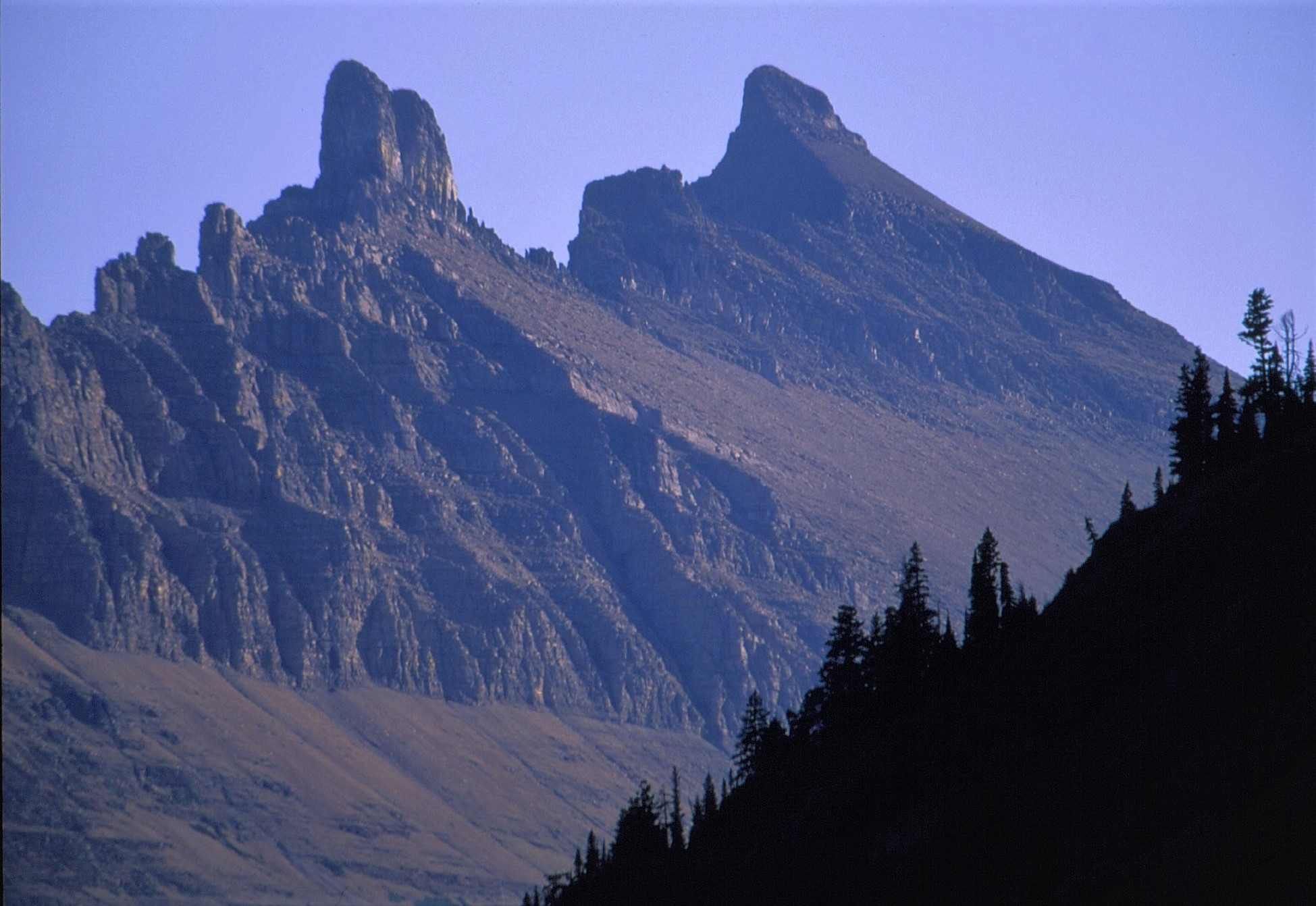
B-7 Pillar (left) and Iceberg Peak seen from the north at Helen Lake.

== See also ==
- Mountains and mountain ranges of Glacier National Park (U.S.)
