= Lake Josephine (Montana) =

Lake in Glacier County, Montana, United States

- Lake Josephine looking south-southwest. Mount Gould and Angel Wing in the back.

- Location within Montana Location within the United States
- Location: Glacier National Park,
- Coordinates: 48°46′49″N 113°40′35″W
- Type: Natural
- Primary inflows: Catarack Creek
- Primary outflows: Stump Lake
- Basin countries: United States
- Max. length: 1.10 miles (1.77 km)
- Max. width: .30 miles (0.48 km)
- Surface elevation: 4,882 ft (1,488 m)

Lake Josephine is located in Glacier National Park, in the U. S. state of Montana. Swiftcurrent Lake is immediately to the northeast of Lake Josephine and the two lakes are separated by a short (.3 miles (0.48 km)) stream. Lake Josephine is accessible via the Grinnell Glacier Trail which follows the west shoreline of the lake for 1 mile (1.6 km).

== See also ==
- List of lakes in Glacier County, Montana
