= Iceberg Lake =

Lake in the American state of Montana

- Location within Montana Location within the United States
- Location: Glacier National Park, Glacier County, Montana, US
- Coordinates: 48°48′44″N 113°44′59″W
- Lake type: Natural
- Primary outflows: Iceberg Creek
- Basin countries: United States
- Max. length: .50 miles (0.80 km)
- Max. width: .35 miles (0.56 km)
- Surface elevation: 6,094 ft (1,857 m)

Iceberg Lake is located in Glacier National Park, in the U. S. state of Montana. Mount Wilbur is south and Iceberg Peak is west of Iceberg Lake. Iceberg Peak towers more than 3,000 feet (910 m) above the lake. A popular day hike destination, Iceberg Lake is a 4.8 miles (7.7 km) hike from the Swiftcurrent Auto Camp Historic District.

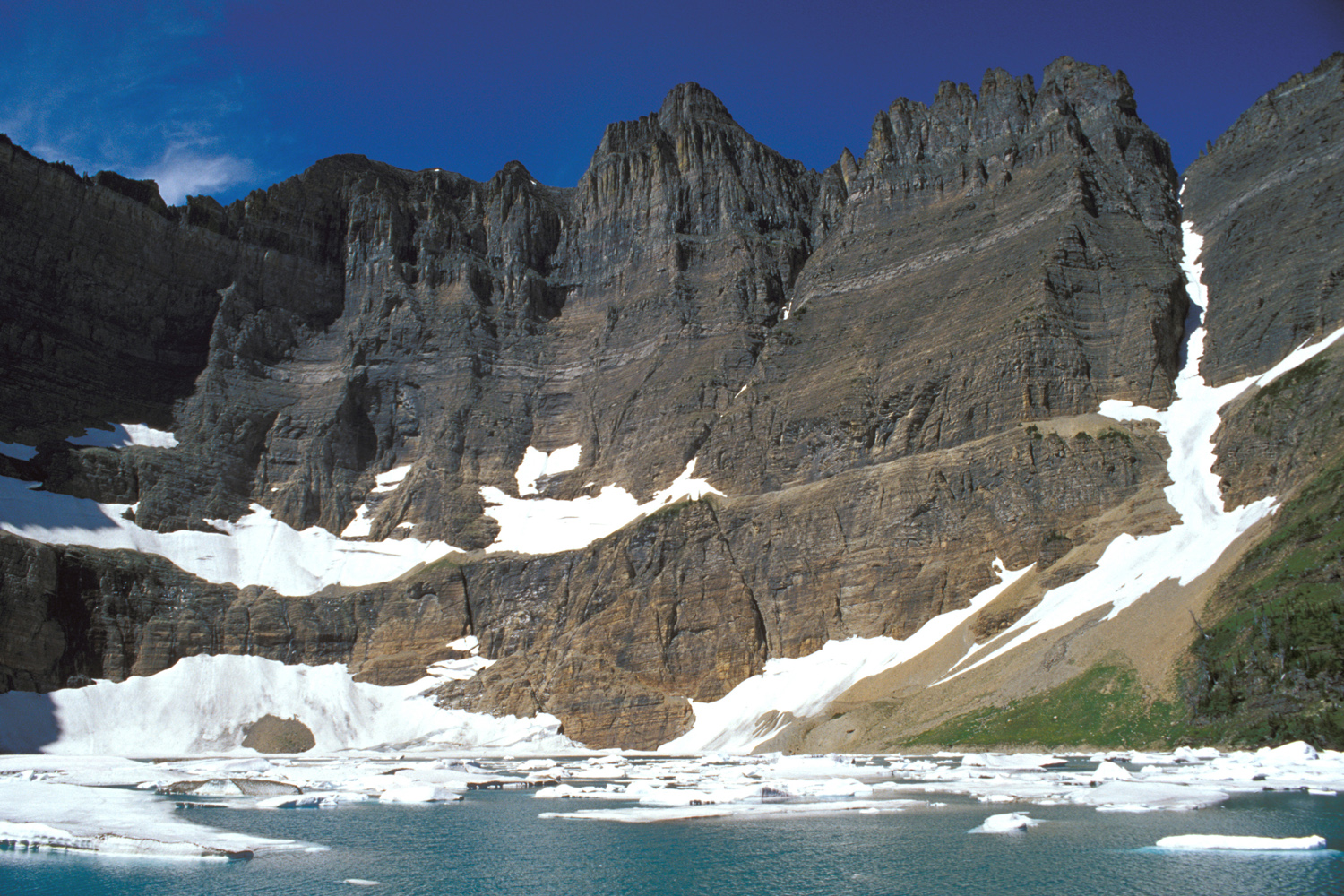
Iceberg Lake below Iceberg Peak

== See also ==
- List of lakes in Glacier County, Montana
