= Mount Wilbur (Montana) =

Mountain in Montana, United States

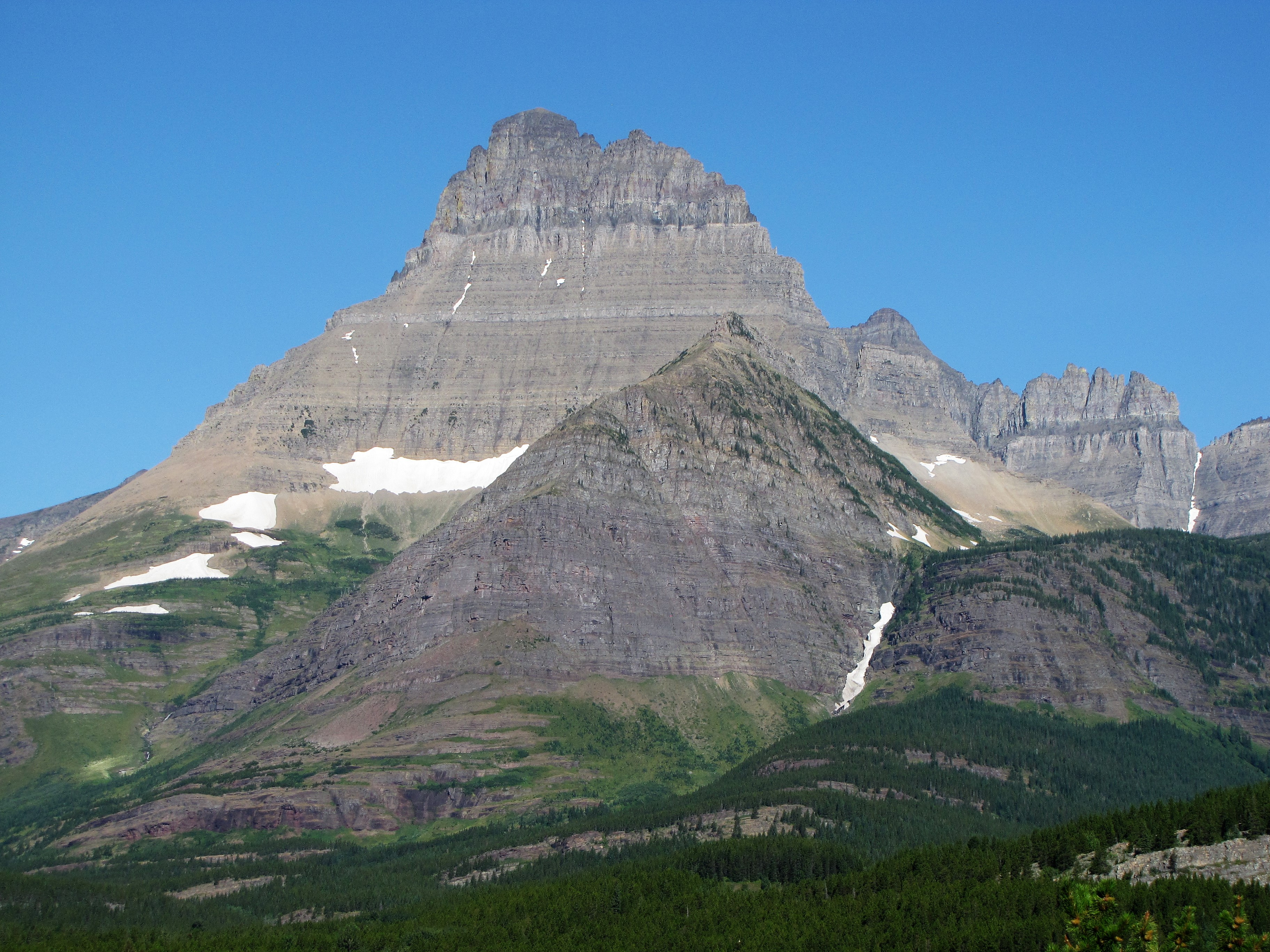
- East face of Mount Wilbur

Highest point
- Elevation: 9,326 ft (2,843 m)
- Prominence: 2,136 ft (651 m)
- Parent peak: Mount Gould
- Listing: Mountains in Glacier County, Montana
- Coordinates: 48°48′20″N 113°44′21″W

Naming
- Etymology: Edward R. Wilbur

Geography
- Location within Montana Location within the United States
- Location: Glacier County, Montana, U.S.
- Parent range: Lewis Range
- Topo map(s): USGS Many Glacier, MT

Climbing
- First ascent: 1923 (Norman Clyde)
- Easiest route: Climb, class 4

Mount Wilbur (9,326 feet (2,843 m)) is located in the Lewis Range, Glacier National Park in the U.S. state of Montana. Plainly visible from the region of Many Glacier, the peak rises over 4,500 feet (1,372 m) above Swiftcurrent Lake and is a steep pyramid on three sides. The west slopes of the peak join to ridges along the continental divide. Much of the climbing routes are rated at class 4 to 5, with some only used once. The sedimentary rock of the mountains makes for often poor anchoring points and enhances the difficulty. A cirque on the north slopes of the mountain shelters Iceberg Lake, a popular hiking destination from Many Glacier. The mountain was named by George Bird Grinnell in 1885, for Edward R. Wilbur of New York, one of Grinnell's partners in the Forest and Stream Publishing Company (forerunner of Field & Stream magazine), and both men were founders of the Audubon Society.

== Geology ==
Like other mountains in Glacier National Park, the peak is composed of sedimentary rock laid down during the Precambrian to Jurassic periods. Formed in shallow seas, this sedimentary rock was initially uplifted beginning 170 million years ago when the Lewis Overthrust fault pushed an enormous slab of precambrian rocks 3 mi (4.8 km) thick, 50 miles (80 km) wide and 160 miles (260 km) long over younger rock of the cretaceous period. The bulk of the peak is composed of limestone of the Siyeh Formation, and the conspicuous dark band is a diorite sill.

== Climate ==
Based on the Köppen climate classification, the peak is located in an alpine subarctic climate zone with long, cold, snowy winters, and cool to warm summers. Temperatures can drop below −10 °F with wind chill factors below −30 °F.

== Gallery ==
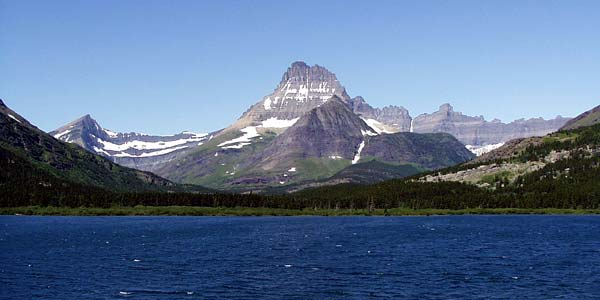
Mount Wilbur rises above Swiftcurrent Lake

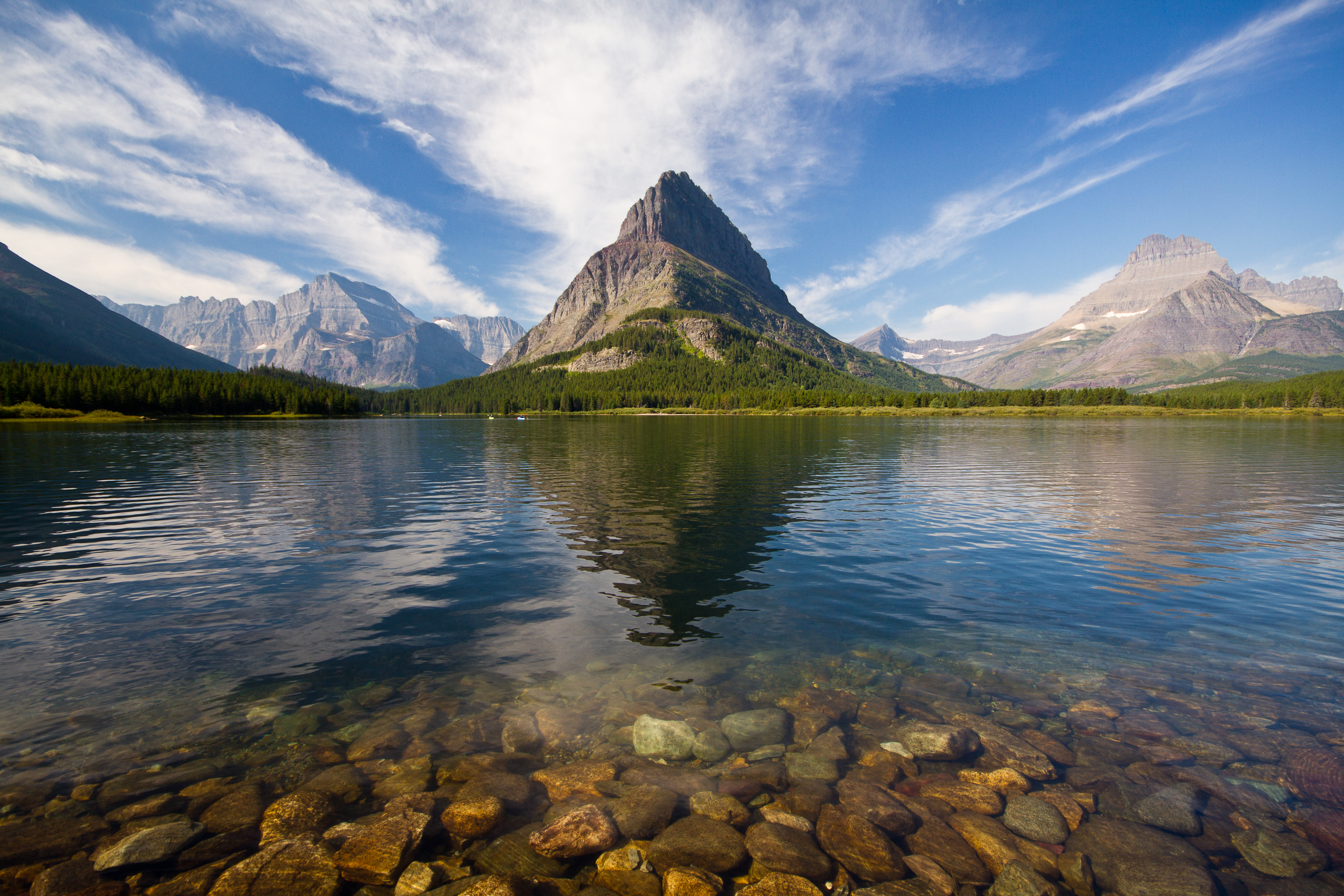
Mount Gould, Grinnell Point and Mount Wilbur left to right beyond Swiftcurrent Lake

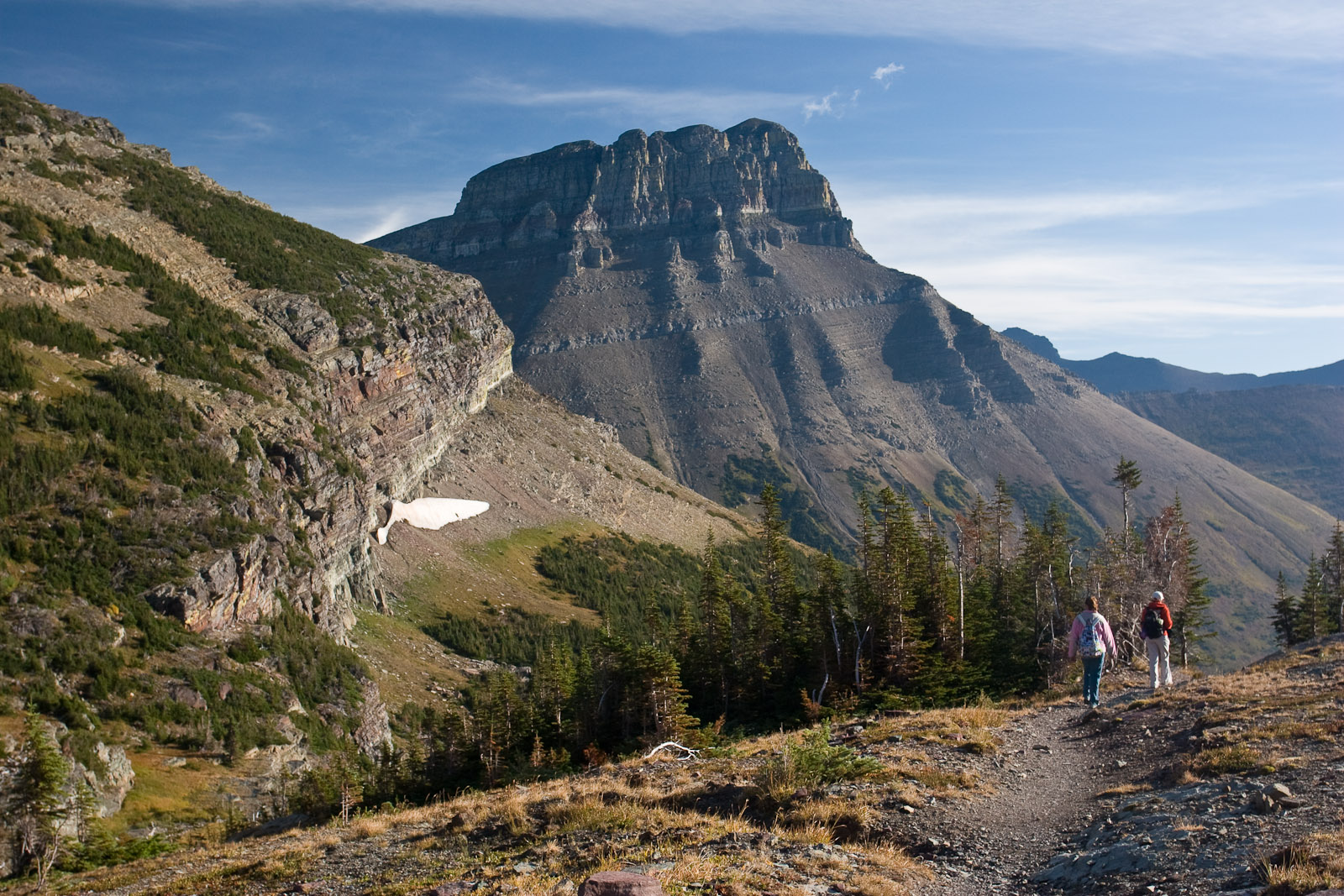
South aspect from Swiftcurrent Pass

== See also ==
- List of mountains and mountain ranges of Glacier National Park (U.S.)
