= Swiftcurrent Lake =

Lake in Glacier County, Montana, U.S.

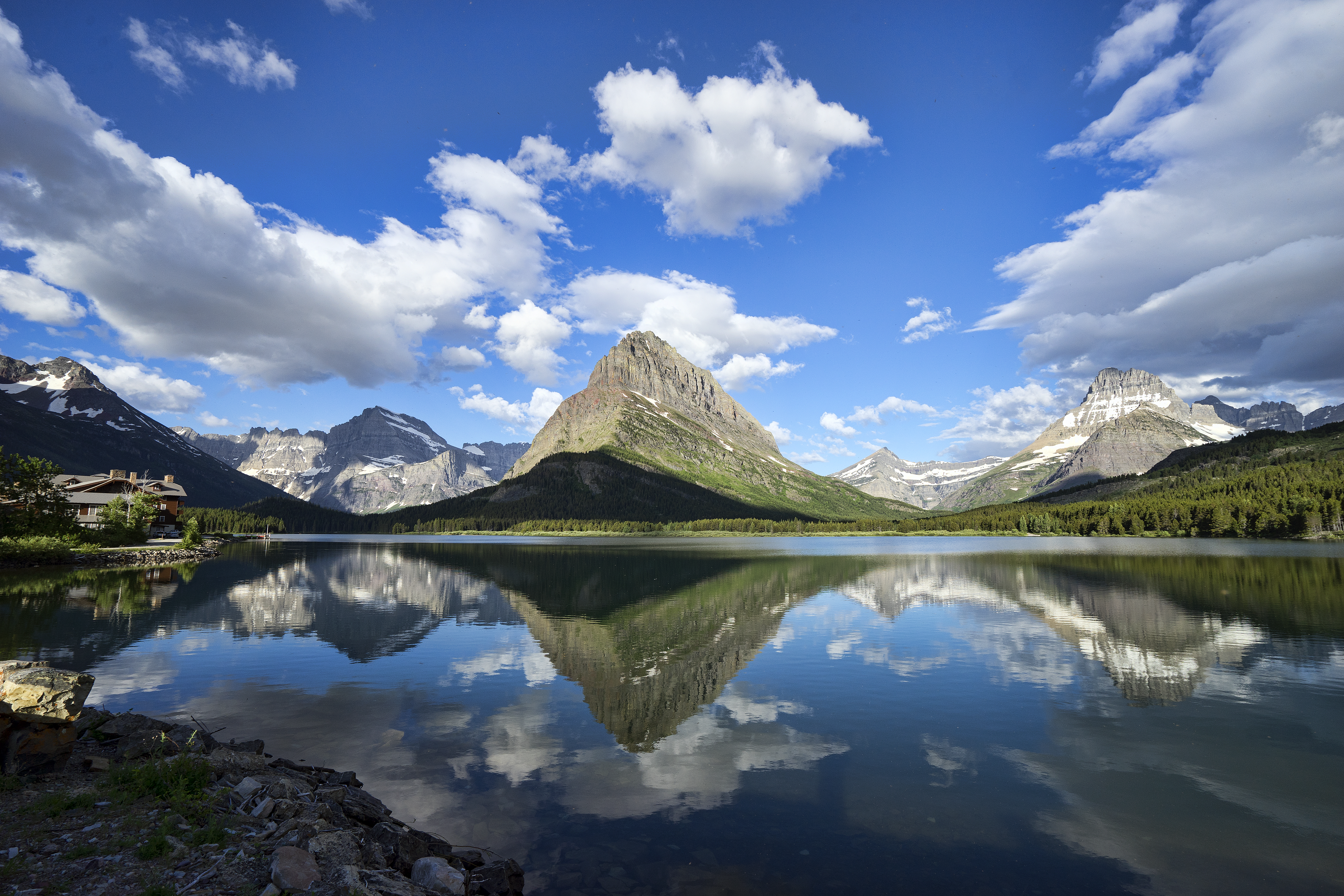
- Swiftcurrent Lake in Glacier National Park

- Location within Montana Location within the United States
- Location: Glacier National Park (U.S.), Glacier County, Montana, United States
- Coordinates: 48°47′43″N 113°39′41″W
- Type: Natural
- Basin countries: United States
- Max. length: 1 mi (1.6 km)
- Max. width: .5 mi (0.80 km)
- Max. depth: 30 ft (9.1 m)
- Surface elevation: 4,878 ft (1,487 m)

Swiftcurrent Lake is located in the Many Glacier region of Glacier National Park, in the U.S. state of Montana. The Many Glacier Hotel, the largest hotel in the park, is along the east shore of the lake. Many hiking trails originate from the area and scenic tour boats provide access to the lake for visitors.

Swiftcurrent Lake lies at 4,878 feet (1,487 m) above sea level. Nearby lakes include the much larger Lake Sherburne to the east and Lake Josephine to the immediate southwest. The mountains immediately west of the lake rise 3,000 feet (910 m) above the lake. The fast disappearing Grinnell Glacier is one of several glaciers and snowfields that provide water for the streams that replenish the lake. Mount Gould, Grinnell Point and Mount Wilbur are the largest mountains immediately west of the lake. It consists of two basins, each between 15 feet (4.6 m) and 30 feet (9.1 m) in depth.

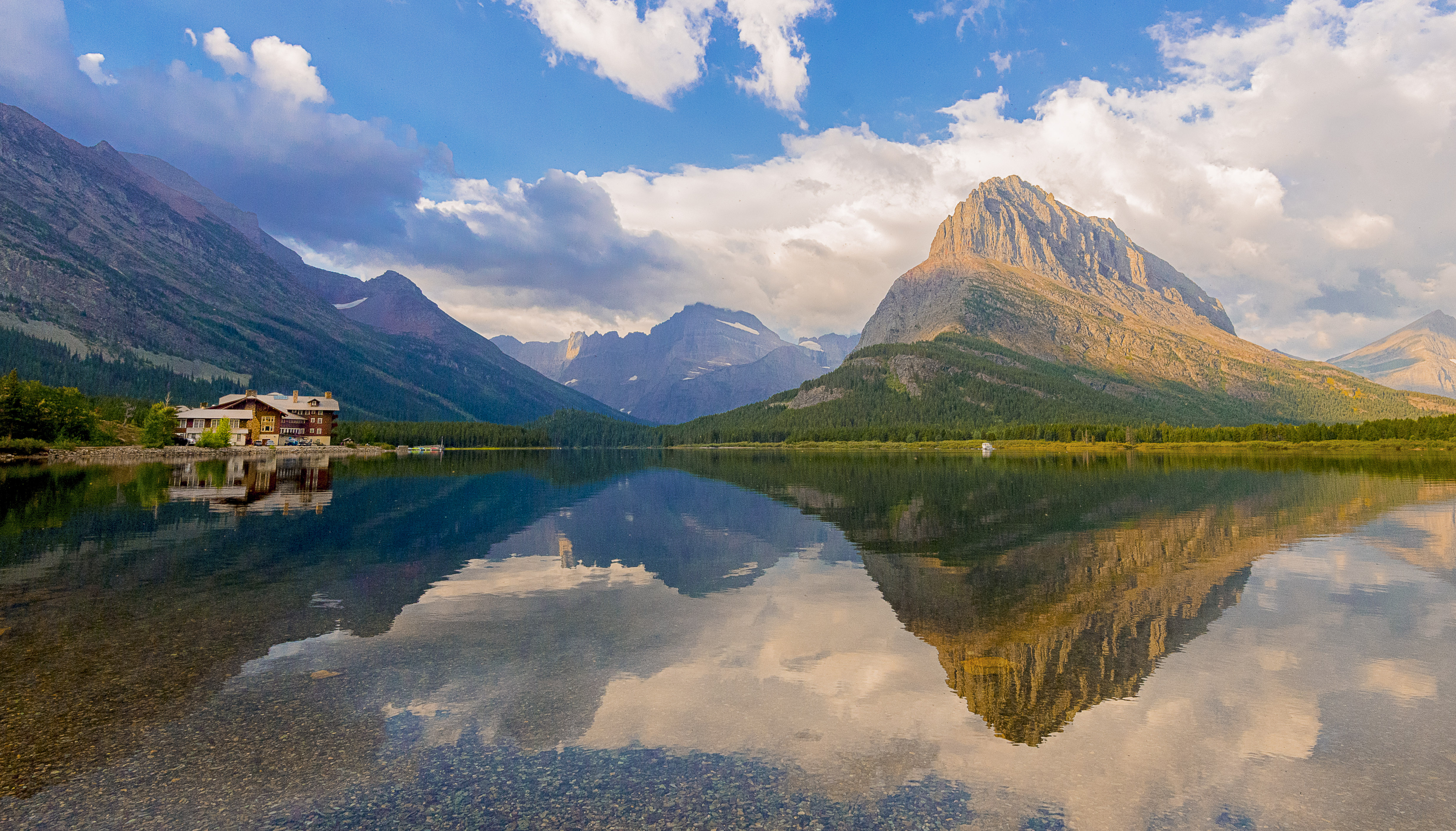
Lake with Many Glacier Hotel on the left

== See also ==
- Media related to Swiftcurrent Lake at Wikimedia Commons
- List of lakes in Glacier County, Montana
