= Nyack Mountain =

Mountain in Montana, United States

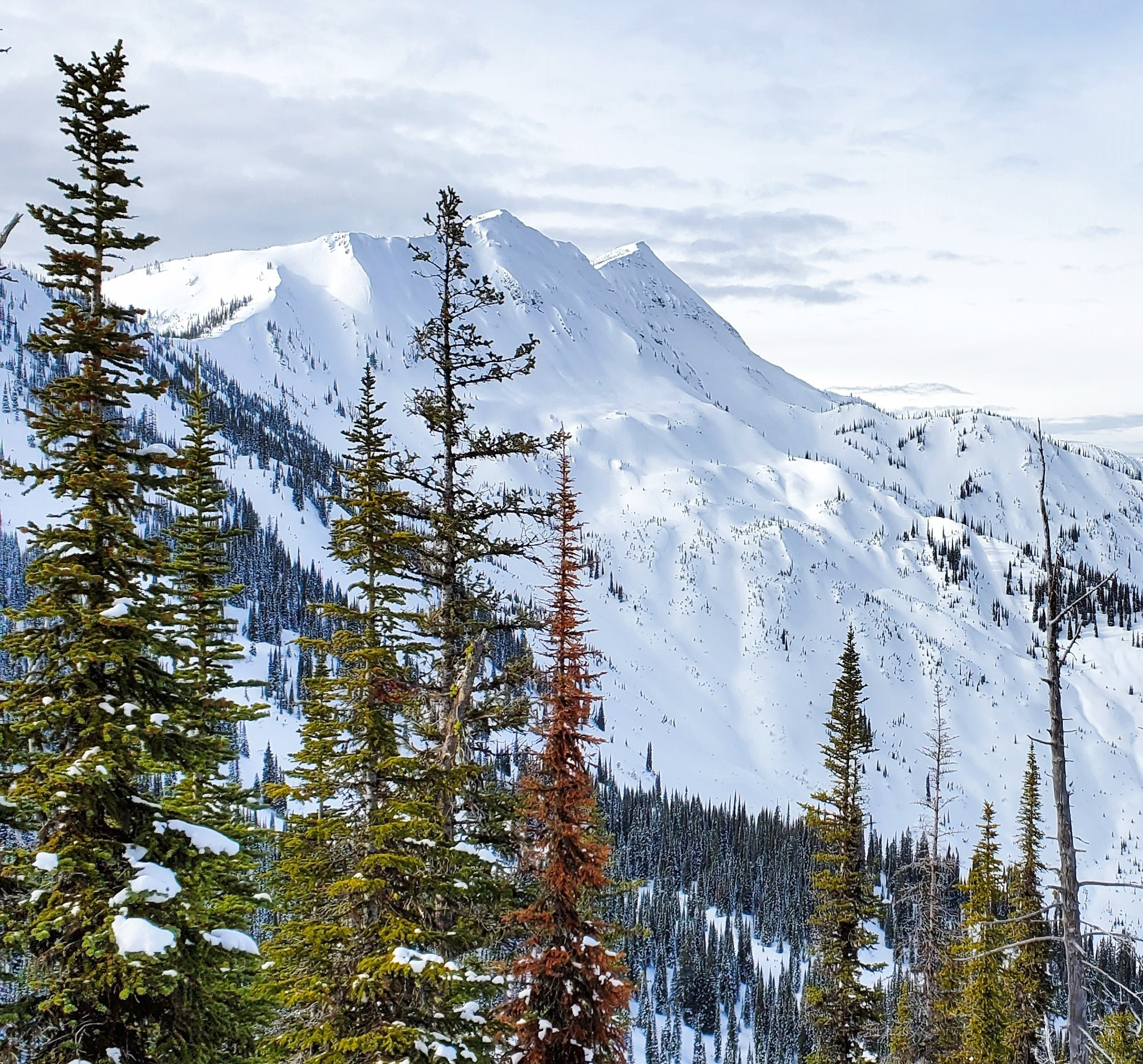
- East aspect in winter

Highest point
- Elevation: 7,750 ft (2,362 m)
- Prominence: 890 ft (271 m)
- Parent peak: Great Northern Mountain
- Isolation: 1.39 mi (2.24 km)
- Coordinates: 48°23′45″N 113°48′56″W

Geography
- Location within Montana Location within the United States
- Country: United States
- State: Montana
- County: Flathead
- Protected area: Great Bear Wilderness
- Parent range: Flathead Range; Rocky Mountains
- Topo map: USGS Nyack

Nyack Mountain is a 7,750-foot-elevation (2,362-meter) mountain summit located in Flathead County, Montana, United States.

== Description ==
Nyack Mountain is situated west of the Continental Divide in the Flathead Range. It is the 27th-highest point in the Great Bear Wilderness which is managed by the Flathead National Forest. The nearest higher neighbor is Mount Penrose, 1.38 mile to the northwest. Precipitation runoff from the mountain's east slope drains to the Middle Fork Flathead River, whereas the west slope drains to Hungry Horse Reservoir. Topographic relief is significant as the summit rises 3,350 feet (1,020 meters) above the Middle Fork Flathead Valley in 2.25 miles (3.62 km). Nyack Mountain rises three miles south of Nyack, Montana, an unincorporated place along Highway 2. This mountain's toponym has been officially adopted by the United States Board on Geographic Names.

== Climate ==
According to the Köppen climate classification system, the mountain is located in an alpine subarctic climate zone with long, cold, snowy winters, and cool to warm summers. Winter temperatures can drop below 0 °F with wind chill factors below −10 °F. Due to its altitude, it receives precipitation all year, as snow in winter and as thunderstorms in summer.

== See also ==
- Geology of the Rocky Mountains
