= Mount Grant (Montana) =

Mountain in Montana, United States

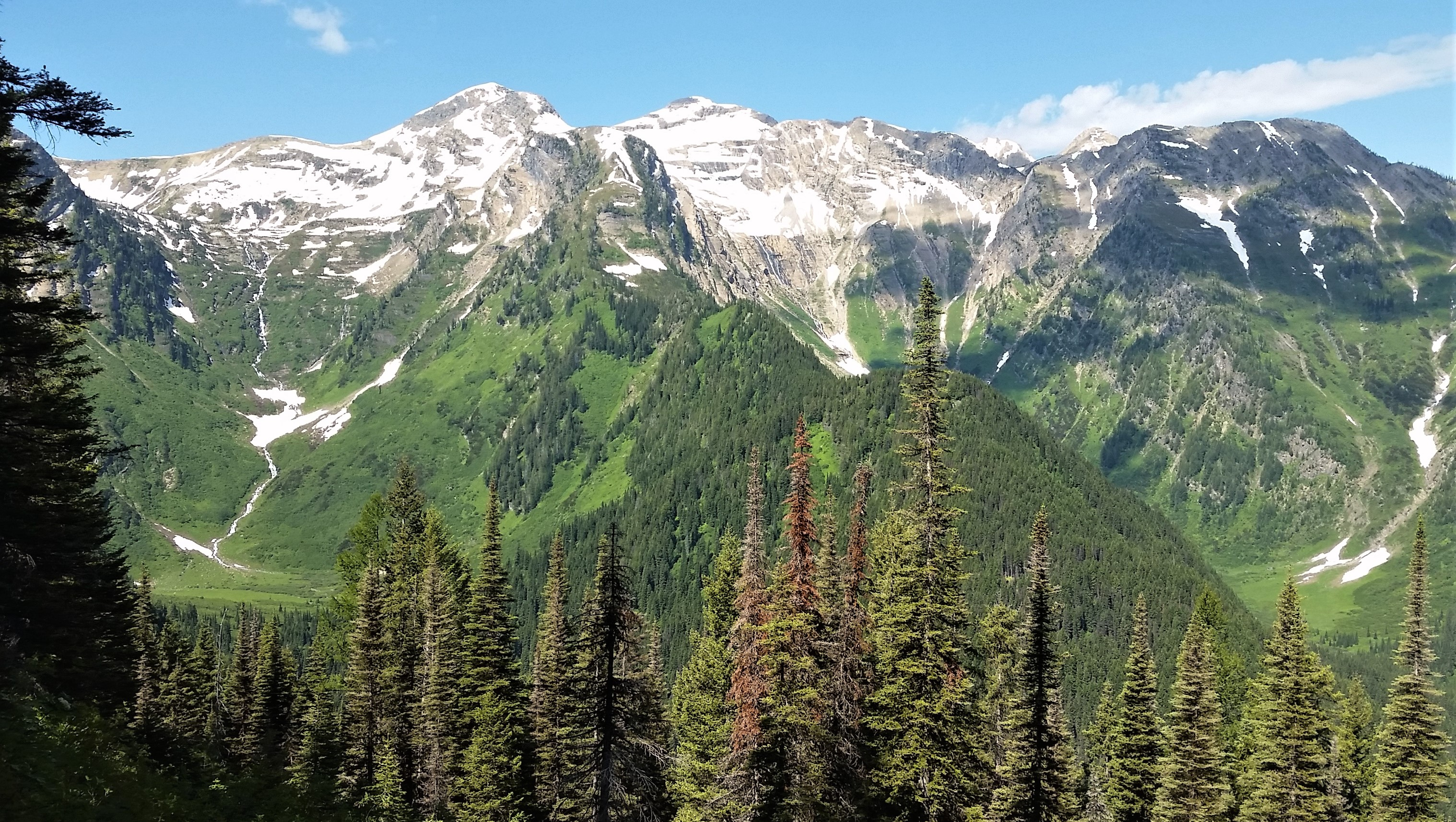
- East aspect

Highest point
- Elevation: 8,590 ft (2,618 m)
- Prominence: 670 ft (204 m)
- Parent peak: Great Northern Mountain (8,705 ft)
- Isolation: 1.24 mi (2.00 km)
- Coordinates: 48°19′29″N 113°45′21″W

Geography
- Location within Montana Location within the United States
- Location: Flathead County, Montana, US
- Parent range: Flathead Range; Rocky Mountains
- Topo map: USGS Mount Grant

Mount Grant is an 8,590-foot-elevation (2,620-meter) mountain summit located in Flathead County in the U.S. state of Montana.

== Description ==
Mount Grant is situated in the Great Bear Wilderness on land managed by Flathead National Forest. Mount Grant is in the Flathead Range, west of the Continental Divide, and the nearest higher peak is Great Northern Mountain, one mile to the northwest. Topographic relief is significant as the west aspect rises 5,030 feet (1,530 meters) above Hungry Horse Reservoir in four miles, and the east aspect rises the same in five miles above the Middle Fork Flathead Valley. Precipitation runoff from the mountain drains east into Tunnel Creek, which is a tributary of Middle Fork Flathead River, and the west slope drains to Hungry Horse Reservoir.

== Climate ==
According to the Köppen climate classification system, the mountain is located in an alpine subarctic climate zone with long, cold, snowy winters, and cool to warm summers. This climate supports the Grant Glacier on the east slope. Winter temperatures can drop below −10 °F with wind chill factors below −30 °F. Due to its altitude, it receives precipitation all year, as snow in winter, and as thunderstorms in summer.

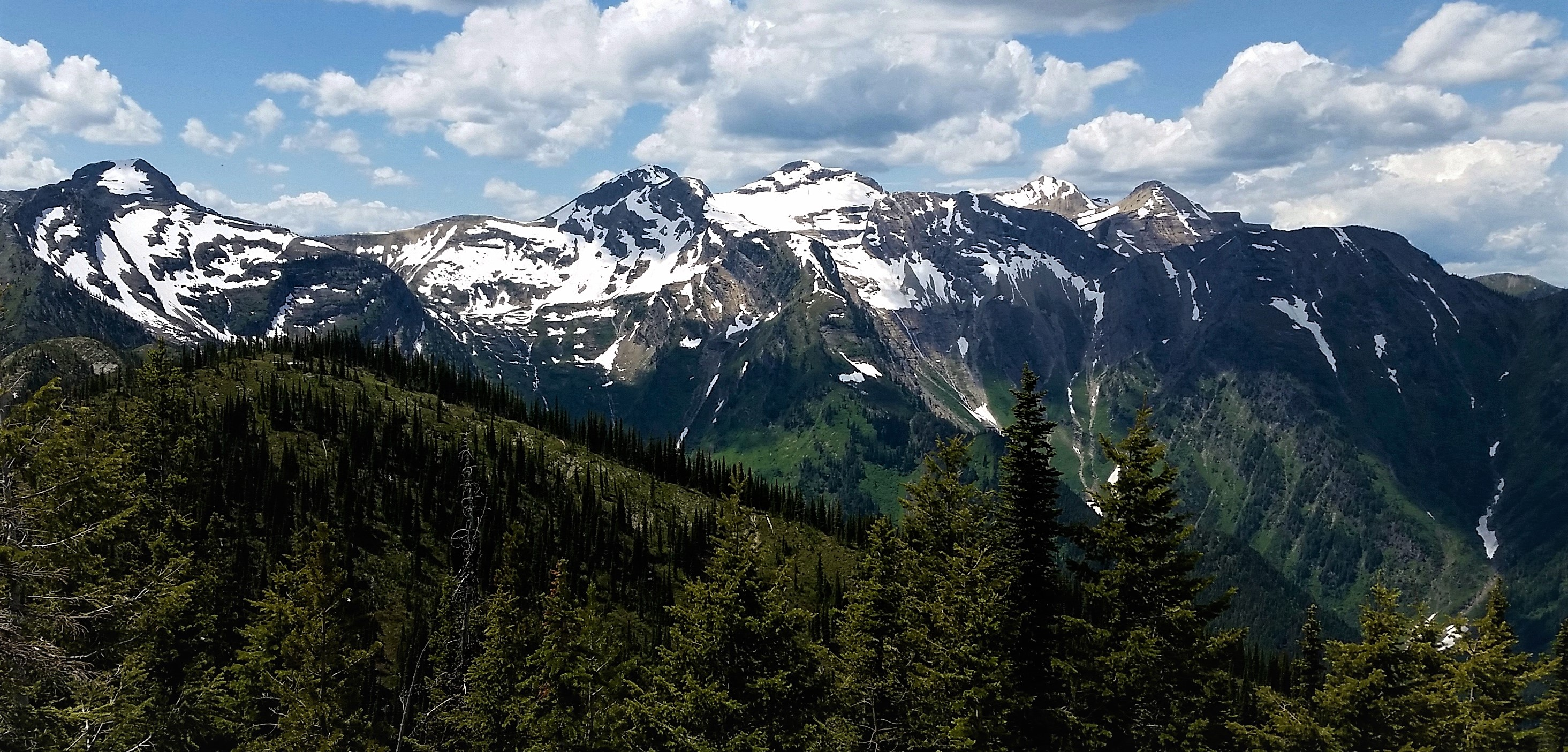
East aspect of Mount Grant centered. Mount Liebig to left, and the top of Great Northern Mountain visible to right.

== See also ==
- Geology of the Rocky Mountains
