= Deans Creek =

Deans Creek may refer to the following:

- Deans Creek (Marshall Creek tributary), a river in California
- Deans Creek, a cove on Deer Island, New Brunswick
- Deans Creek (Oriskany Creek tributary), a river in New York
- Deans Creek (Carolina Creek tributary), a river in Texas

== See also ==
- Dean Creek (disambiguation)
