= Pentagon Mountain =

Mountain in Montana, United States

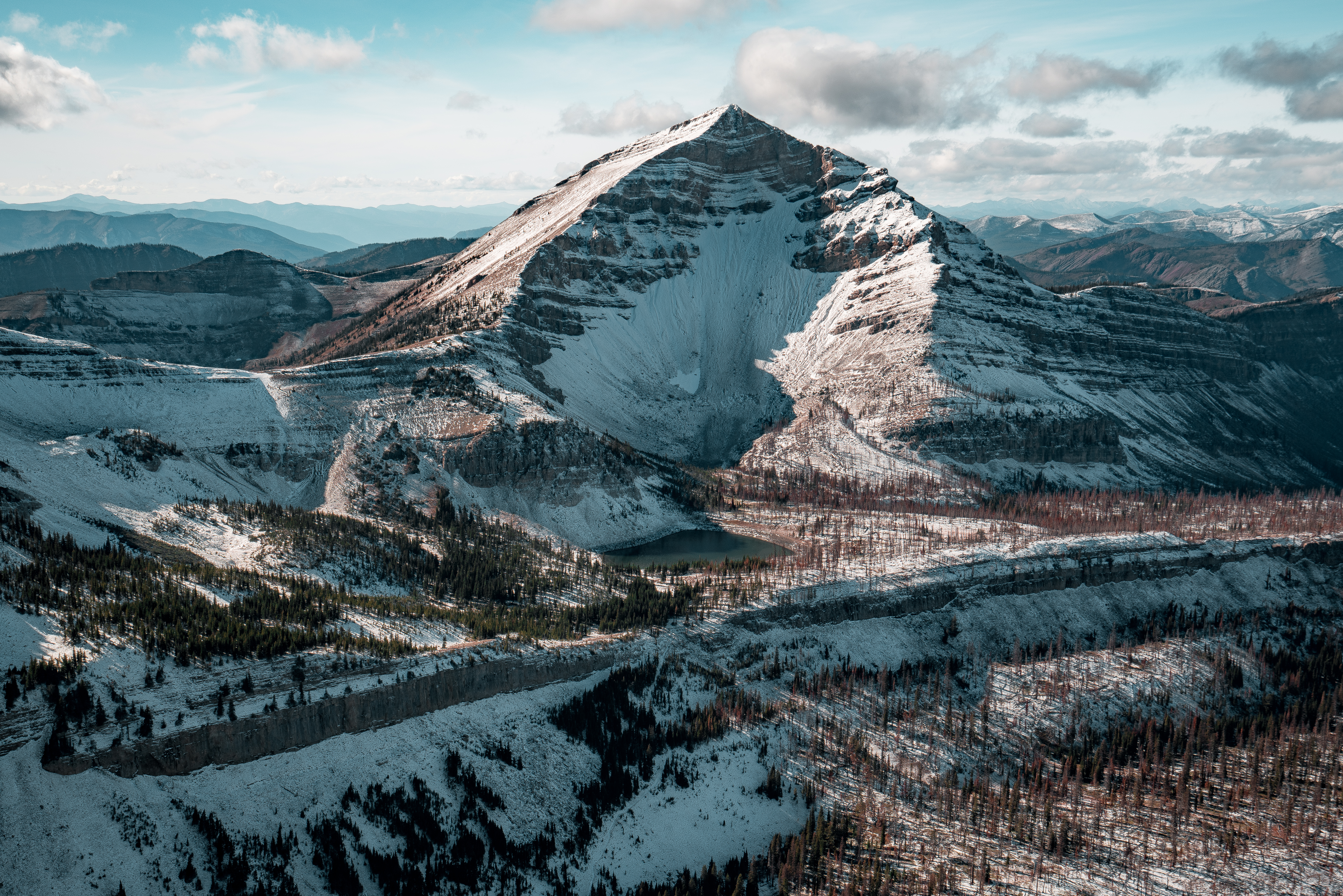
- Aerial view of east aspect

Highest point
- Elevation: 8,873 ft (2,704 m)
- Prominence: 1,353 ft (412 m)
- Parent peak: Three Sisters, North (8,900 ft)
- Isolation: 10.86 mi (17.48 km)
- Coordinates: 47°55′38″N 113°07′29″W

Geography
- Location within Montana Location within the United States
- Location: Flathead County, Montana, U.S.
- Parent range: Rocky Mountains; Flathead Range; Trilobite Range
- Topo map: USGS Pentagon Mountain

Geology
- Rock age: Precambrian
- Rock type: Sedimentary rock

Pentagon Mountain is an 8,873-foot (2,704-metre) mountain summit located in Flathead County of the U.S. state of Montana.

== Description ==
Pentagon Mountain is the highest point in the Trilobite Range, which is a subset of the Flathead Range. It is set within the Bob Marshall Wilderness, on land managed by Flathead National Forest. It is situated two miles west of the Continental Divide, and topographic relief is significant as the summit rises approximately 3,000 feet (910 meters) above Pentagon Creek in approximately one mile. Precipitation runoff from the mountain drains west and south to the Spotted Bear River via Pentagon Creek, and north to the Middle Fork Flathead River via Clack Creek. The nearest higher neighbor is Three Sisters, 10.56 miles (16.99 km) to the south.

== Climate ==
Based on the Köppen climate classification, Pentagon Mountain is located in a subarctic climate zone characterized by long, usually very cold winters, and short, cool to mild summers. Winter temperatures can drop below −10 °F with wind chill factors below −30 °F.

== Geology ==
Pentagon Mountain is composed of sedimentary rock laid down during the Precambrian to Jurassic periods. Formed in shallow seas, this sedimentary rock was initially uplifted beginning 170 million years ago when the Lewis Overthrust fault pushed an enormous slab of precambrian rocks 3 mi (4.8 km) thick, 50 miles (80 km) wide and 160 miles (260 km) long over younger rock of the cretaceous period.

== Gallery ==
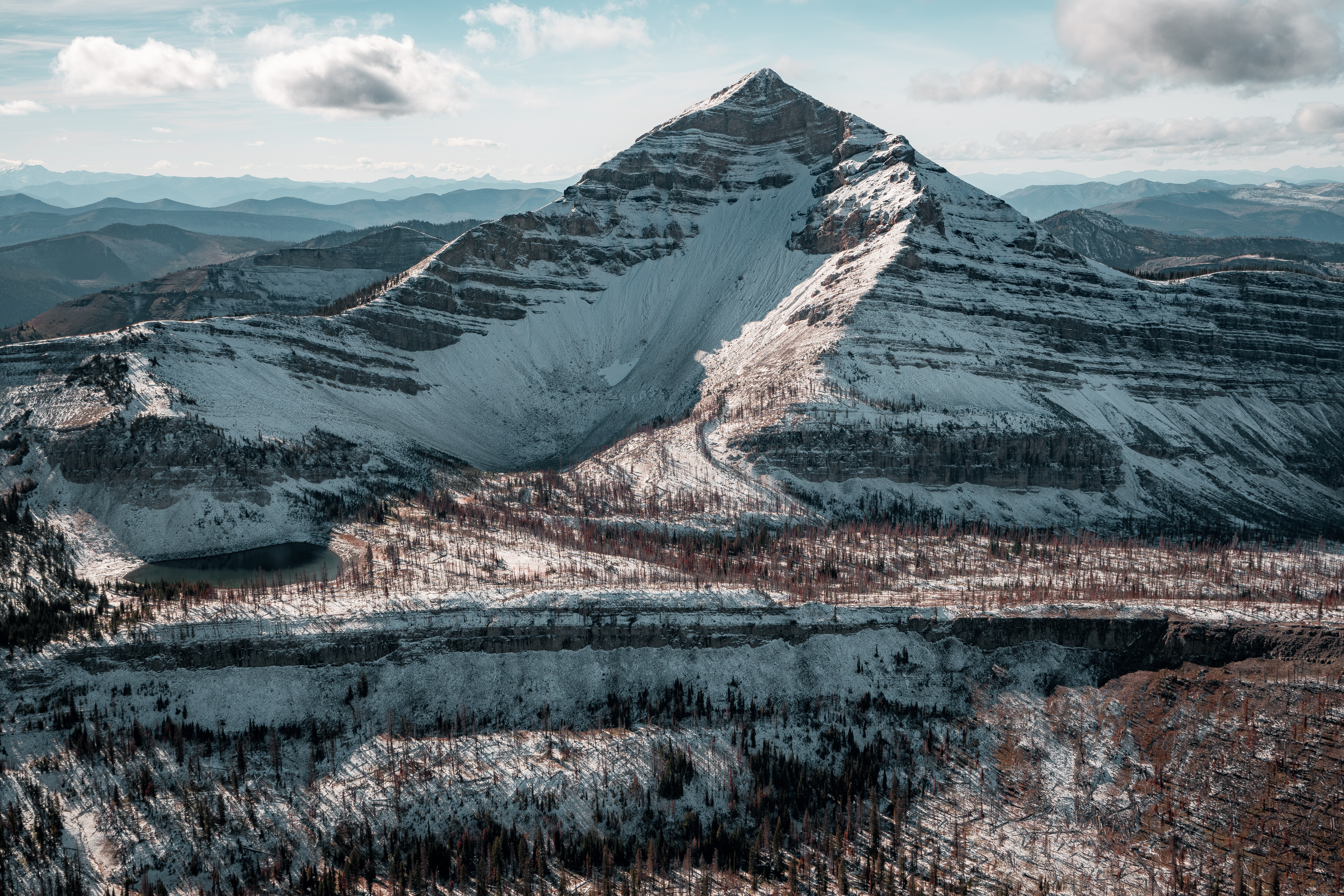
Aerial of east aspect, Dean Lake to left.

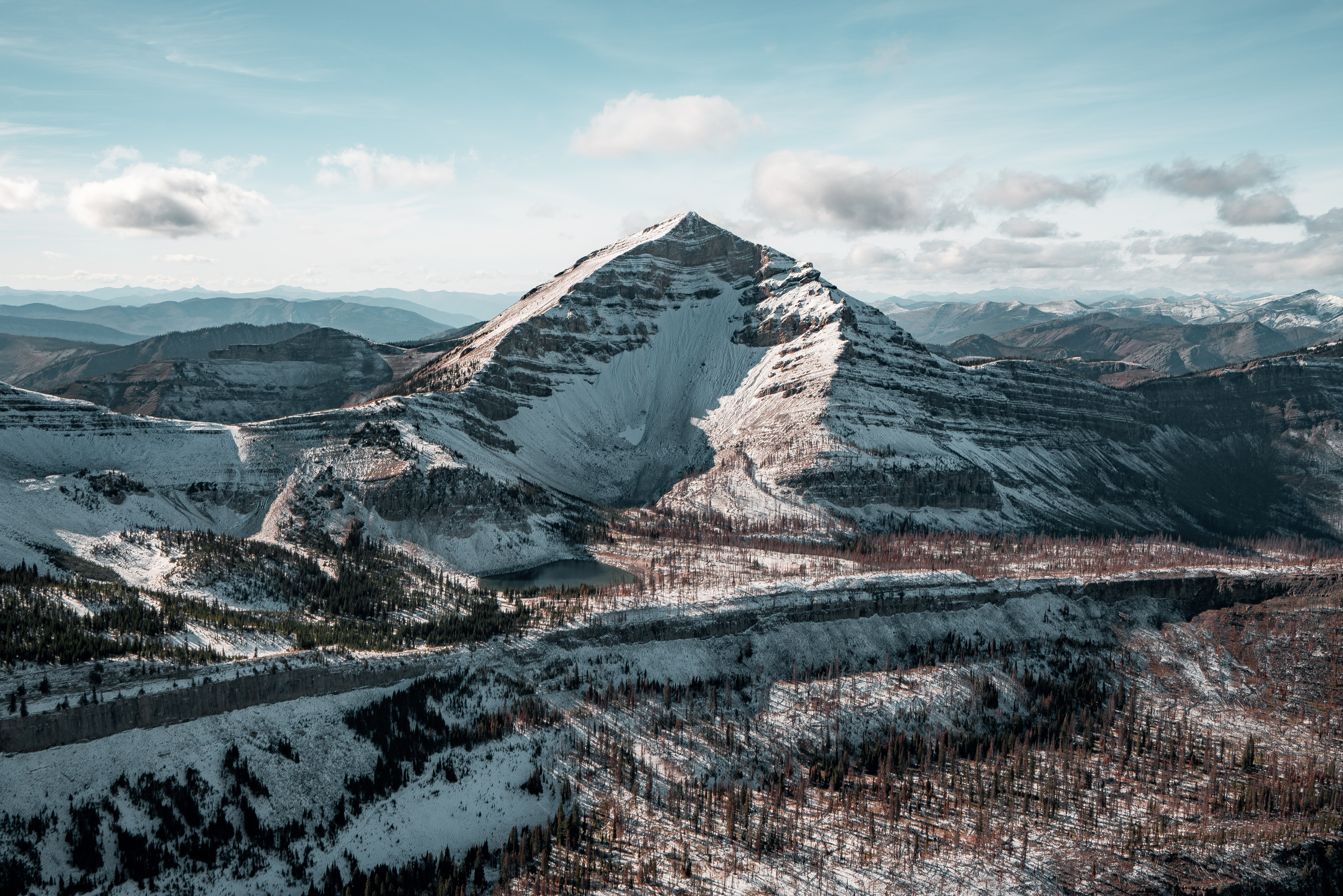

== See also ==
- Geology of the Rocky Mountains
