= Wild Montana =

Non-profit organisation in the USA

- Formation: March 28, 1958; 68 years ago
- Founder: Ken and Florence Baldwin
- Type: Nonprofit
- Tax ID no.: 51-0198932
- Legal status: 501(c)(3)
- Purpose: Conservation
- Headquarters: Helena, Montana
- Board President: Tim Lynch
- Executive Director: John Todd
- Board of directors: Tim Lynch; Debo Powers; Larry Epstein; Andrew McKean; Mark Connell; Camille Consolvo; Shane Doyle; Jeanette Hall; Patrick Holmes; Kate Kendall; Lauren Murray; Tom Ross; Robin Saha
- Website: https://wildmontana.org/
- Formerly called: Montana Wilderness Association

Wild Montana (formerly Montana Wilderness Association) is a grassroots conservation organization founded by a group of Montana outfitters, ranchers, doctors, and friends. The organization is governed by a board of directors from across Montana, working at the local level through seven chapters in Helena, Bozeman, Missoula, Whitefish, Great Falls, Billings, and Butte. Each chapter is governed by a local board of directors. Since 1958, Wild Montana has worked to protect Montana's wilderness, wildlife habitat, and traditional recreation opportunities. The organization was instrumental in the passage of the 1964 Wilderness Act and in the designation of every Wilderness area in the state, like the Bob Marshall, Scapegoat, and Absaroka-Beartooth Wildernesses. It also helped win National Wild and Scenic Rivers System designations for the Missouri and Flathead rivers, and National Monument status for the Upper Missouri River Breaks.

== Origin ==
Wild Montana was founded in 1958, originally named Montana Wilderness Association, by Ken and Florence Baldwin. The grassroots organization's mission was and is to preserve wilderness and influence policy on public land management. Wild Montana began as a group of individuals sharing the goal of protecting the heritage of Montana's wildlands and securing the proper management of public lands. The group was inspired by similar wilderness-oriented individuals and associations around the nation at the time. John Muir had recently founded the Sierra Club and was very active in protecting Yosemite; Aldo Leopold wrote about the ethics involved in conservation and was a co-founder of the Wilderness Society; Bob Marshall wrote several essays about conservation in forestry publications and was also a founder of the Wilderness Society. Wild Montana is the nation's premiere Wilderness grassroots organization and was significantly influential in the passing of the Wilderness Act by Lyndon B. Johnson in 1964. With the passing of this Act came the designation of the first Wilderness areas: The Bob Marshall Wilderness Complex, Cabinet Mountains, the Gates of the Mountains, the Selway-Bitterroot Wilderness, and Anaconda-Pintler Wilderness.

== Major campaigns ==
- Badger-Two Medicine: The 130,000-acre Badger-Two Medicine lies on Montana's Rocky Mountain Front, bounded on the north by Glacier National Park and the east by the Blackfeet Reservation. The Great Bear and Bob Marshall Wilderness Areas lie to the west and south. The Badger-Two Medicine is a designated Traditional Cultural District under the National Historic Preservation Act because of its significance to and ongoing use by the Blackfeet Nation. In June 2013, Mountain States Legal Foundation filed a lawsuit against the federal government on behalf of lessee Sidney Longwell of Solenex, LLC to lift the suspension on the Hall Creek lease. In response to the lawsuit and as a result of the incredible outpouring of support for the Badger-Two Medicine, Secretary of the Interior Sally Jewell cancelled Sidney Longwell's lease and two other illegally issued leases; however, Sidney Longwell and the Mountain States Legal Foundation – along with another former leaseholder, W.A. Moncrief Jr. – continue to challenge the cancellations in court and pursue their desire to drill in the Badger-Two Medicine. Wild Montana is working with the Blackfeet Nation to prevent drilling in the Badger-Two Medicine and permanently protect it.
- Blackfoot Clearwater Stewardship Project: On March 2, 2017, Senator Jon Tester introduced the Blackfoot Clearwater Stewardship Act, a grassroots proposal hammered out by the Blackfoot Clearwater Stewardship Project (BCSP), which would add 80,000 acres to the Bob Marshall, Scapegoat, and Mission Mountains Wilderness Areas and forever safeguard Grizzly Basin, Monture Creek, the North Fork of the Blackfoot River, and the West Fork of the Clearwater. The BCSP is a coalition of local loggers, ranchers, outfitters, conservationists, snowmobilers, business owners, and outdoor recreationists in the Ovando and Seeley Lake area. Wild Montana is a member of the BCSP. Permanent protection of the Blackfoot River's most important tributaries will help preserve the health of the entire Blackfoot River watershed, as explained in a five-minute film Wild Montana produced called "Hallowed Waters: The Legacy and Lifeblood of the Big Blackfoot". Wild Montana is encouraging Senator Jon Tester to reintroduce the bill in 2019, and is also asking Senator Steve Daines and Congressman Greg Gianforte to support the bill.
- Custer Gallatin National Forest: The Custer Gallatin National Forest, which includes the Gallatin Range, recently began the process of revising its forest management plan, which will determine how these lands are managed for the next 15 to 20 years. Congress designated the Hyalite-Porcupine-Buffalo Horn Wilderness Study Area in 1977, but Bozeman, Belgrade, and Big Sky have nearly tripled in size since then. In 2016, Wild Montana joined a diverse group of stakeholders called the Gallatin Forest Partnership (GFP), which is committed to crafting recommendations for the Custer Gallatin National Forest management plan revision.
- Lewistown area: In May 2019, the Bureau of Land Management released the second version of a resource management plan (RMP) draft directing how the agency's Lewistown Field Office will manage 650,000 surface acres of public lands in central Montana over the next 20 to 30 years. The Lewistown area is also known as "the wild heart of Montana", because it is one of America's last and largest intact prairie ecosystems, supporting one of the most productive populations of ungulates in North America and a thriving host of grassland bird species. The preferred management option United States Department of the Interior presented in the draft RMP would protect none of this area, and instead would open up almost all of it to oil and gas development and other uses that would diminish the wild character, and wildlife habitat. Wild Montana is encouraging Montanans to comment on the RMP.

== Programs ==
- Wild Montana offers Wilderness Walks each summer so members and the public can explore new trails and meet new people. Free hikes, field trips, backpacking adventures, and snowshoe outings are led by experienced volunteers.
- The Volunteer Trail Crew program allows members and the public to assist land management agencies across the state through boots-on-the-ground service. Typical project work includes constructing new trails, signage installations, "logging out" or opening trails for the season, and maintaining existing trails.
- Wild Montana maintains hikewildmontana.org, an online hiking guide, with information about trails around the state, nearby restaurants, and descriptions of hikes.
- Get Out the Vote: in 2018 Wild Montana created the Public Lands in Public Hands campaign to keep America's public lands from being transferred to individual states and sold off to private interests and to build public support for the protection and expansion of Montana's outdoor way of life. Of pledges collected, 55 percent came from 18 to 24-year-olds, 19 percent came from 25 to 34-year-olds, and 26 percent came from Montanans 35 and older.

== Highlights ==
1958 – Ken and Florence Baldwin found Montana Wilderness Association (now Wild Montana). Wild Montana was the nation's first state organization centered on protecting wilderness and the proper management of public lands.

1960 – Wilderness Walks begin in the summer of 1960 when Wild Montana founders Ken and Florence Baldwin lead 14 hikers into the Crazy Mountains. Inspired by the positive feedback they received the next year, they set out with a group of 40 hikers to Table Mountain in the Spanish Peaks. As Wilderness Walks grew in popularity, Ken and Florence continued to lead walks around the Bozeman area and began recruiting other wildland enthusiasts to help lead hikes across the state. Wilderness Walks continue today.

1964 – President Lyndon B. Johnson signs Wilderness Act, creating Wilderness Areas in Montana: such as the Bob Marshall Wilderness, Cabinet Mountains, the Gates of the Mountains, the Selway-Bitterroot Wilderness, and Anaconda-Pintler Wilderness.

1972 – Congress designates the Lincoln-Scapegoat Wilderness as proposed by Wild Montana members. This marks the first time an area is recommended by someone other than the U.S. Forest Service. Because Wild Montana activists proposed the idea, this wilderness is also known as the "first citizen's wilderness".

1975-1980 – Wild Montana members secure designations for the Great Bear, Rattlesnake, Absaroka-Beartooth, Mission Mountains, Welcome Creek, UL Bend, Medicine Lake, and Red Rock Lakes areas.

1981 – Along with other conservation groups, Wild Montana members counterattack the "Bomb the Bob" attack, a plan to retrieve oil and gas from the Bob Marshall Wilderness. "The Bob" is the most ecologically complete mountain wilderness in the country, with rugged peaks, big river valleys, lakes, large meadows and extensive coniferous forests. There are more than 100 lakes in the wilderness and major streams have their beginning there including the blue ribbon South Fork Flathead. The Bob is the last great stronghold of the silvertip grizzly and is home to every species of mammal indigenous to the Northern Rockies except for Plains Bison.

1983 – The Lee Metcalf Wilderness is designated. This Wilderness Area is an important component of the Greater Yellowstone Ecosystem and is crucial grizzly habitat.

1988 – The last Wilderness bill passes United States Congress, but President Reagan pocket-vetoes the bill as a favor to elect Senator Conrad Burns.

1990 – Wild Montana leads the Kootenai and Lolo National Forest Accords. Spearheaded by John Gatchell, the Accords brought together conservationists and sawmill workers in support of the preservation of huge swathes of roadless land in northwestern Montana. A corresponding bill identifying Wilderness and timberland is introduced in 1991 by Montana Senator Max Baucus, but doesn't make it through Congress.

1994 – Wild Montana members lead an attempt at another Wilderness bill. Montana representative led the way and the bill passed in the House. Conversely, neither senator supported the bill and it was not considered in the Senate. Democrat Max Baucus and Republican Conrad Burns were senators at this time.

2003 – Members again lead an act to protect Wilderness Study Areas. The United States Court of Appeals for the Ninth Circuit states that the United States Forest Service has a legal obligation to keep the wild character of seven wilderness study areas in Montana. The Lewis and Clark National Forest proposes a controversial Rocky Mountain Front Travel Plan which would allow motorized travel in the area. In response, Wild Montana helped generate, tally, and analyze 7,600 comments on the plan, causing the Forest Service to scrap it.

2007 – Wild Montana participates in the Blackfoot Cooperative Landscape Stewardship Pilot Project, a plan that added 87,000 acres (350 km^{2}) to the Bob Marshal/Scapegoat/Mission Mountains Wilderness complex.

2005-2008 – Snowmobilers and wilderness advocates in Seeley Lake agree to a proposal that added more wilderness in exchange for an established winter recreation area. By 2008, the group reaches consensus on a suite of forest management goals, including the addition of 80,000 acres to the Mission Mountains, Scapegoat Wilderness, and Bob Marshall Wilderness Areas, a move that would safeguard the West Fork of the Clearwater River (a stream crucial for bull trout) and the wildlife-rich slopes of the Swan Range above Seeley Lake.

2012 – Wild Montana begins its Volunteer Trail Crew program to keep trails up to standard for public use and enjoyment, as well as begins encouraging Montana citizens to sign a pledge card to vote for public lands.

2014 – The Rocky Mountain Front Heritage Act, crafted by a local coalition of ranchers, outfitters, Wild Montana staff, and other Montana conservationists, passes at the end of 2014, breaking a 31-year Wilderness drought in Montana and adding 67,000 acres to the Bob Marshall Wilderness Complex.

2016 – Local members of the Blackfoot Clearwater Stewardship Project (BCSP) reach an agreement with the International Mountain Bicycling Association, the Montana Mountain Biking Alliance, and local mountain biking club MTB Missoula on the BCSP's legislative proposal. The agreement would ensure new backcountry cycling opportunities while continuing to protect secure habitat and free-flowing headwaters.

2013-2019 – In 2013, Mountain States Legal Foundation files a lawsuit against the federal government on behalf of lessee Sidney Longwell of Solenex, LLC to lift the suspension on the Hall Creek lease. Secretary of the Interior Sally Jewell cancels Sidney Longwell's lease and two other illegally issued leases, but Sidney Longwell and the Mountain States Legal Foundation – along with another former leaseholder, W.A. Moncrief Jr. – continue to challenge the cancellations in court and pursue their desire to drill in the Badger-Two Medicine. In March 2016, the Department of the Interior (DOI) cancels the Solenex lease and, in January 2017, cancels the final two leases. On November 16, 2016, the largest leaseholder, Devon Energy, agrees to voluntarily relinquish its 15 leases. In September 2017, Washington, D.C. District Court Judge Richard Leon rules in favor of Solenex and Moncrief and reinstates their leases, arguing the government had waited too long to cancel the leases. In 2019, DOI announces it will not defend its own cancellation of one of two leases remaining in the Badger-Two Medicine.

2021 – On June 3, 2021, Wild Montana announced that the organization was embarking on a new era with a new name: Wild Montana. With the name change came a change to the organization's logo and mission statement – now "Uniting and mobilizing communities to keep Montana wild."

== Political activity ==
Wild Montana Action Fund funds the Montanans for Public Lands PAC.

== See also ==
- Biodiversity
- Conservation biology
- Ecology movement
- Ecology
- Environmental protection
- Environmentalism
- Habitat conservation
- Natural capital
- Natural environment
- Natural resource
- Renewable resource
- Sustainability
