= Dean Creek =

Dean Creek may refer to:

== Canada ==
- A tributary of the Winnipeg River in Ontario, Canada

== United States ==
- A tributary of the South Fork Eel River, north-central California
- A tributary of Mossy Creek, Crawford County, Georgia
- Dean Creek (Spotted Bear River tributary), a stream in Montana, US
- Dean Creek (Cayuga Lake tributary), a stream in New York, US
- Dean Creek, in Dean Creek Elk Viewing Area, Reedsport, Oregon

== See also ==
- Deans Creek (disambiguation)
