= Bob Marshall Wilderness =

Protected area in Montana, United States

- IUCN category Ib (wilderness area)
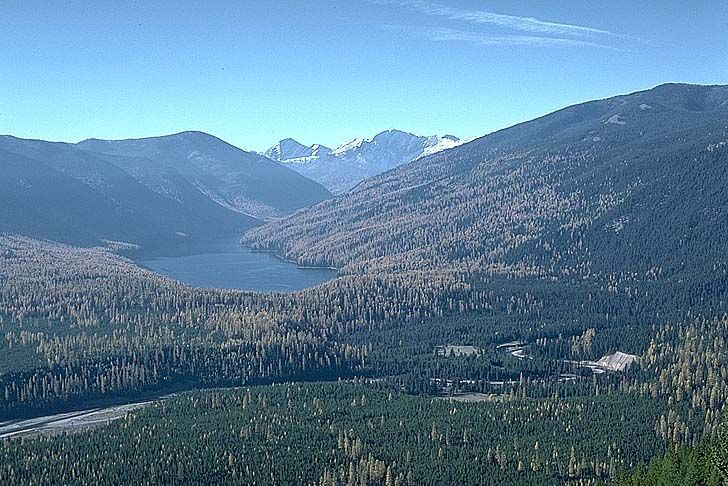

- Location within the United States
- Location: Montana, United States
- Nearest city: Kalispell, Montana
- Coordinates: 47°49′N 113°4′W
- Area: 1,009,364 acres (4,084.75 km^{2})
- Established: 1964
- Governing body: U.S. Forest Service

The Bob Marshall Wilderness Area is a congressionally-designated wilderness area located in Western Montana region of the United States. It is named after Bob Marshall (1901–1939), an early forester in the federal government, conservationist, and co-founder of The Wilderness Society. In the 1930s while working for the United States Forest Service, Marshall was largely responsible for designation of large areas to be preserved as roadless within lands administered by the Forest Service; he achieved this through promulgation of various regulations. Formally designated in 1964, the Bob Marshall Wilderness extends for 60 miles (97 km) along the Continental Divide and consists of 1,009,356 acres (4,084.72 km^{2}).

As directed by the Wilderness Act of 1964, "The Bob", as it is informally known, is to remain roadless. The only permanent structures throughout the area are a few old ranger stations and horse bridges. "The Bob" is the fifth-largest wilderness in the lower 48 states (after the Death Valley Wilderness, Frank Church–River of No Return Wilderness, Selway–Bitterroot Wilderness, and Marjory Stoneman Douglas Wilderness). The five ranger districts administering "The Bob" manage 1,856 miles (2,987 km) of trail that are open to foot and stock use only.

== Description ==
"The Bob", as it is known by locals and nicknamed by the U.S. Forest Service employees, ranges in altitudes of 4,000 to more than 9,000 feet (1,220 to 2750 m). A long escarpment known as the Chinese Wall averages 1,000 feet (300 m) high from its base and extends for 22 miles (35 km). With numerous waterfalls, lakes, and dense forests, the wilderness is prime Grizzly bear habitat; the U.S. Forest Service claims that the population density of this species is higher in "The Bob" than can be found anywhere else in the U.S. outside of the Greater Yellowstone Ecosystem or Alaska. The Bob is also home to many other large mammals, such as moose, elk, black bear, mountain goat, bighorn sheep, wolverine, cougar, Canadian lynx, and wolf. Bald eagles, osprey, pelican, and trumpeter swan are just a few of the bird species found. The dense old-growth forests are dominated by Douglas fir, larch, and spruce. Forest fires have changed large areas in the wilderness complex in recent years.

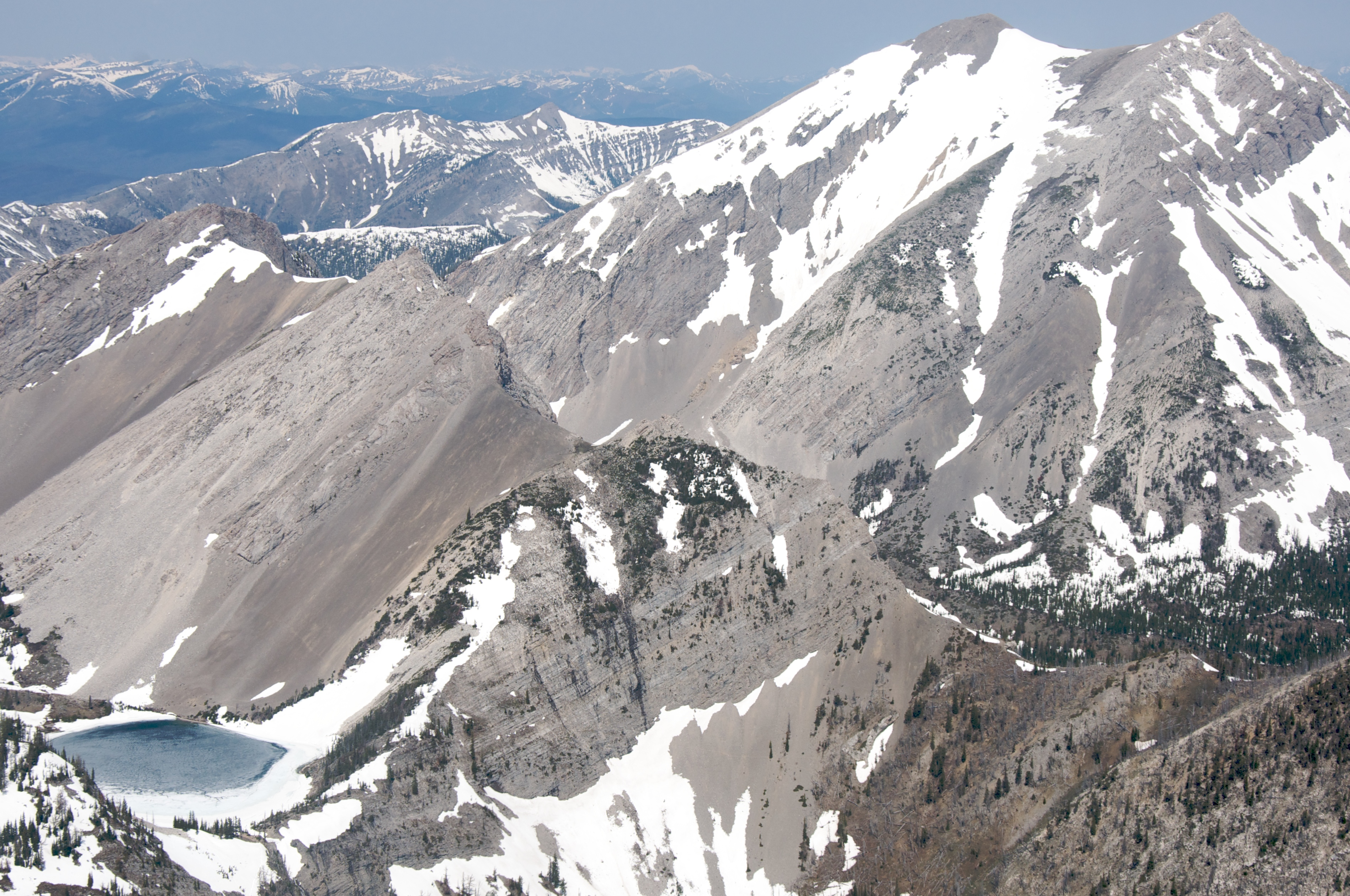
Mountains in the Bob Marshall Wilderness

Wilderness areas do not allow motorized or mechanical equipment, including bicycles and hang-gliders. Camping and fishing are allowed; fishing requires a state license. There are no roads and there is no logging or mining, in compliance with the Wilderness Act. Some administrative cabins constructed in the early 1920s afford refuge for trail crews and wilderness rangers. Wilderness areas within National Forests and Bureau of Land Management areas allow hunting in season.

== Surroundings ==
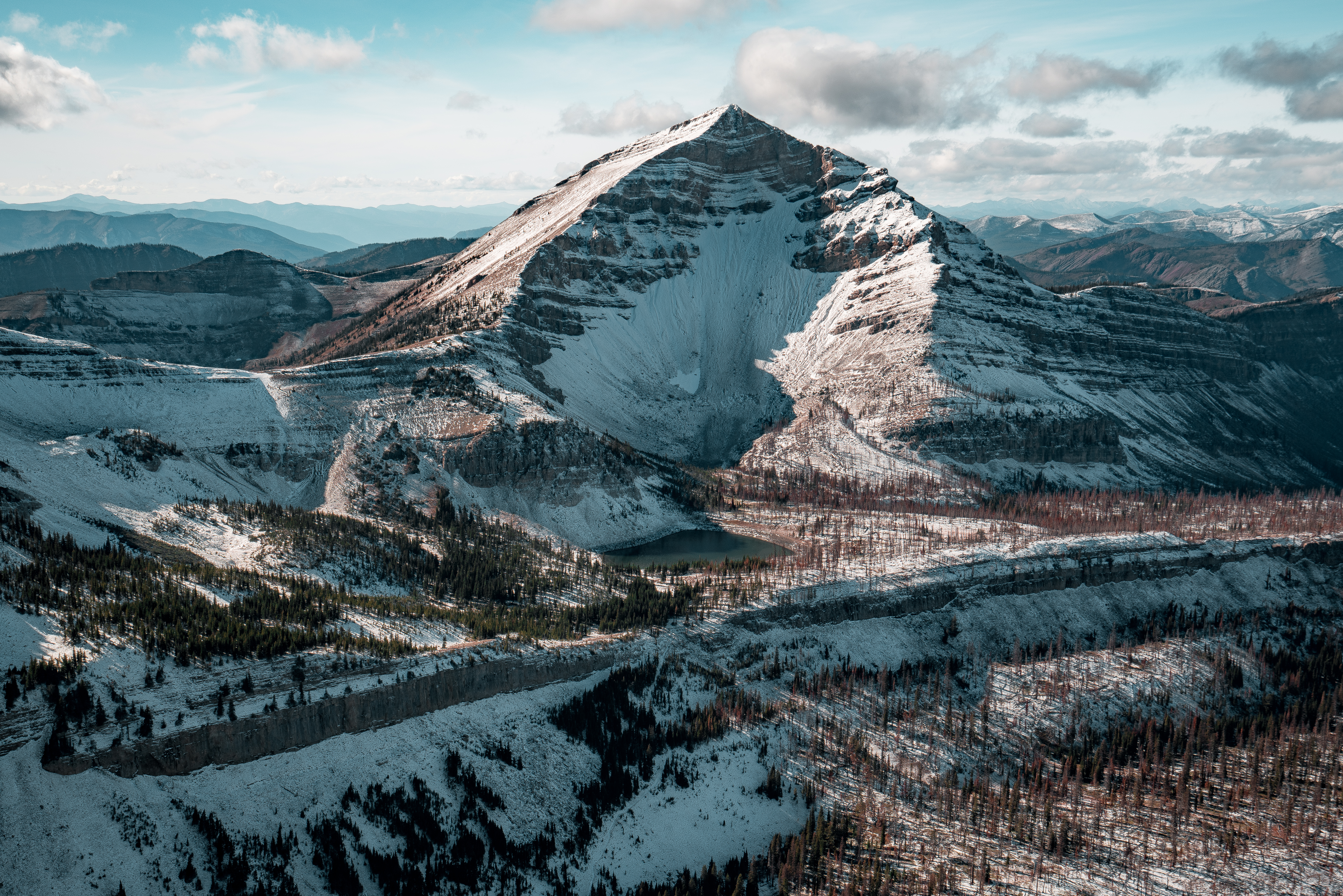
Pentagon Mountain in the Bob Marshall Wilderness

The wilderness, along with the adjoining Scapegoat and Great Bear wildernesses, make up the Bob Marshall Wilderness Complex, with components administered by the Lolo, Flathead, Helena, and Lewis and Clark National Forests, respectively. All three wildernesses total 1,535,352 acres (6,213.35 km^{2}).

The wilderness is located in parts of Flathead, Lewis and Clark, Powell, Teton, Missoula, and Pondera counties, and lies mostly within Flathead National Forest (70.3%) and partially within Lewis and Clark National Forest. The wilderness can be accessed by trails (via foot travel or on horseback) from surrounding roads.

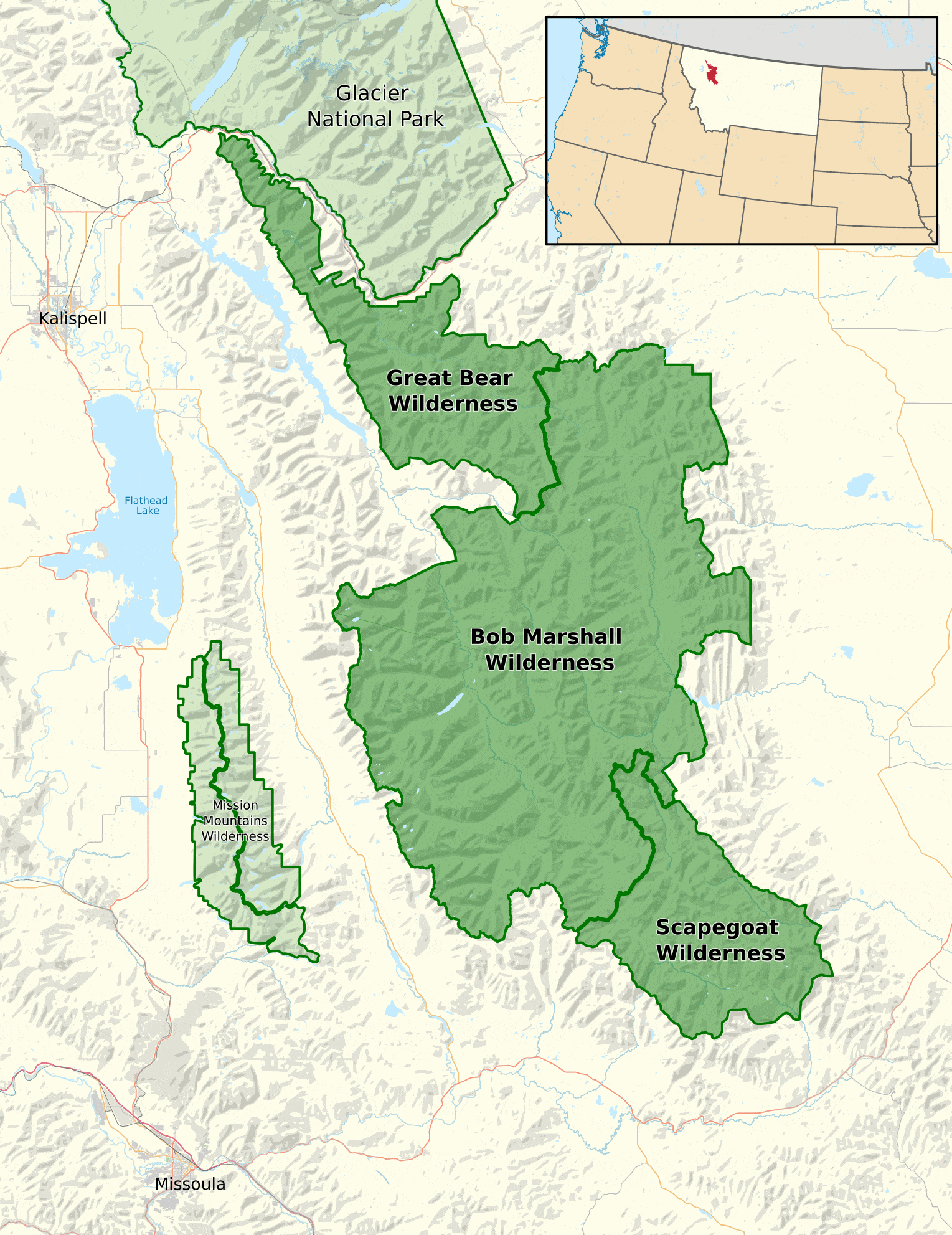
Bob Marshall Wilderness Complex

U.S. Route 2 is to the north and separates the Bob Marshall Wilderness Complex from Glacier National Park. U.S. 89 and 287 are to the east, and Montana highways 200 and 83 are to the south and west. Popular points of entry from the west are located near the communities of Swan Lake, Seeley Lake, Lincoln, and Hungry Horse. From the east, the Bob Marshall Wilderness is accessible from Augusta, Choteau and Dupuyer. The wilderness is approximately 60 miles (97 km) west of Great Falls, Montana; 50 miles (80 km) north of Missoula, and 30 miles (48 km) east of Kalispell; all of the communities have airports with commercial flights.

== History ==
Established on August 16, 1940, by Secretary of Agriculture Henry A. Wallace, the Bob Marshall Wilderness was created by combining the South Fork Primitive Area (584,000 acres), the Pentagon Primitive Area (95,000 acres), and the Sun River Primitive Area (240,000 acres). The wilderness was administratively created in 1940 from the South Fork, Pentagon, and Sun River Primitive Areas (which were designated in the 1930s). Passage of the Wilderness Act in 1964 provided for this wilderness to become part of the National Wilderness Preservation System.

The South Fork Primitive Area was established in 1931 and included the South Fork of the Flathead River as well as tributaries of the Spotted Bear River. Two 160-acre homesteads were established in the area in 1898, they were owned by Thomas Danaher and A. P. McCrea. The Northern Pacific Railway owned 69,000 acres since 1864 under the railway land grant. Under the General Exchange Act of 1922, the Forest Service acquired the private land holdings between 1935 and 1955.

The Pentagon Primitive Area was established in 1933 and included the upper Middle Fork of the Flathead River and part of the Upper Spotted Bear River.

The Sun River Primitive Area was established in 1934. The land was mainly east of the continental divide and was entirely within the boundaries of the Lewis and Clark National Forest.

The wilderness is named in honor of Bob Marshall, a forester with the U.S. Forest Service (USFS). During the 1930s, he ensured the promulgation of regulations to protect such areas by designating as roadless large areas within lands administered by the USFS.

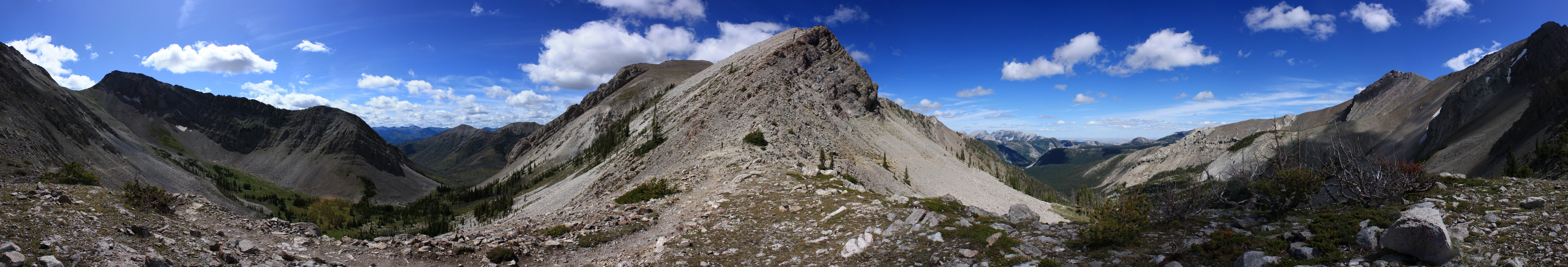
Panorama of Headquarters Pass

== See also ==
- Bob Marshall Wilderness Complex
- Continental Divide Trail
- List of largest wilderness areas in the United States
- Montana Wilderness Association
