= Great Northern Mountain =

Mountain in Montana, United States

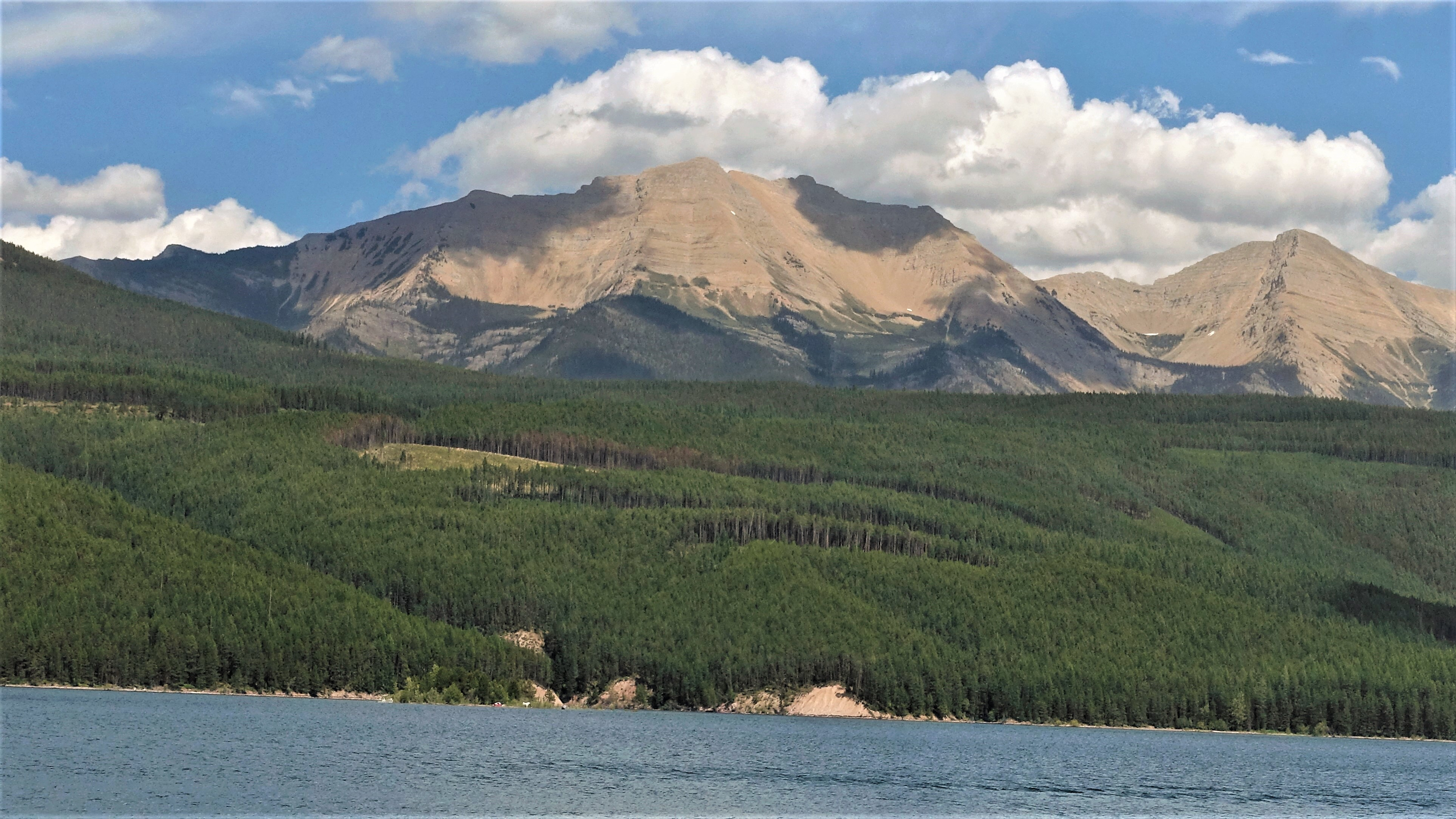
- West aspect, seen from Hungry Horse Reservoir

Highest point
- Elevation: 8,705 ft (2,653 m)
- Prominence: 2,505 ft (764 m)
- Parent peak: Mount Saint Nicholas (9,381 ft)
- Isolation: 11.12 mi (17.90 km)
- Coordinates: 48°20′04″N 113°46′19″W

Naming
- Etymology: Great Northern Railway

Geography
- Location within Montana Location within the United States
- Country: United States
- State: Montana
- County: Flathead
- Protected area: Great Bear Wilderness
- Parent range: Flathead Range; Rocky Mountains
- Topo map: USGS Mount Grant

Great Northern Mountain is a prominent 8,705-foot-elevation (2,653-meter) mountain summit located in Flathead County in the U.S. state of Montana. It is situated in the Flathead National Forest, in the Flathead Range, west of the Continental Divide. Great Northern Mountain is the highest point in the Great Bear Wilderness, and the nearest higher peak is Mount Saint Nicholas, 10.56 miles to the east-northeast in Glacier National Park. Topographic relief is significant as the west aspect rises 5,100 feet (1,600 meters) above Hungry Horse Reservoir in four miles, and the east aspect rises the same in five miles above the Middle Fork Flathead Valley. The Great Northern Railway is the namesake of the mountain, and the mountain is the namesake of the Great Northern Brewing Company.

== Climate ==
According to the Köppen climate classification system, the mountain is located in an alpine subarctic climate zone with long, cold, snowy winters, and cool to warm summers. This climate supports the Stanton Glacier on the north slope. Winter temperatures can drop below −10 °F with wind chill factors below −30 °F. Due to its altitude, it receives precipitation all year, as snow in winter, and as thunderstorms in summer. Precipitation runoff from the mountain drains north into Stanton Creek, which is a tributary of Middle Fork Flathead River, and west slope drains to Hungry Horse Reservoir.

== Gallery ==
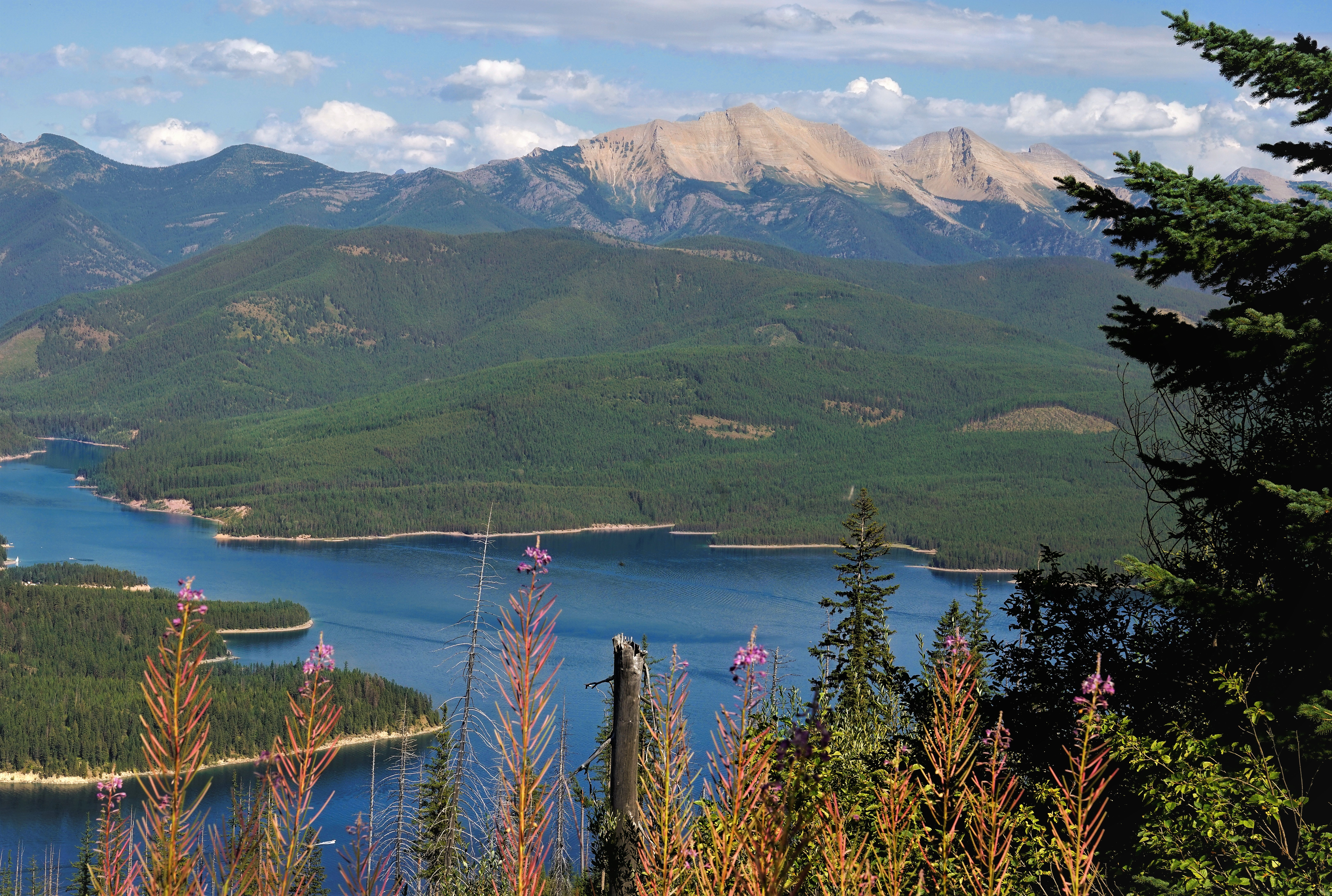
Great Northern Mountain beyond Emery Bay of Hungry Horse Reservoir

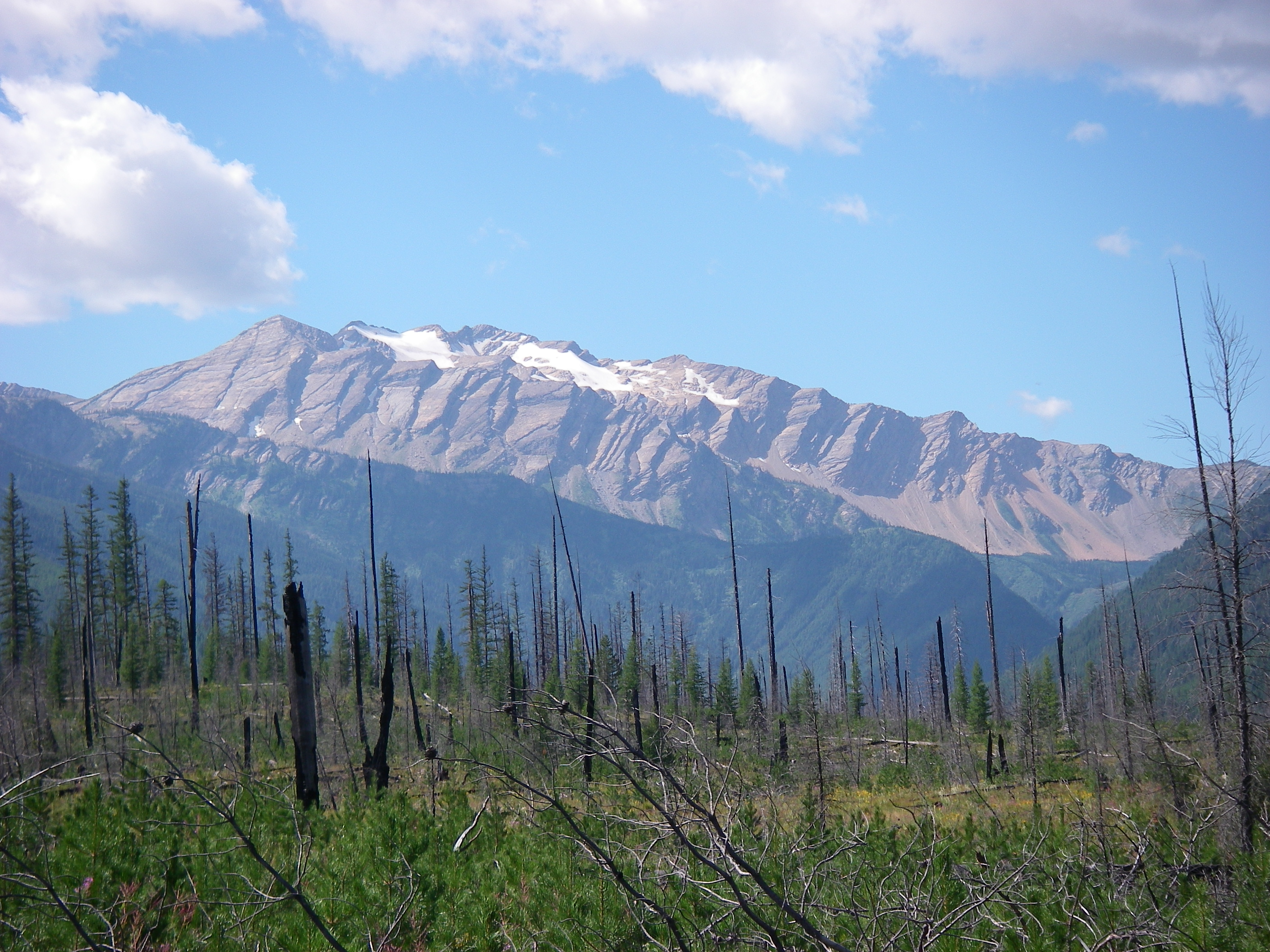
Northeast aspect featuring Stanton Glacier

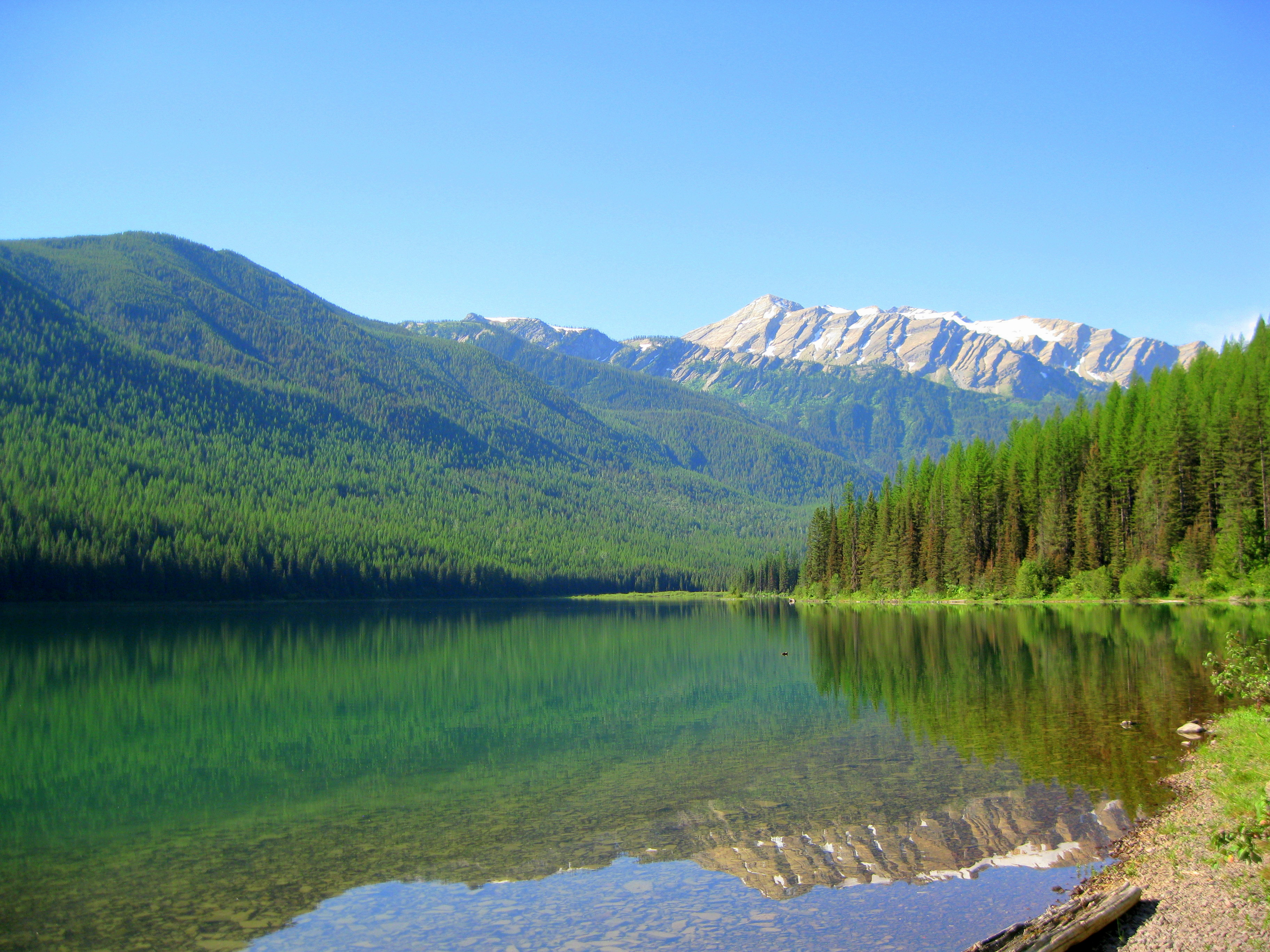
Great Northern Mountain beyond Stanton Lake

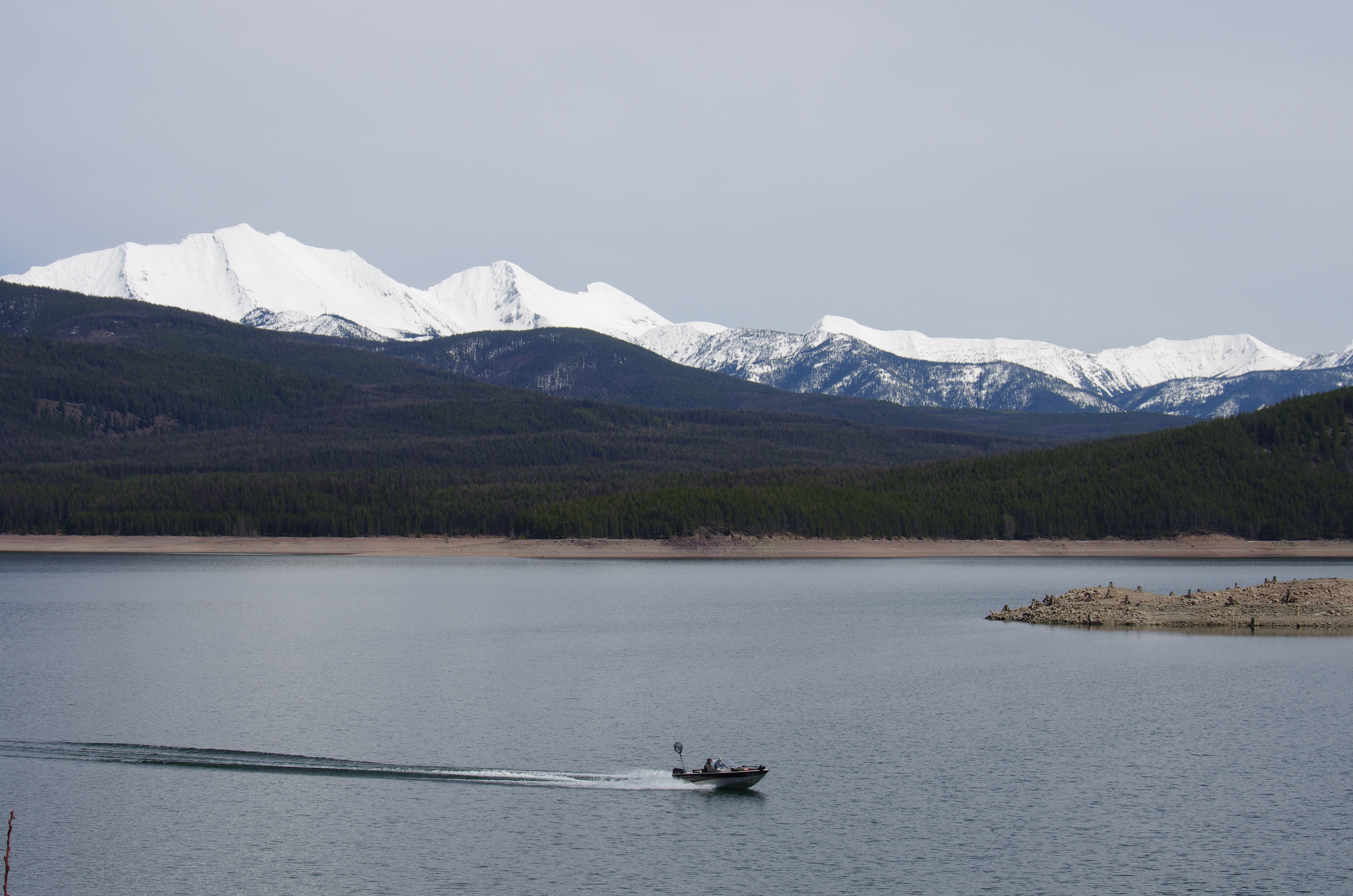
Great Northern Mountain to the left

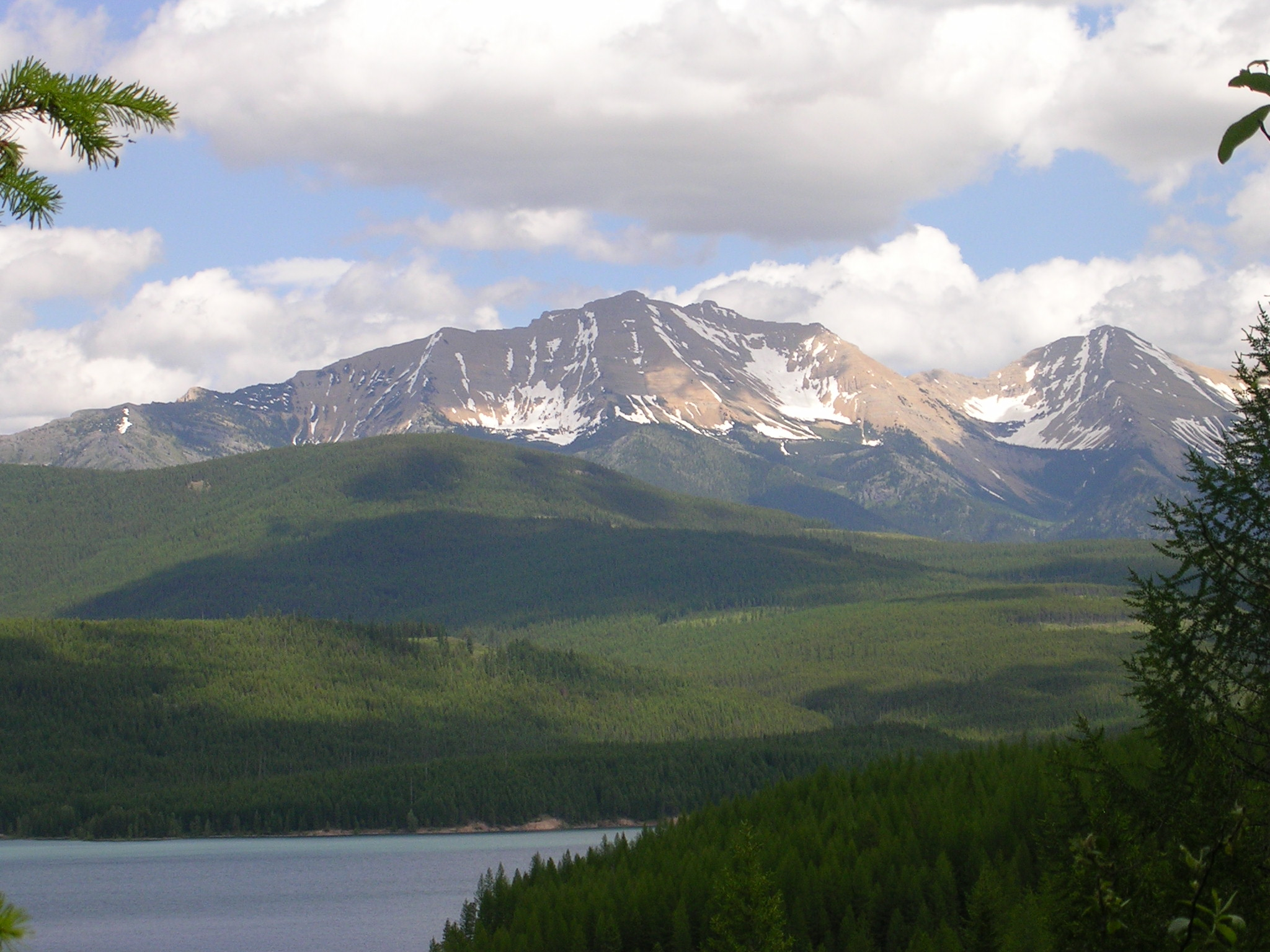
Great Northern Mountain centered with Mount Grant to right

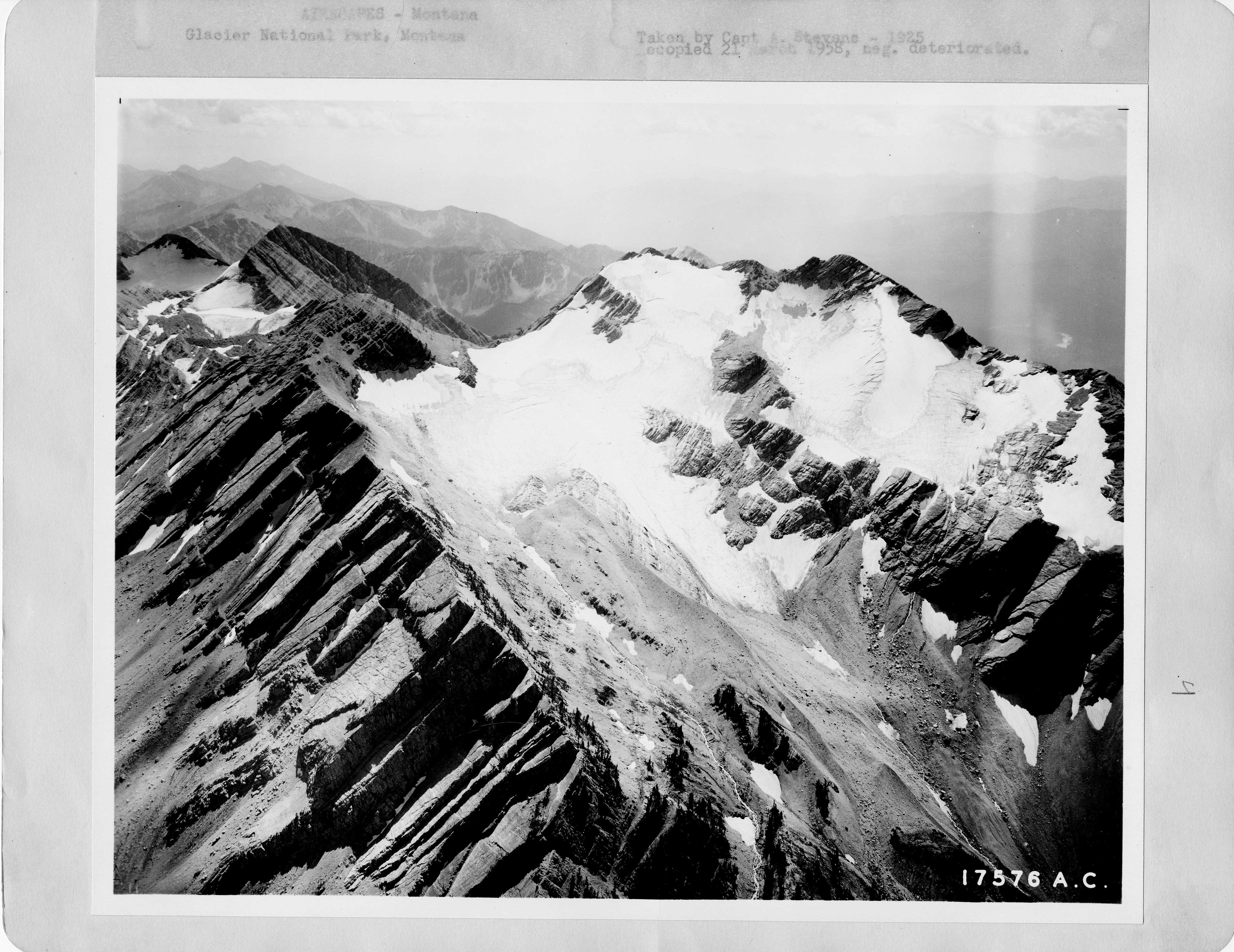
Stanton Glacier on Great Northern Mountain, aerial view, circa 1925

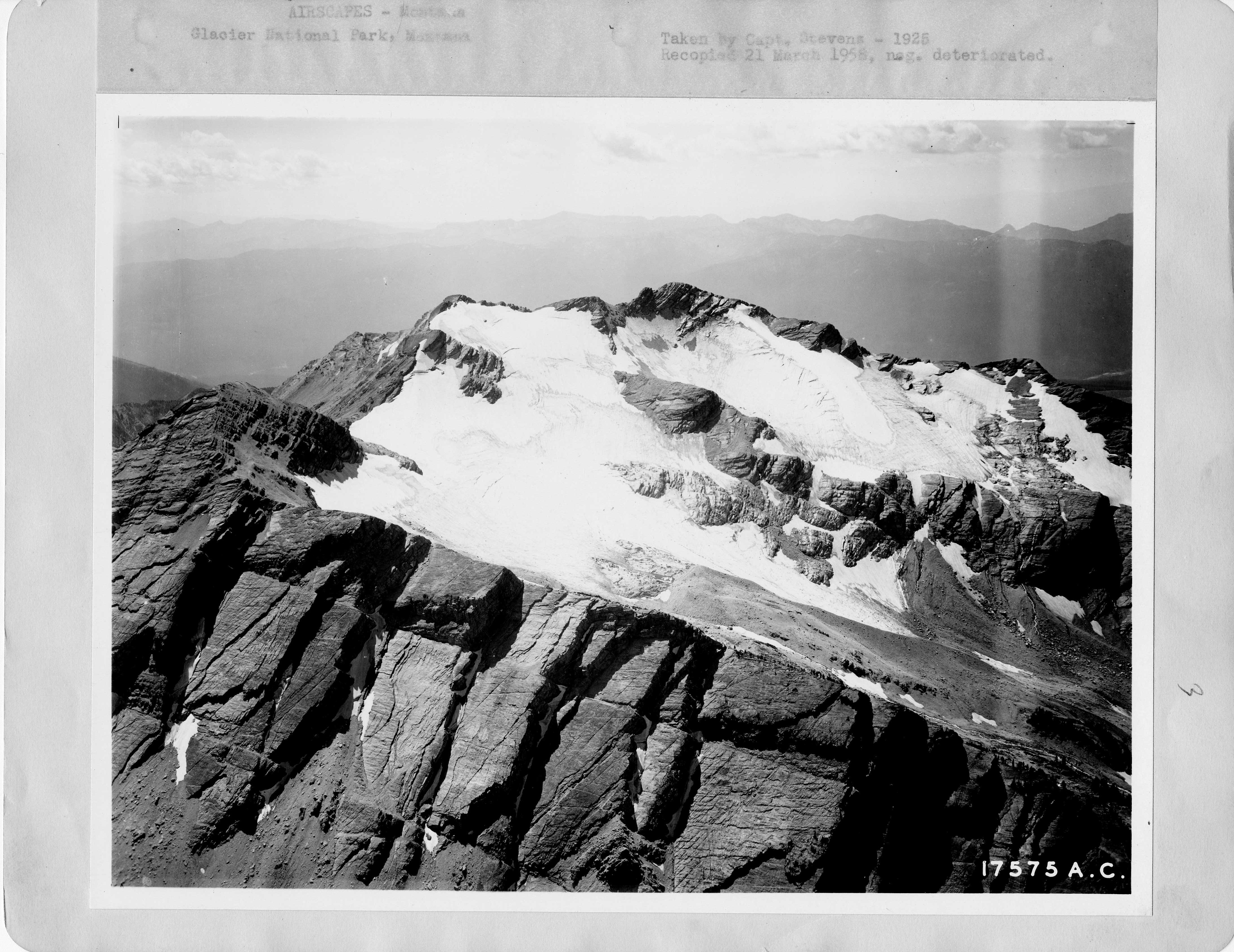
Stanton Glacier on Great Northern Mountain, aerial view, circa 1925

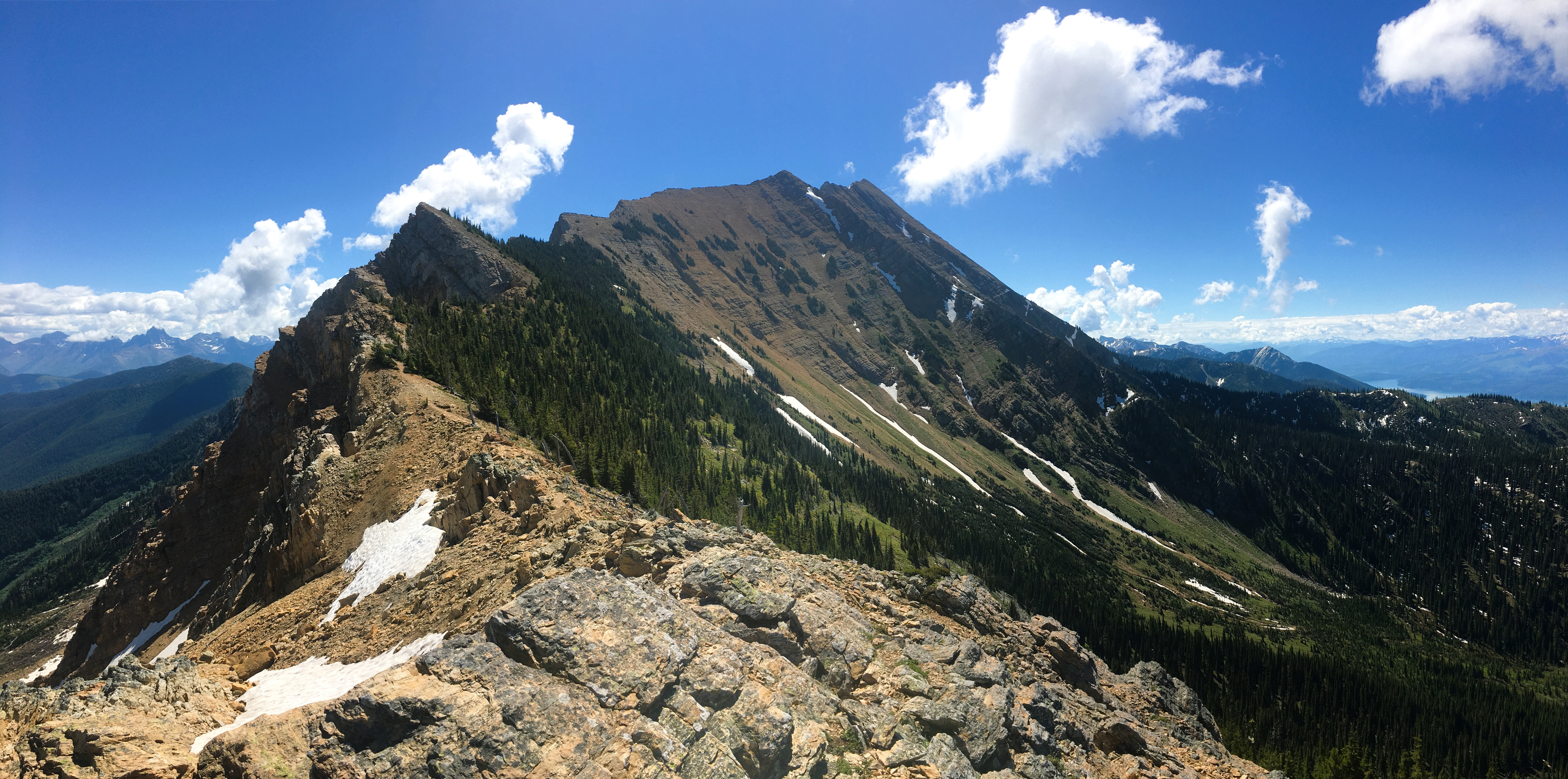
The ridgeline leading up to the summit of Great Northern Mountain

== See also ==
- Geology of the Rocky Mountains
- Mount Grant
