= Dean Creek (Spotted Bear River tributary) =

Stream in Montana, USA

Coordinates: 47°53′51″N 113°14′26″W

Location
- Country: United States
- State: Montana

Physical characteristics
- Mouth: Spotted Bear River

Dean Creek is a stream in the U.S. state of Montana. It is a tributary to the Spotted Bear River.

Dean Creek was named after Richard Dean, a local ranger.
