= Grant Glacier (Montana) =

Glacier in Montana, United States

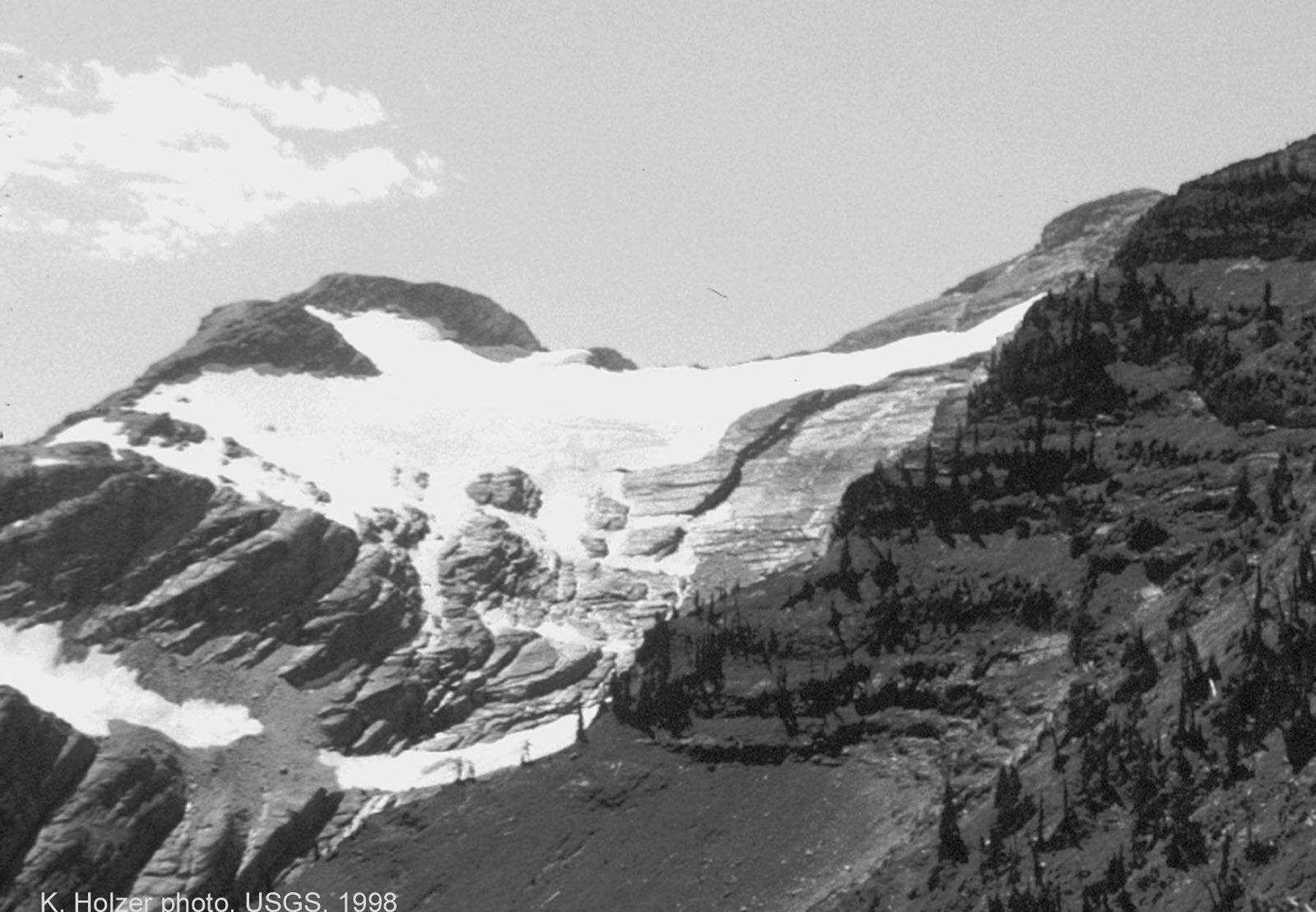
- Grant Glacier as seen in 1998

- Location within Montana
- Type: Cirque glacier
- Location: Flathead County, Montana, U.S.
- Coordinates: 48°19′24″N 113°45′06″W
- Area: 83 acres (34 ha) (in 1995)
- Length: .25 mi (0.40 km)
- Terminus: Barren rock
- Status: Retreating

Grant Glacier is located in the US state of Montana in Flathead National Forest. The glacier is situated in a cirque and lies below the east slopes of Mount Grant (8,590 feet (2,620 m)). Grant Glacier is 1 mile (1.6 km) southeast of Stanton Glacier and both 5 miles (8.0 km) west of Glacier National Park (U.S.). Images taken of the glacier in 1902 and from the same vantage point in 1998 indicate that the glacier retreated substantially during the 20th Century.

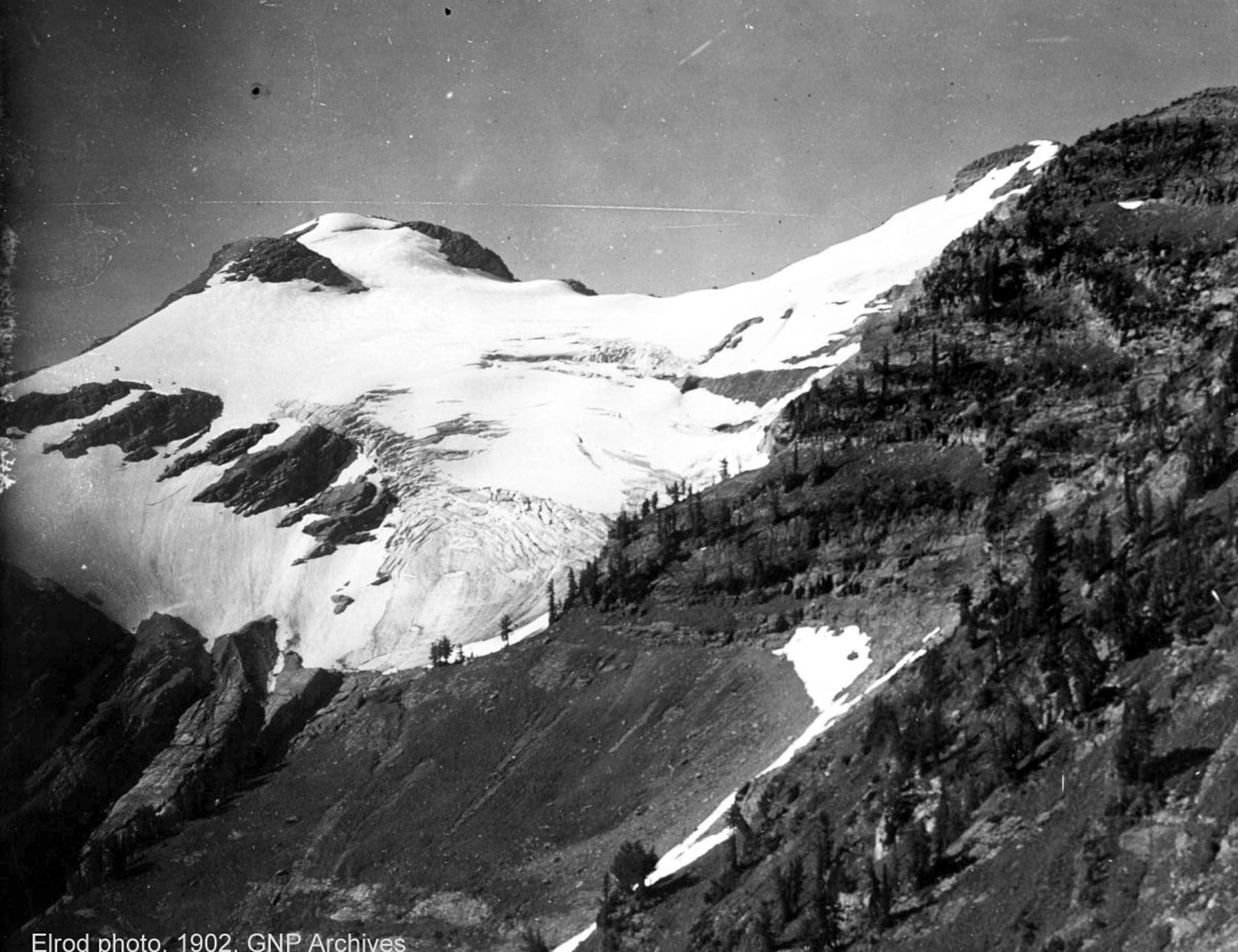
Comparing the image at right taken in 1998, with this image taken in 1902, substantial retreat of Grant Glacier over the course of the 20th Century is apparent

== See also ==
- List of glaciers in the United States
