= Scapegoat Wilderness =

Protected natural area in Montana, United States

- IUCN category Ib (wilderness area)
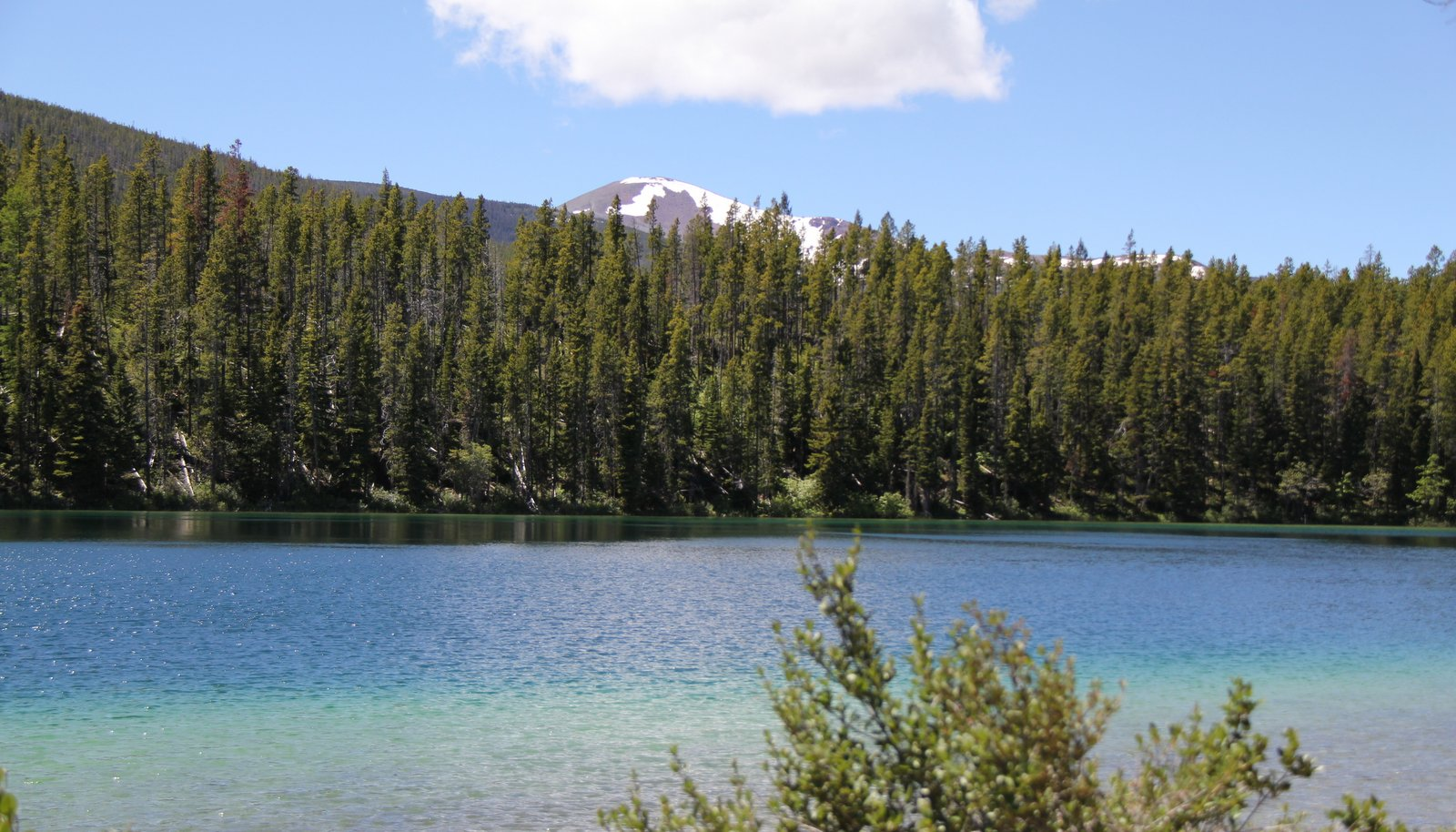

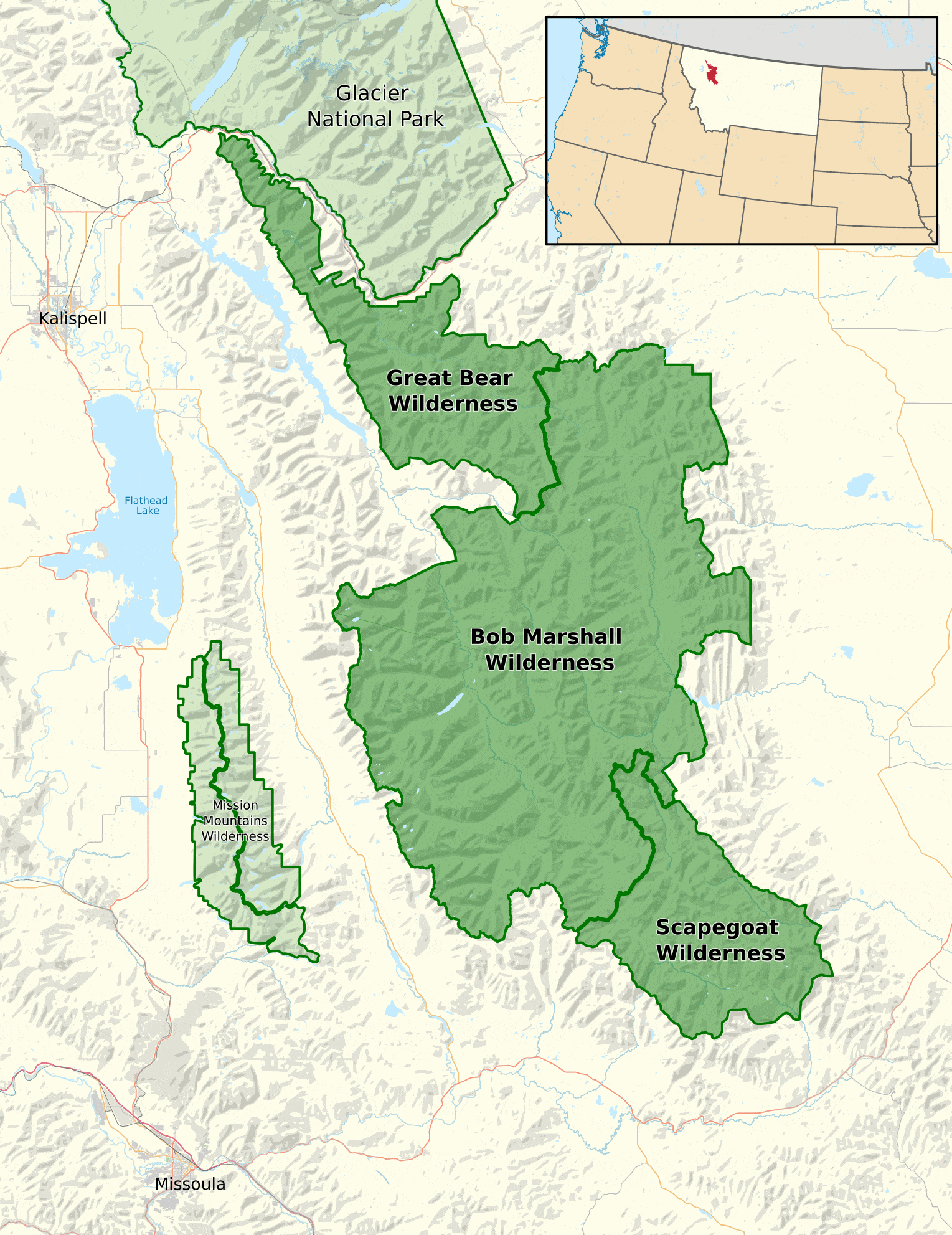
- Bob Marshall Wilderness Complex
- Location: Lewis and Clark / Powell counties, Montana, United States
- Nearest city: Missoula, MT
- Coordinates: 47°07′N 112°44′W
- Area: 239,936 acres (970.99 km^{2})
- Established: 1972
- Governing body: U.S. Forest Service

The Scapegoat Wilderness consists of 239,936 acres (971 km^{2}) spread across two different National Forests in the U.S. state of Montana. Created by an act of Congress in 1972, the wilderness is located in the Helena-Lewis and Clark and Lolo National Forests. The Scapegoat Wilderness is a part of the 1.5 million acre (6,070 km^{2}) Bob Marshall Wilderness Complex as it shares a boundary with the Bob Marshall Wilderness, which in turn is connected to the Great Bear Wilderness further north.

U.S. Wilderness Areas do not allow motorized or mechanized vehicles, including bicycles. Although camping and fishing are allowed with proper permit, no roads or buildings are constructed and there is also no logging or mining, in compliance with the 1964 Wilderness Act. Wilderness areas within National Forests and Bureau of Land Management areas also allow hunting in season.

The Continental Divide creates the western boundary of the wilderness. Rising as much as 1,500 feet (460 m) in places, the Chinese Wall, a portion of the expansive Rocky Mountain Front, stretches a distance of 20 miles (32 km) through the wilderness. With elevations between 5,000 to 9,000 feet (1,500 to 2,700 m) or more above sea level, the wilderness lies just west of the Great Plains, and from the higher mountaintops the views to the east extend for 70 miles (110 km) . The highest peak in the wilderness is Red Mountain 9,414 feet (2,869 m). The Continental Divide Trail travels through the wilderness roughly north to south.

With most of the wilderness heavily forested in conifers, the primary tree species found include Engelmann spruce, ponderosa pine, lodgepole pine and Douglas fir. The wolf and grizzly call the wilderness home as do black bears, moose, elk, mountain goats, bighorn sheep and mule deer. Rare sightings of wolverine and mountain lions are possible along with bald eagles, peregrine falcons, trumpeter swans and pelicans. Eight species of fish inhabit the lakes and streams with rainbow trout and northern pike being the most common game fish. Fourteen lakes are located in the wilderness as well as the headwaters of the Blackfoot River.

Considered an excellent backpacking region, there are over 150 miles (240 km) of trails which generally follow the numerous streams and rivers. Pack trips on horseback are also a popular mode of travel.

Located about 75 miles (120 km) northeast of Missoula, Montana, the best access is from forest service roads off U.S. Highway 287 and Montana highways 200 and 83.

Bugle Mountain (also known as "Bugle Peak"), located in the Scapegoat Wilderness, was the setting of a forest fire in the fictional 1952 motion picture Red Skies of Montana. The film, based in part on the tragic 1949 Mann Gulch fire, was filmed in Montana.

== Climate ==
Red Mountain (Lewis and Clark County, Montana) is a peak on the far southern edge of the Scapegoat Wilderness.

Climate data for Red Mountain (MT) 47.1074 N, 112.7421 W, Elevation: 8,914 ft (2,717 m) (1991–2020 normals)
Month	Jan	Feb	Mar	Apr	May	Jun	Jul	Aug	Sep	Oct	Nov	Dec	Year
Mean daily maximum °F (°C)	22.6 (−5.2)	23.5 (−4.7)	29.4 (−1.4)	34.9 (1.6)	43.9 (6.6)	51.7 (10.9)	62.8 (17.1)	62.7 (17.1)	53.2 (11.8)	39.3 (4.1)	27.0 (−2.8)	21.3 (−5.9)	39.4 (4.1)
Daily mean °F (°C)	16.3 (−8.7)	15.7 (−9.1)	20.3 (−6.5)	25.4 (−3.7)	34.0 (1.1)	41.4 (5.2)	51.2 (10.7)	51.0 (10.6)	42.6 (5.9)	30.9 (−0.6)	20.7 (−6.3)	15.2 (−9.3)	30.4 (−0.9)
Mean daily minimum °F (°C)	9.9 (−12.3)	7.9 (−13.4)	11.3 (−11.5)	15.9 (−8.9)	24.0 (−4.4)	31.1 (−0.5)	39.7 (4.3)	39.4 (4.1)	32.0 (0.0)	22.4 (−5.3)	14.4 (−9.8)	9.0 (−12.8)	21.4 (−5.9)
Average precipitation inches (mm)	6.30 (160)	4.92 (125)	5.16 (131)	4.51 (115)	4.21 (107)	4.60 (117)	1.70 (43)	1.82 (46)	2.76 (70)	4.47 (114)	6.06 (154)	6.74 (171)	53.25 (1,353)
Source: PRISM Climate Group

== See also ==
- Montana Wilderness Association
