= Flathead Range (Montana) =

Mountain range in Montana, United States

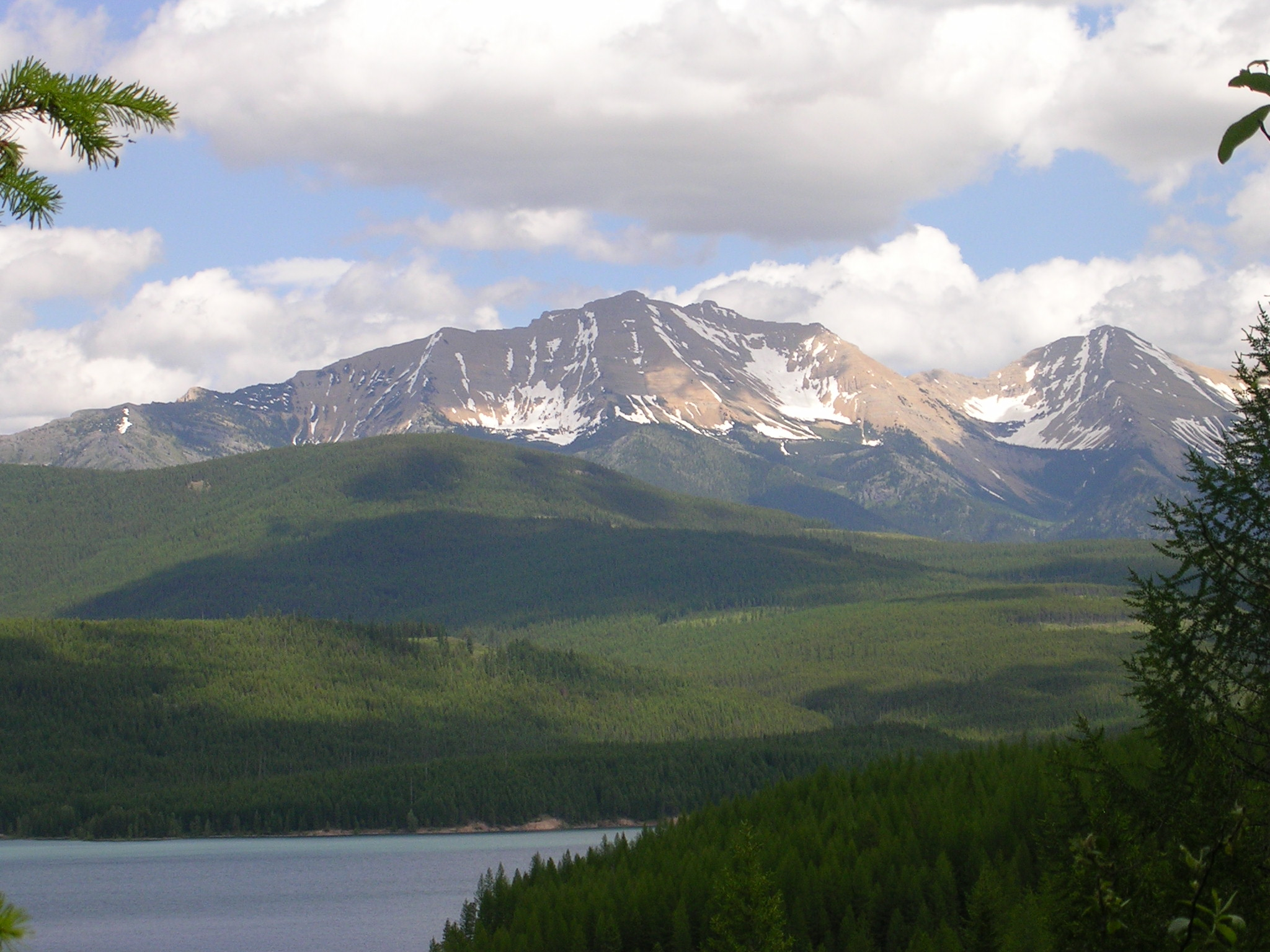
- Great Northern Mountain from Hungry Horse Reservoir

Highest point
- Peak: Red Mountain
- Elevation: 9,411 ft (2,868 m)
- Coordinates: 47°42′00″N 113°18′00″W

Dimensions
- Length: 111 mi (179 km) N–S
- Width: 70 mi (110 km) E–W

Geography
- Location within Montana Location within the United States
- Country: United States
- State: Montana
- Parent range: Rocky Mountains

The Flathead Range is a mountain range of the Northern Rocky Mountains located southeast of Whitefish, Montana in the Great Bear Wilderness, part of the Bob Marshall Wilderness Complex. It is west of the Rocky Mountain Front, east of the Swan Range and southeast of the Whitefish Range. Its west side is drained by the South Fork Flathead River which forms Hungry Horse Reservoir.

The highest peak is Red Mountain at 9,411 ft. Scapegoat Mountain is the second-highest and Pentagon Mountain is ninth-highest.

== Climate ==
Based on the Köppen climate classification, Flathead Range is located in a subarctic climate zone with long, cold, snowy winters, and cool to warm summers. Temperatures can drop below −10 °F with wind chill factors below −30 °F.

== See also ==
- List of mountain ranges in Montana
