= Bob Marshall Wilderness Complex =

Wilderness areas in Montana, United States

Coordinates: 47°40′51″N 113°10′29″W

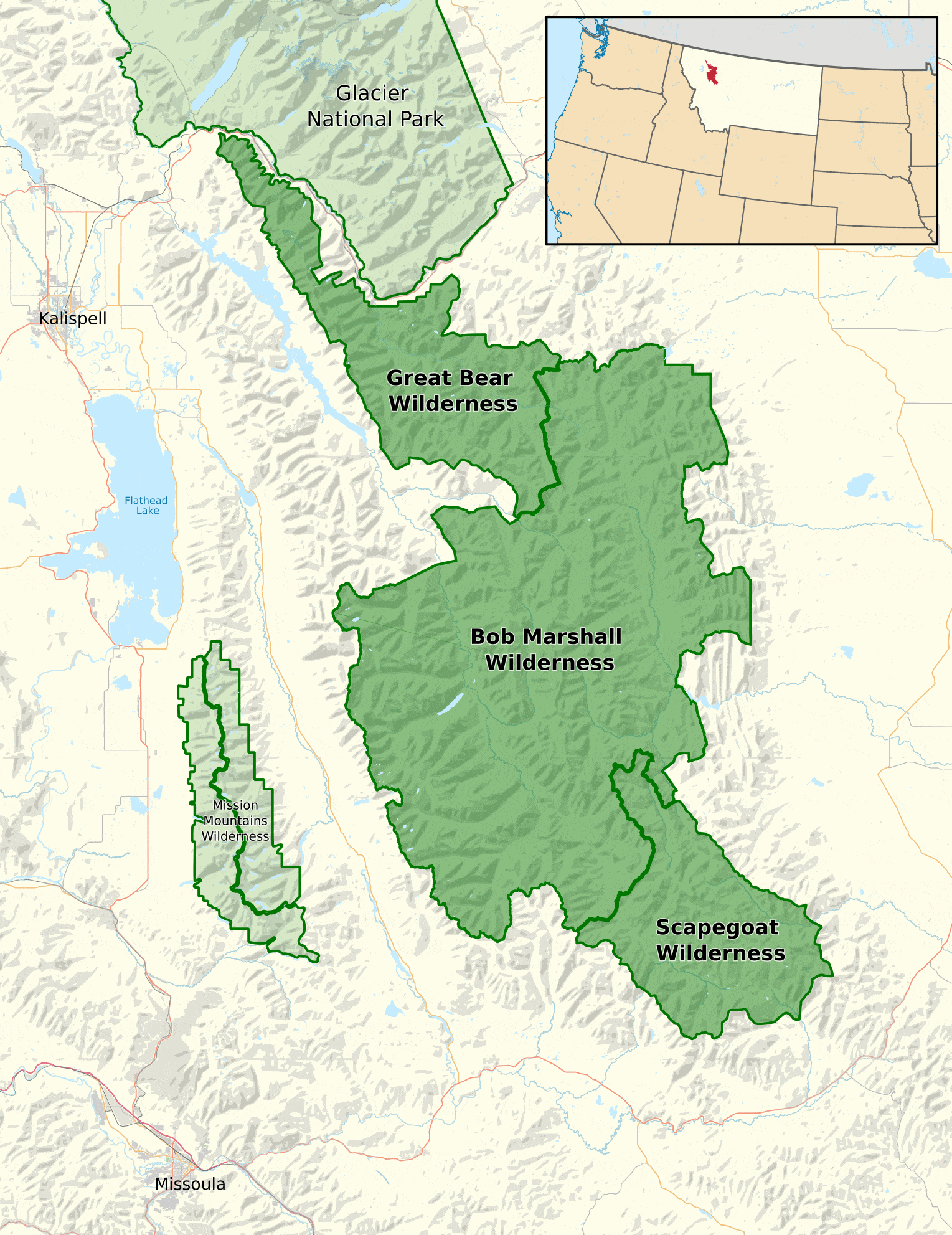
Bob Marshall Wilderness Complex Map

The Bob Marshall Wilderness Complex consists of three wilderness areas, all within the U.S. state of Montana, totalling over 1.5 million acres (6,100 km). The largest wilderness area is the Bob Marshall Wilderness Area consisting of one million acres (4000 km). Adjoining the Bob Marshall to the north is the Great Bear Wilderness of 286,700 acres (1,160 km), and to the south of the Bob Marshall is the Scapegoat Wilderness consisting of 239,936 acres (971 km). An additional one million acres of roadless National Forest, private, and BLM land surrounds the designated wildernesses on all sides, for a total roadless area of 2.54 million acres.

Located in the northern Rocky Mountains along the Continental Divide, the region is as primitive as any found in the United States outside of Alaska. Indeed, the Bob Marshall region is the most ecologically complete mountain wilderness in the country, according to Wolke. Although renowned for excellent fishing and backpacking opportunities, most of those that enter the wilderness complex do so on horseback and there are outfitters that provide guided pack trips into the region. The Bob Marshall Wilderness Complex is also well known for being prime grizzly bear habitat, with a population density of species considered to be one of the highest in the lower 48 states outside of the Greater Yellowstone Ecosystem according to the National Park Service. Grizzlies migrating from the Complex range well out onto the Great Plains to the east, the only place this still occurs. Every species of mammal indigenous to the Northern Rockies still lives in this area and adjacent Glacier National Park, except bison and woodland caribou. Huge herds of elk, bighorn sheep, and mountain goat roam the region's rugged peaks, big river valleys, large meadows, and vast coniferous forests.

The region is diverse, as it encompasses the dry and open Rocky Mountain Front Range on the east, and the lush and heavily timbered Swan Range and Flathead Range on the west. Outside of the designated wildernesses, in the northeast portion of the roadless area, the 115,000-acre Badger-Two Medicine area is sacred to the Blackfeet Indians.
