= Deans Creek (Marshall Creek tributary) =

Location
- Country: United States
- State: California

Physical characteristics
- Source
  - coordinates: 37°04′56″N 122°06′30″W
- Mouth: Carolina Creek
  - coordinates: 37°05′32″N 122°06′06″W
  - elevation: 220 ft (67 m)

Deans Creek is a river in the U.S. State of California.
