= Stanton Glacier =

Glacier in the U.S. state of Montana

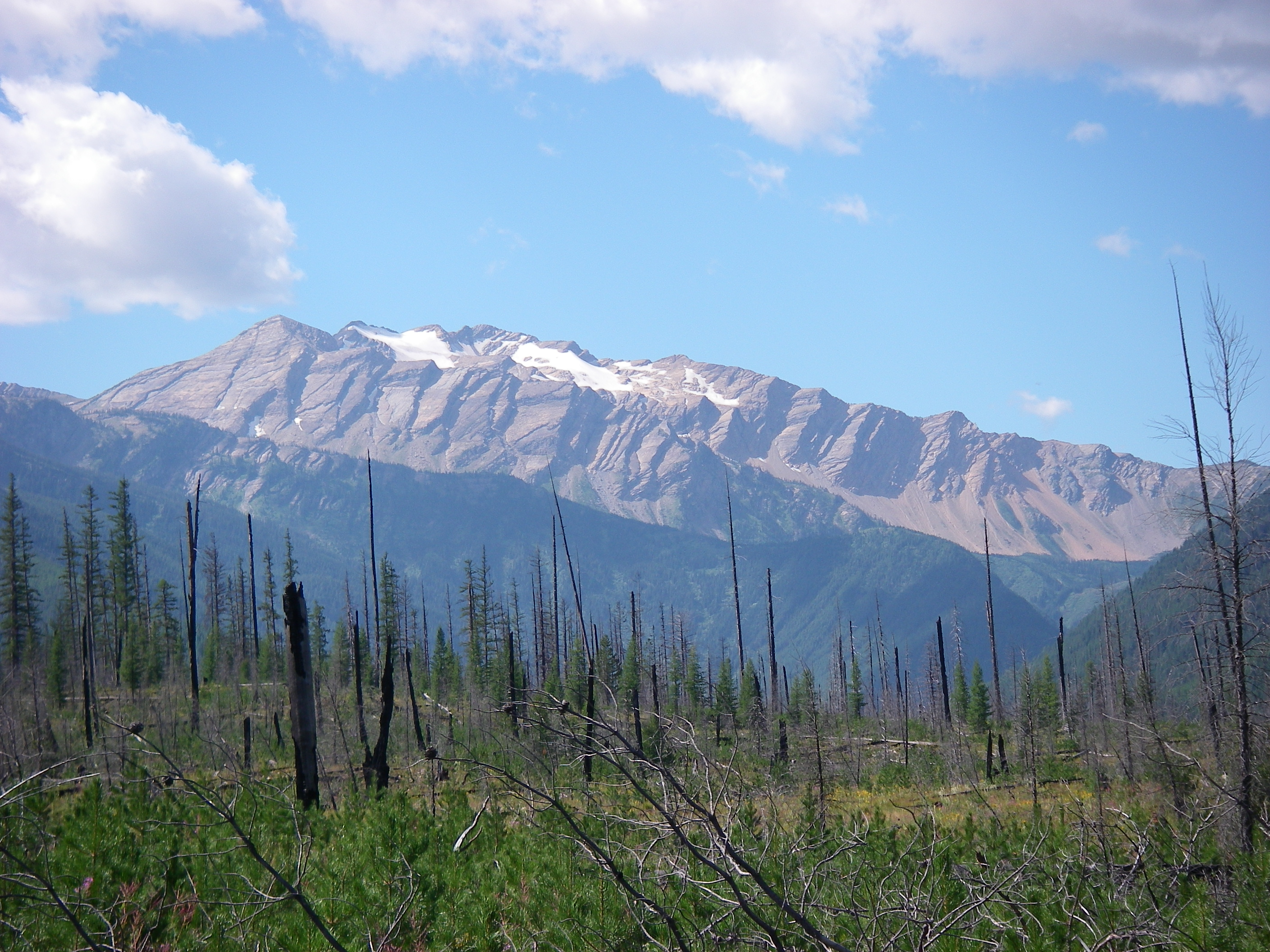
- Great Northern Mountain and Stanton Glacier (2009)

- Location within Montana
- Type: Cirque glacier
- Location: Flathead County, Montana, U.S.
- Coordinates: 48°20′13″N 113°46′29″W
- Length: .20 miles (0.32 km)
- Status: Retreating

Stanton Glacier is a glacier in Flathead National Forest in the U.S. state of Montana. The glacier is situated in a cirque on the northeast slope of Great Northern Mountain (8,705 ft (2,653 m)). Stanton Glacier is one of several glaciers that have been selected for monitoring by the U.S. Geological Survey's Glacier Monitoring Research program, which is researching changes to the mass balance of glaciers in and surrounding Glacier National Park (U.S.). Stanton Glacier is 1 mile (1.6 km) northwest of Grant Glacier.

== See also ==
- List of glaciers in the United States

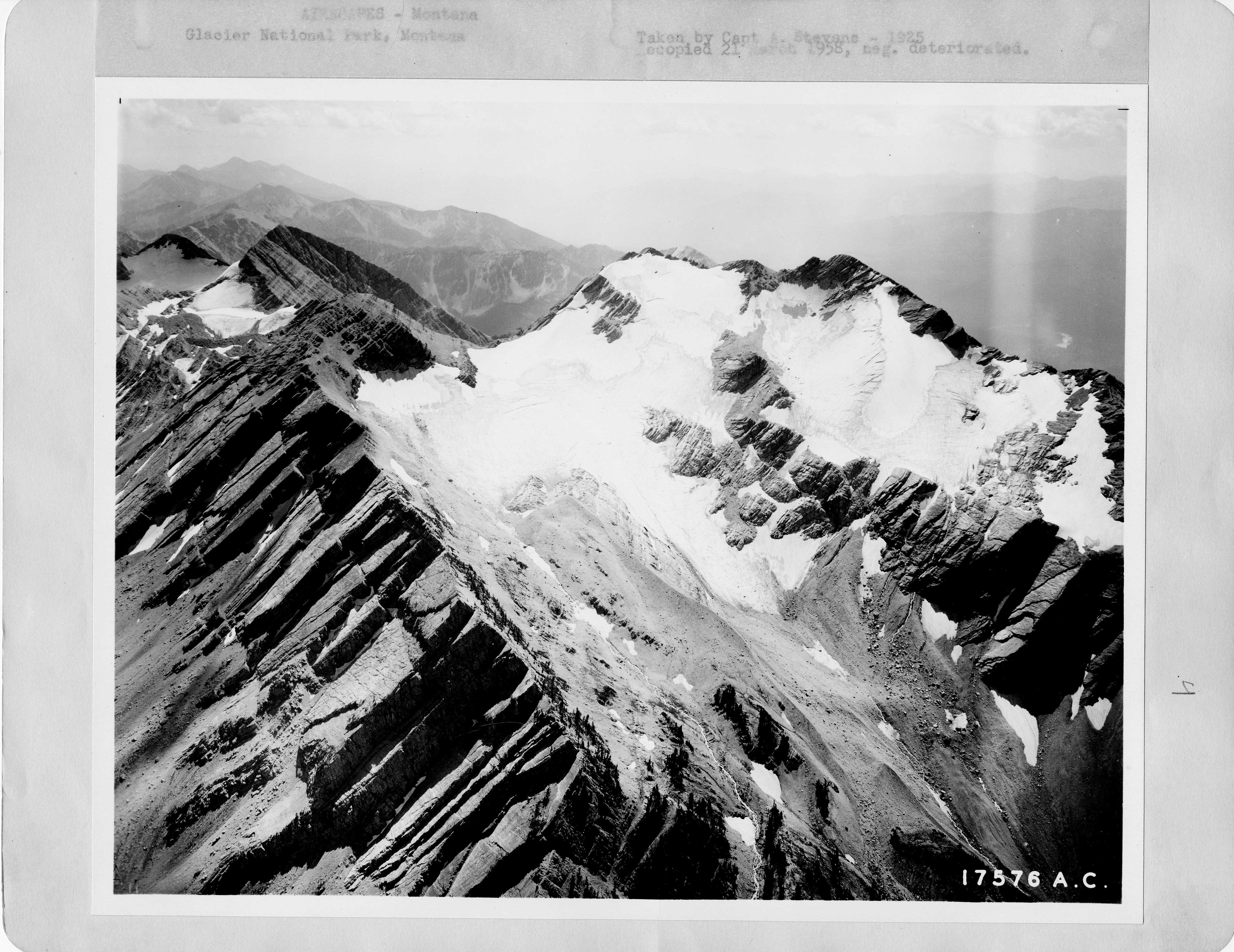
Aerial view, circa 1925
