= Deans Creek (Carolina Creek tributary) =

Location
- Country: United States
- State: Texas

Physical characteristics
- Source
  - coordinates: 30°44′34″N 95°19′00″W
- Mouth: Carolina Creek
  - coordinates: 30°46′36″N 95°19′18″W
  - elevation: 220 ft (67 m)

Deans Creek is a river in the U.S. State of Texas.
