= Great Bear Wilderness =

Wilderness area in Montana, United States

- IUCN category Ib (wilderness area)
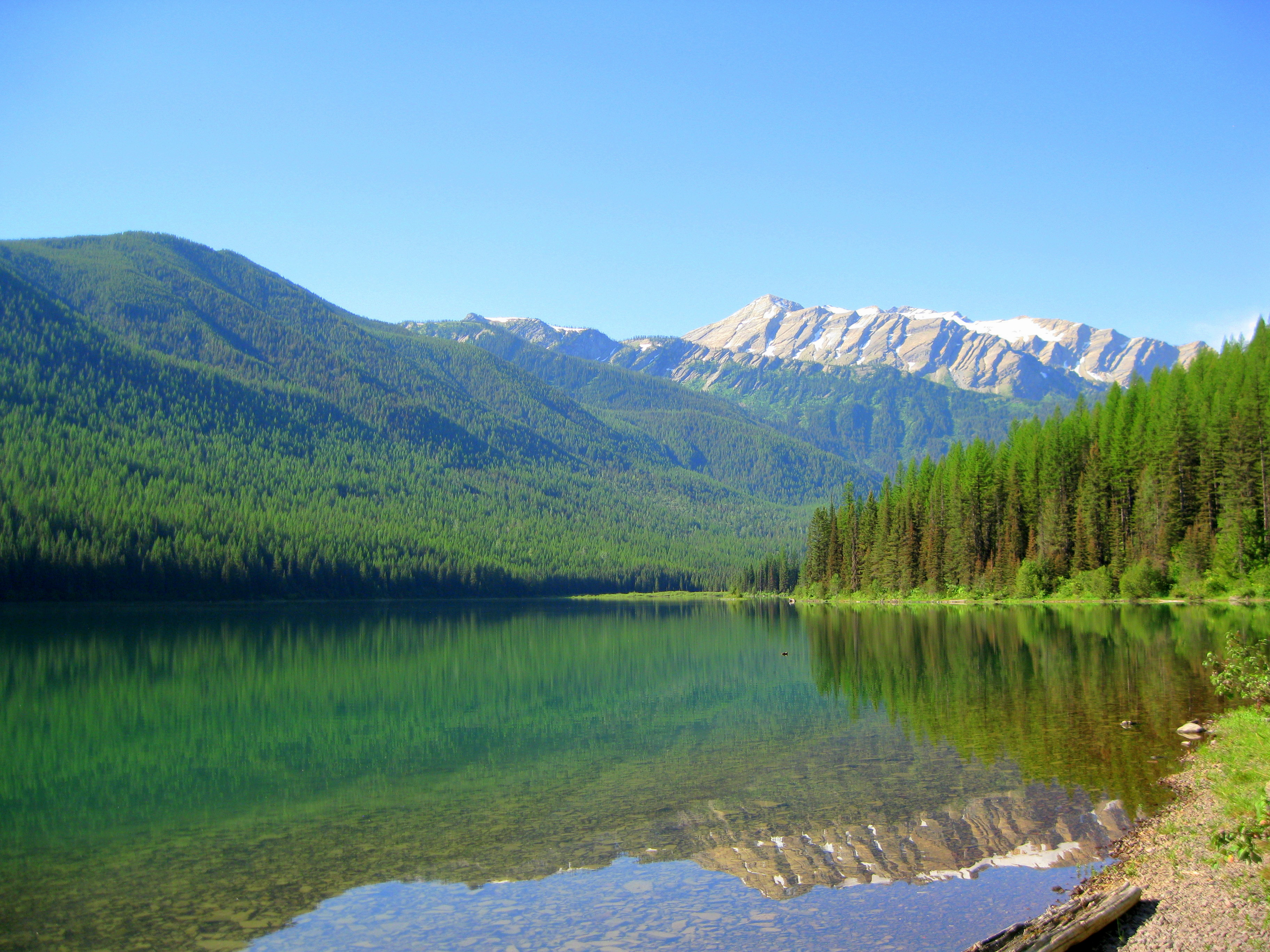
- Great Northern Mountain behind Stanton Lake

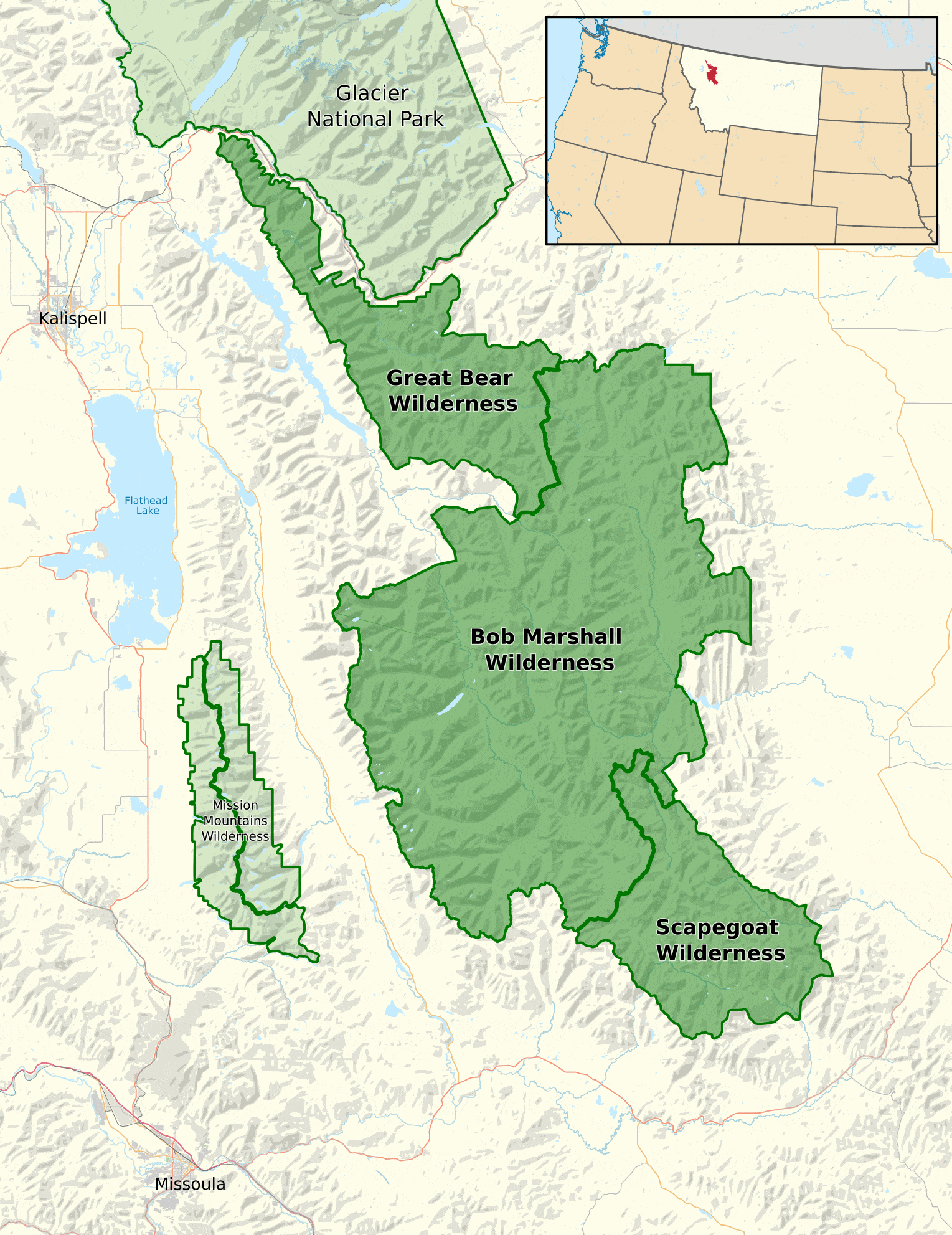
- Bob Marshall Wilderness Complex
- Location: Flathead County, Montana, United States
- Coordinates: 48°11′10″N 113°35′03″W
- Area: 286,700 acres (1,160 km^{2})
- Established: 1978
- Governing body: U.S. Forest Service
- Website: Montana Office of Tourism

The Great Bear Wilderness is located in northern Montana, United States, within Flathead National Forest Created by an act of Congress in 1978, the wilderness comprises 286,700 acres (1,160 km^{2}) and borders the Bob Marshall Wilderness on the north. The Great Bear and Bob Marshall Wildernesses, along with the Scapegoat Wilderness which borders the Bob Marshall to the south, collectively form the Bob Marshall Wilderness Complex, which is over 1.5 million acres (6,100 km^{2}) of almost untouched landscape. Glacier National Park is separated from the Great Bear Wilderness by U.S. Highway 2.

U.S. Wilderness Areas do not allow motorized or mechanized vehicles, including bicycles. Although camping and fishing are allowed with proper permit, no roads or buildings are constructed and there is also no logging or mining, in compliance with the 1964 Wilderness Act. Wilderness areas within National Forests and Bureau of Land Management areas also allow hunting in season.

The Great Bear is located west of the Continental Divide which forms the eastern boundary. Great Northern Mountain (8,705 ft; 2,653 m) is the highest peak in the wilderness which is dominated by dozens of other mountains, all part of the Rocky Mountain Front, a huge overthrust fault that spans for 400 miles (640 km) through Canada and Montana. Great Bear is the origination point of the wild and scenic designated Middle Fork of the Flathead River, which flows for 50 miles (80 km) through the wilderness and is rarely visited.

In the valleys a dense coniferous forest is dominated by various species of spruce, pine and fir. Living up to its name, the wilderness is prime grizzly bear habitat and has some of the most dense populations of the species anywhere in the lower 48 states. Black bears are more common however and there is a sizable number of black bears that are cinnamon colored here, which are often mistaken for grizzlies. Other mammals found in the wilderness include lynx, wolverine, mule deer, elk, moose, mountain goat, and bighorn sheep. There are few lakes in the wilderness, but over 500 miles (800 km) of named streams and rivers.

300 miles (480 km) of hiking trails exist in the wilderness, but many of them are poorly maintained. Much of the interior sections have no trails, requiring travelers to bushwack. Even on maintained trails frequent stream crossings are common and can be especially dangerous, particularly in the spring during snowmelt. For the most part, winter snows have completely melted by mid May, although higher terrain may continue to have small snowfields year round. Summertime brings pesky mosquitos and thunderstorms which often produce more lightning than rain. The winters are often bitter with deep snowfalls and frigid temperatures.

== See also ==
- Glacier National Park
- Flathead National Forest
- Stanton Glacier
