= Middle Fork Flathead River =

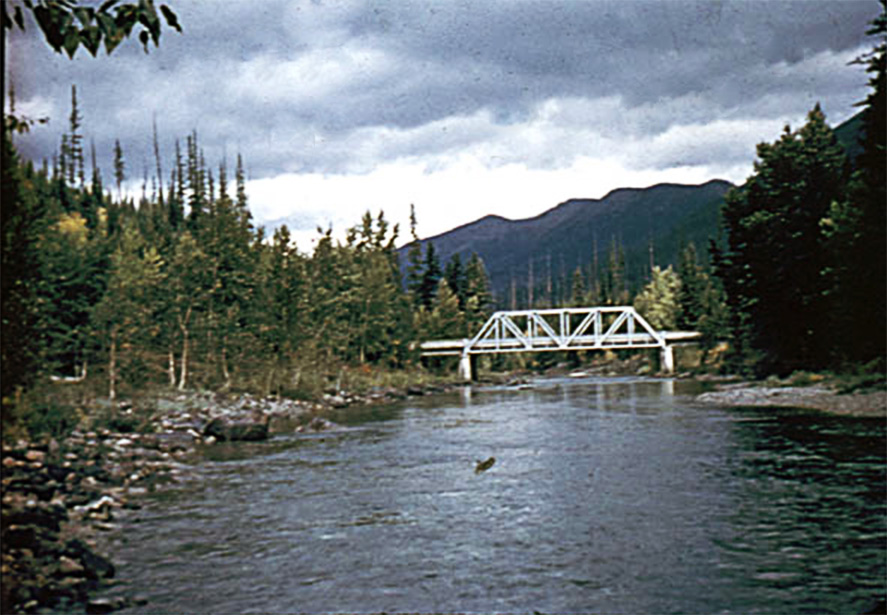
- The river near Essex, Montana

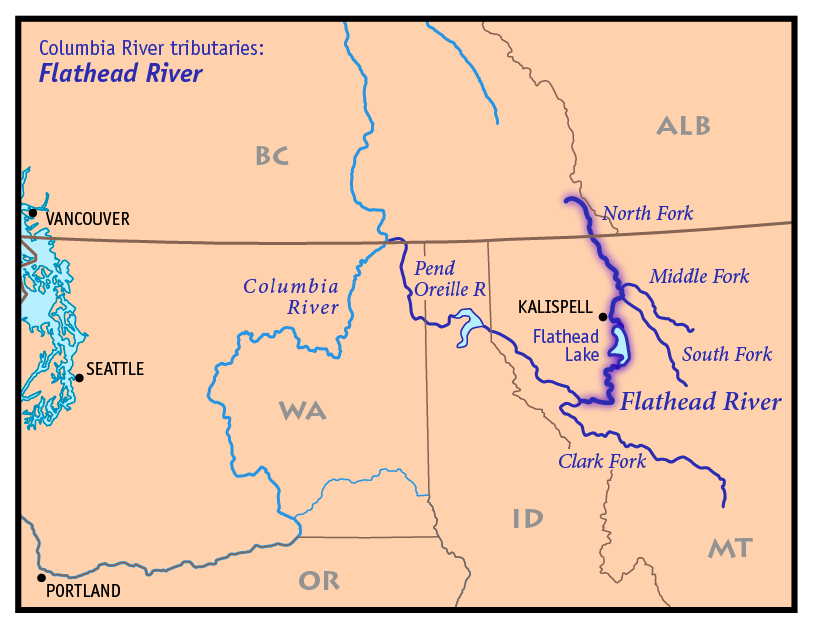
- Map of the Flathead River watershed showing the Middle Fork

Location
- Country: United States
- State: Montana
- Cities: West Glacier, Montana, Essex, Montana

Physical characteristics
- Source: Bob Marshall Wilderness
  - location: Montana, United States
  - coordinates: 47°59′47″N 113°03′30″W
- Mouth: Flathead River
  - location: Montana, United States
  - coordinates: 48°28′01″N 114°04′09″W
  - elevation: 3,120 ft (950 m)
- Length: 92 mi (148 km)
- Basin size: 1,160 sq mi (3,000 km^{2})
- Discharge
  - location: West Glacier, 3.8 miles (6.1 km) above the mouth
  - average: 2,854 cu ft/s (80.8 m^{3}/s)
  - minimum: 189 cu ft/s (5.4 m^{3}/s)
  - maximum: 140,000 cu ft/s (4,000 m^{3}/s)

National Wild and Scenic River
- Designated: October 12, 1976

The Middle Fork Flathead River is a 92-mile (148 km) river in western Montana in the United States, forming the southwestern boundary of Glacier National Park. Its drainage basin lies to the east of the South Fork Flathead River and the Hungry Horse Reservoir. Towns along the river include West Glacier, Nyack, Pinnacle, Essex, and Nimrod.

The river's headwaters lie in the Bob Marshall Wilderness at the confluence of two small streams, Strawberry Creek and Bowl Creek. From there, it runs north, receiving many tributaries from glacial valleys to the east and west, most of them inside Glacier National Park. The river begins to parallel U.S. Highway 2 as it winds north-northwest, and after a long and narrow course, the river enters a wider valley and begins to spread out and braid between meadows and forested slopes. It then enters another narrow gorge, turning generally westwards, then passing the southwestern entrance of the national park, receives a tributary from Lake McDonald, a large glacial lake to the north, from the right. The river then proceeds southwest to meet the North Fork Flathead River, southwest of West Glacier and northeast of Columbia Falls, forming the main stem of the Flathead River, which eventually flows into the Clark Fork River (the Pend Oreille River).

== Tributaries ==
The following minor creeks are tributaries to the Middle Fork Flathead River:

East side
- Strawberry Creek
  - Grimsley Creek
- Bowl Creek
  - Scalp Creek
  - Park Creek
- Winter Creek
- Cox Creek
- Calbick Creek
- Surprise Creek
- Morrison Creek
- Edna Creek
- Bear Creek
  - Giefer Creek
- Spruce Creek
- Bradley Creek
West side
- Clack Creek
- Schafer Creek
- Porter Creek
- Long Creek
  - Bergsicker Creek
- Charlie Creek
- Dirtyface Creek
- Paola Creek

== See also ==
- List of rivers of Montana
