= Spotted Bear River =

Stream in Montana, U.S.

Coordinates: 47°55′29″N 113°31′37″W

Spotted Bear River is a stream in the U.S. state of Montana. It is a tributary to the South Fork Flathead River.

Spotted Bear River was named in 1861 by a party of miners who encountered a bear with white spots.
