= Timeline of Montana history =

Coordinates: 47.0527°N 109.6333°W

This timeline is a chronology of significant events in the history of the U.S. State of Montana and the historical area now occupied by the state.

2000s 1900s 1800s Statehood Territory 1700s 1600s 1500s Before 1492

== 2020s ==
Year	Date	Event
2024	November 5	The 2024 General Election will be held on November 5, 2024.
2022	November 8	In the 2022 general election, Montana voters elect Ryan Zinke as the U.S. representative for the new 1st congressional district and U.S. representative at-large Matt Rosendale for the new 2nd Congressional District. Republicans retain control of the Montana Legislature.
2020	November 3	In the 2020 General Election, Montana voters elect three presidential electors for Donald Trump, re-elect Steve Daines as junior U.S. Senator, elect Matt Rosendale as U.S. representative at-large, and elect Greg Gianforte as Governor. Republicans retain control of the Montana Legislature.
2020	April 1	The 2020 United States census enumerates the population of the State of Montana, later determined to be 1,084,225, an increase of 9.58% since the 2010 United States census. Montana remains the 44th most populous of the 50 U.S. states, but will gain a second Congressional seat.

== 2010s ==
Year	Date	Event
2019	December 2	Governor Steve Bullock announces the end of his campaign for President of the United States.
2019	January 7	Governor Steve Bullock announces his candidacy for President of the United States.
2018	December 15	Ryan Zinke resigns as United States Secretary of the Interior following congressional investigations.
2018	November 6	In the 2018 General Election, Montana voters re-elect Jon Tester as senior U.S. Senator and elect Greg Gianforte as U.S. representative at-large. Republicans retain control of the Montana Legislature.
2018	October 18	At a political rally in Missoula, U.S. President Donald Trump congratulates Congressman Greg Gianforte for his assault of reporter Ben Jacobs.
2017	May 25	In the special congressional replacement election, Montana voters elect Greg Gianforte U.S. representative at-large.
2017	May 24	Congressional candidate Greg Gianforte assaults reporter Ben Jacobs.
2017	March 1	U.S. representative at-large Ryan Zinke is confirmed and assumes office as United States Secretary of the Interior.
2016	November 8	In the 2016 general election, Montana voters elect three presidential electors for Donald Trump, re-elect Ryan Zinke as U.S. representative at-large, and re-elect Steve Bullock as Governor. Republicans retain control of the Montana Legislature.
2015	January 3	Steve Daines assumes office as the junior United States senator for the State of Montana.
2014	November 4	In the 2014 General Election, Montana voters elect Steve Daines as junior U.S. Senator and elect Ryan Zinke as U.S. representative at-large. Republicans retain control of the Montana Legislature.
2013	January 7	Steve Bullock assumes office as the 24th governor of the State of Montana.
2012	November 6	In the 2012 general election, Montana voters elect three presidential electors for Mitt Romney, re-elect Jon Tester as senior U.S. Senator, elect Steve Daines as U.S. representative at-large, and elect Steve Bullock as governor. Republicans retain control of the Montana Legislature.
2010	November 2	In the 2010 general election, Montana voters re-elect Denny Rehberg as U.S. representative at-large. Republicans retain control of the Montana Senate and regain control of the Montana House of Representatives.
2010	April 1	The 2010 United States census enumerates the population of the State of Montana, later determined to be 989,415, an increase of 9.7% since the 2000 United States census. Montana remains the 44th most populous of the 50 U.S. states.

== 2000s ==
Year	Date	Event
2009	March 30	U.S. President Barack Obama signs An Act to designate certain land as components of the National Wilderness Preservation System, to authorize certain programs and activities in the Department of the Interior and the Department of Agriculture, and for other purposes, creating the Pacific Northwest National Scenic Trail and the Ice Age Floods National Geologic Trail.
2007	January 3	Jon Tester assumes office as the junior United States senator for the State of Montana.
2005	January 3	Brian Schweitzer assumes office as the 23rd Governor of the State of Montana.
2001	January 17	U.S. President Bill Clinton issues an executive orders creating Pompeys Pillar National Monument and Upper Missouri River Breaks National Monument.
2001	January 1	Judy Martz assumes office as the 22nd Governor of the State of Montana.
2000	April 1	The 2000 United States census enumerates the population of the State of Montana, later determined to be 902,195, an increase of 12.9% since the 1990 United States census. Montana remains the 44th most populous of the 50 U.S. states.

== 1990s ==
Year	Date	Event
1995	December 9	The United Nations Educational, Scientific and Cultural Organization (UNESCO) designates Waterton-Glacier International Peace Park as a World Heritage Site.
1993	January 4	Marc Racicot assumes office as the 21st Governor of the State of Montana.
1992	October 30	U.S. President George H. W. Bush signs An Act to amend the Act of May 15, 1965, authorizing the Secretary of the Interior to designate the Nez Perce National Historical Park in the State of Idaho, and for other purposes. The Nez Perce National Historical Park now includes the Big Hole National Battlefield and the Bear Paw Battlefield in Montana.
1991	December 10	U.S. President George H. W. Bush signs An Act of Congress changing the name of the Custer Battlefield National Monument to the Little Bighorn Battlefield National Monument.
1990	April 1	The 1990 United States census enumerates the population of the State of Montana, later determined to be 786,690, an increase of 1.6% since the 1980 United States census. Montana remains the 44th most populous of the 50 U.S. states, but will lose its 2nd Congressional District.

== 1980s ==
Year	Date	Event
1989	January 2	Stan Stephens assumes office as the 20th Governor of the State of Montana.
1986	October 6	U.S. President Ronald Reagan signs An Act to amend the National Trails System Act by designating the Nez Perce (Nee-Me-Poo) Trail as a component of the National Trails System, creating the Nez Perce National Historic Trail.
1981	January 5	Ted Schwinden assumes office as the 19th Governor of the State of Montana.
1980	April 1	The 1980 United States census enumerates the population of the State of Montana, later determined to be 786,690, an increase of 13.3% since the 1970 United States census. Montana becomes the 44th most populous of the 50 U.S. states.

== 1970s ==
Year	Date	Event
1978	November 10	U.S. President Jimmy Carter signs the National Parks and Recreation Act of 1978 authorizing the Lewis and Clark National Historic Trail and the Continental Divide National Scenic Trail.
1978	October 9	The United Nations Educational, Scientific and Cultural Organization (UNESCO) designates Yellowstone National Park as one of the first 12 World Heritage Sites.
1976	July 4	The State of Montana celebrates the Bicentennial of the United States of America.
1973	January 1	Thomas Lee Judge assumes office as the 18th Governor of the State of Montana.
1972	August 25	U.S. President Richard Nixon signs An Act to authorize the establishment of the Grant Kohrs Ranch National Historic Site in the State of Montana, and for other purposes.
1970	April 1	The 1970 United States census enumerates the population of the State of Montana, later determined to be 694,409, an increase of 2.9% since the 1960 United States census. Montana becomes the 43rd most populous of the 50 U.S. states.

== 1960s ==
Year	Date	Event
1969	January 6	Forrest H. Anderson assumes office as the 17th Governor of the State of Montana.
1968	December 2	U.S. President Lyndon B. Johnson signs An Act to establish a national trails system, and for other purposes, creating the National Trails System.
1966	October 15	U.S. President Lyndon B. Johnson signs An Act to provide for the establishment of the Bighorn Canyon National Recreation Area, and for other purposes.
1966	June 20	The National Park Service establishes Fort Union Trading Post National Historic Site.
1965	July 1	The State of Montana changes the name of the Agricultural College of the State of Montana to Montana State University.
1964	June 7	Heavy rains lead to floods. Areas west of the Divide receive the most damage. President Johnson declares Montana a National Disaster Area. Damages are assessed at $62 million and 34 people died.
1963	May 17	U.S. President John F. Kennedy signs An Act to redesignate the Big Hole Battlefield National Monument, to revise the boundaries thereof, and for other purposes, changing the name of Big Hole Battlefield National Monument to Big Hole National Battlefield.
1962	January 25	Lieutenant Governor Tim Babcock assumes office as the 16th Governor of the State of Montana
1961	January 2	Donald Grant Nutter assumes office as the 15th Governor of the State of Montana.
1960	April 1	The 1960 United States census enumerates the population of the State of Montana, later determined to be 674,767, an increase of 14.2% since the 1950 United States census. Montana becomes the 41st most populous of the 50 U.S. states.

== 1950s ==
Year	Date	Event
1953	January 5	J. Hugo Aronson assumes office as the 14th Governor of the State of Montana.
1950	April 1	The 1950 United States census enumerates the population of the State of Montana, later determined to be 591,024, an increase of 5.6% since the 1940 United States census. Montana becomes the 42nd most populous of the 48 U.S. states.

== 1940s ==
Year	Date	Event
1949	January 3	John W. Bonner assumes office as the 13th Governor of the State of Montana.
1946	March 22	Custer Battlefield National Monument.
1945	September 2	World War II ends as the Empire of Japan formally surrenders.
1945	May 8	The war in Europe ends as the Greater German Empire formally surrenders.
1941	December 11	The United States declares war on the German Reich and the Italian Empire.
1941	December 8	The United States declares war on the Empire of Japan and enters World War II.
1941	January 6	Sam C. Ford assumes office as the 12th Governor of the State of Montana.
1940	April 1	The 1940 United States census enumerates the population of the State of Montana, later determined to be 559,456, an increase of 4.1% since the 1930 United States census. Montana remains the 39th most populous of the 48 U.S. states.

== 1930s ==
Year	Date	Event
1937	August 24	U.S. President Franklin D. Roosevelt signs An Act authorizing the Secretary of the Interior to convey certain land to the State of Montana to be used for the purposes of a public park and recreational site, transferring Lewis and Clark Cavern National Monument to the State of Montana to become Lewis and Clark Caverns State Park.
1937	July 22	U.S. President Franklin D. Roosevelt signs An Act to create the Farmers' Home Corporation, to promote more secure occupancy of farms and farm homes, to correct the economic instability resulting from some present forms of farm tenancy, and for other purposes, also known as the Bankhead-Jones Farm Tenant Act.
1937	January 4	Roy E. Ayers assumes office as the 11th Governor of the State of Montana.
1935	December 15	President of the Montana Senate Elmer Holt assumes office as the tenth Governor of the State of Montana upon the death of Governor Frank Henry Cooney.
1933	March 13	Lieutenant Governor Frank Henry Cooney assumes office as the ninth Governor of the State of Montana upon the resignation of Governor John E. Erickson.
1932	June 18	The United States of America and Canada create the Waterton-Glacier International Peace Park.
1930	April 1	The 1930 United States census enumerates the population of the State of Montana, later determined to be 537,606, a decrease of -2.1% since the 1920 United States census. Montana remains the 39th most populous of the 48 U.S. states.

== 1920s ==
Year	Date	Event
1925	January 4	John E. Erickson assumes office as the eighth Governor of the State of Montana.
1924	November 24	The State of Montana creates Petroleum County.
1924	June 2	U.S. President Calvin Coolidge signs An Act To authorize the Secretary of the Interior to issue certificates of citizenship to Indians, also known as the Indian Citizenship Act of 1924, finally granting full United States Citizenship to all Native Americans born in the United States.
1923	May 11	The State of Montana creates Lake County.
1921	January 3	Joseph M. Dixon assumes office as the seventh Governor of the State of Montana.
1920	December 10	The State of Montana creates Judith Basin County.
1920	October 4	The State of Montana creates Golden Valley County.
1920	August 30	The State of Montana creates Daniels County.
1920	April 1	The 1920 United States census enumerates the population of the State of Montana, later determined to be 548,889, an increase of 46.0% since the 1910 United States census. Montana becomes the 39th most populous of the 48 U.S. states.
1920	February 11	The State of Montana creates Liberty County.

== 1910s ==
Year	Date	Event
1919	March 7	The State of Montana creates Powder River County.
1919	February 20	The State of Montana creates McCone County.
1919	February 18	The State of Montana creates Roosevelt County.
1919	February 17	The State of Montana creates Glacier County and Pondera County.
1919	February 7	The State of Montana creates Garfield County and Treasure County.
1918	November 11	An armistice halts the Great War.
1917	April 6	The United States declares war on the German Empire and enters the Great War.
1917	February 22	The State of Montana creates Carter County and Wheatland County.
1916	August 25	U.S. President Woodrow Wilson signs An Act To establish a National Park Service, and for other purposes.
1915	February 5	The State of Montana creates Phillips County and Prairie County.
1914	August 17	The State of Montana creates Wibaux County.
1914	August 7	The State of Montana creates Mineral County.
1914	May 27	The State of Montana creates Richland County.
1914	May 7	The State of Montana creates Toole County.
1913	December 9	The State of Montana creates Fallon County.
1913	March 24	The State of Montana creates Sheridan County and Stillwater County.
1913	January 13	The State of Montana creates Big Horn County.
1913	January 6	Sam V. Stewart assumes office as the sixth Governor of the State of Montana.
1912	February 29	The State of Montana creates Blaine County.
1912	February 28	The State of Montana creates Hill County.
1911	February 11	The State of Montana creates Musselshell County.
1910	August 20	Forests in the Bitterroot Mountains burn after sparks from small fires spread. More than 3 million acres burn until the fire is doused on September 4th. The area is nicknamed the "Great Burn".
1910	June 23	U.S. President William Howard Taft issues a proclamation creating Big Hole Battlefield National Monument.
1910	May 11	U.S. President William Howard Taft signs An Act to establish "The Glacier National Park" in the Rocky Mountains south of the international boundary line, in the State of Montana, and for other purposes.
1910	April 1	The 1910 United States census enumerates the population of the State of Montana, later determined to be 376,053, an increase of 54.5% since the 1900 United States census. Montana becomes the 40th most populous of the 46 U.S. states and gains a second Congressional seat.

== 1900s ==
Year	Date	Event
1909	March 9	The State of Montana creates Lincoln County.
1908	July 2	U.S. President Theodore Roosevelt issues executive orders creating Jefferson National Forest, Custer National Forest, and Sioux National Forest.
1908	July 1	U.S. President Theodore Roosevelt issues an executive order re-establishing Absaroka National Forest.
1908	July 1	U.S. President Theodore Roosevelt issues executive orders creating Beaverhead National Forest, Deerlodge National Forest, and Bitterroot National Forest.
1908	June 30	U.S. President Theodore Roosevelt issues an executive order creating Beartooth National Forest.
1908	June 25	U.S. President Theodore Roosevelt issues executive orders creating Blackfeet National Forest and Flathead National Forest.
1908	April 1	Lieutenant Governor Edwin L. Norris assumes office as the fifth Governor of the State of Montana.
1907	March 2	U.S. President Theodore Roosevelt issues a proclamation renaming the Lewis & Clarke Forest Reserve as the Lewis & Clark Forest Reserve.
1907	March 2	U.S. President Theodore Roosevelt issues proclamations creating the Little Rockies Forest Reserve, the Cabinet Forest Reserve, and the Otter Forest Reserve.
1906	November 6	U.S. President Theodore Roosevelt issues proclamations creating the Little Belt Forest Reserve, the Pryor Mountains Forest Reserve, and the Missoula Forest Reserve.
1906	November 5	U.S. President Theodore Roosevelt issues proclamations creating the Ekalaka Forest Reserve, the Snowy Mountains Forest Reserve, and the Big Hole Forest Reserve.
1906	September 24	U.S. President Theodore Roosevelt issues a proclamation creating the Long Pine Forest Reserve.
1906	September 20	U.S. President Theodore Roosevelt issues a proclamation creating the Lolo Forest Reserve.
1906	August 13	U.S. President Theodore Roosevelt issues a proclamation creating the Kootenai Forest Reserve.
1906	August 10	U.S. President Theodore Roosevelt issues a proclamation creating the Crazy Mountains Forest Reserve.
1906	June 8	U.S. President Theodore Roosevelt signs An Act For the preservation of American antiquities, also known as the Antiquities Act of 1906, giving the President of the United States the authority to create national monuments on federal lands to protect significant natural, cultural, or scientific features.
1906	April 12	U.S. President Theodore Roosevelt issues a proclamation creating the Helena Forest Reserve.
1905	October 3	U.S. President Theodore Roosevelt issues proclamations creating the Big Belt Forest Reserve, the Hell Gate Forest Reserve, and the Little Belt Forest Reserve.
1905	May 12	U.S. President Theodore Roosevelt issues a proclamation creating the Elkhorn Forest Reserve.
1905	February 7	The State of Montana creates Sanders County.
1904	June 14	U.S. President Theodore Roosevelt issues a proclamation creating the Bitter Root Forest Reserve.
1903	January 29	U.S. President Theodore Roosevelt issues a proclamation creating the Highwood Mountains Forest Reserve.
1903	January 29	U.S. President Theodore Roosevelt issues a proclamation consolidating the Absaroka Forest Reserve into the Yellowstone Forest Reserve.
1902	September 4	U.S. President Theodore Roosevelt issues a proclamation creating the Absaroka Forest Reserve. (Abolished January 29, 1903, but re-established July 1, 1908.)
1902	August 16	U.S. President Theodore Roosevelt issues proclamations creating the Little Belt Mountains Forest Reserve and the Madison Forest Reserve.
1901	February 11	The State of Montana creates Rosebud County.
1901	January 31	The State of Montana creates Powell County.
1901	January 7	Joseph Toole assumes office as the fourth Governor of the State of Montana.
1900	April 1	The 1900 United States census enumerates the population of the State of Montana, later determined to be 243,329, an increase of 70.3% since the 1890 United States census. Montana becomes the 41st most populous of the 45 U.S. states.

== 1890s ==
Year	Date	Event
1899	February 10	U.S. President Grover Cleveland issues a proclamation creating the Gallatin Forest Reserve.
1898	December 10	The United States of America and the Kingdom of Spain sign the Treaty of Paris of 1898 to end the Spanish–American War.
1898	August 12	The United States of America and the Kingdom of Spain sign a Protocol of Peace.
1898	April 23	The Kingdom of Spain declares war on the United States of America. The United States declares war on Spain two days later.
1897	February 22	U.S. President Grover Cleveland issues a proclamation creating the Bitter Root Forest Reserve, the Lewis & Clarke Forest Reserve, and the Flathead Forest Reserve.
1897	February 9	The State of Montana creates Broadwater County.
1897	January 4	Robert Burns Smith assumes office as the third Governor of the State of Montana.
1895	March 5	The State of Montana creates Sweet Grass County.
1895	March 4	The State of Montana creates Carbon County.
1893	March 2	The State of Montana creates Granite County.
1893	February 16	The State of Montana creates Ravalli County.
1893	February 16	The State of Montana founds the Agricultural College of the State of Montana.
1893	February 13	The State of Montana founds the University of Montana.
1893	February 7	The State of Montana creates Teton County.
1893	February 6	The State of Montana creates Flathead County and Valley County.
1893	January 2	John E. Rickards assumes office as the second Governor of the State of Montana.
1891	March 3	U.S. President Benjamin Harrison signs An act to repeal timber-culture laws, and for other purposes, also known as the Forest Reserve Act of 1891, giving the President of the United States the authority to create protected national forests on federal lands.
1890	April 1	The 1890 United States census enumerates the population of the State of Montana, later determined to be 142,924, an increase of 265.0% since the 1880 United States census. Montana becomes the 41st most populous of the 43 U.S. states.

== 1880s ==
Year	Date	Event
1889	November 8	Joseph Toole assumes office as the first Governor of the State of Montana.
1889	November 8	U.S. President Benjamin Harrison issues Proclamation 293—Admission of Montana into the Union. The Territory of Montana becomes the State of Montana, the 41st U.S. state.
1889	April 9	U.S. President Benjamin Harrison appoints Benjamin F. White the ninth (and last) Governor of the Territory of Montana.
1889	February 22	U.S. President Grover Cleveland signs An Act to provide for the division of Dakota into two States and to enable the people of North Dakota, South Dakota, Montana, and Washington to form constitutions and State governments and to be admitted into the Union on an equal footing with the original States, and to make donations of public lands to such States.
1887	September 12	The Territory of Montana creates Cascade County.
1887	February 23	The Territory of Montana creates Park County.
1887	February 8	U.S. President Grover Cleveland appoints Preston Leslie the eighth Governor of the Territory of Montana.
1885	July 14	U.S. President Grover Cleveland appoints Samuel Thomas Hauser the seventh Governor of the Territory of Montana.
1885	March 12	The Territory of Montana creates Fergus County.
1884	December 16	U.S. President Chester A. Arthur appoints B. Platt Carpenter the sixth Governor of the Territory of Montana.
1883	July 13	U.S. President Chester A. Arthur appoints John Schuyler Crosby the fifth Governor of the Territory of Montana.
1883	February 26	The Territory of Montana creates Yellowstone County.
1881	February 16	The Territory of Montana creates Silver Bow County.
1880	April 1	The 1880 United States census enumerates the population of the Territory of Montana, later determined to be 39,159, an increase of 90.1% since the 1880 United States census. Montana becomes the sixth most populous of the eight U.S. territories.

== 1870s ==
Year	Date	Event
1877	September 30	U.S. soldiers under the command of General Oliver Otis Howard attack Nez Perce people led by Chief Joseph attempting to flee to Canada in the Battle of Bear Paw. Chief Joseph and many Nez Perce are captured.
1877	September 13	U.S. soldiers under the command of Colonel Samuel D. Sturgis attack Nez Perce people attempting to flee to Canada in the Battle of Canyon Creek.
1877	August 9	U.S. soldiers under the command of Colonel John Gibbon attack Nez Perce people encamped in the Bitterroot Valley in the Battle of the Big Hole.
1877	February 16	The Territory of Montana changes the name of Big Horn County to Custer County in honor of Lieutenant Colonel George Armstrong Custer.
1876	July 4	The Territory of Montana celebrates the Centennial of the United States of America while still reeling from the Battle of the Little Bighorn.
1876	June 26	The 7th Cavalry Regiment under the command of Lieutenant Colonel George Armstrong Custer are defeated at the Battle of the Little Bighorn by a force of Lakota, Northern Cheyenne, and Arapaho warriors.
1875	April 19	The Territory of Montana selects Helena as the third Territorial Capital. Helena remains the capital of Montana.
1872	March 1	U.S. President Ulysses S. Grant signs An Act to set apart a certain tract of land lying near the headwaters of the Yellowstone River as a public park, creating Yellowstone National Park, the world's first national park.
1870	July 13	U.S. President Ulysses S. Grant appoints Benjamin F. Potts the fourth Governor of the Territory of Montana.
1870	April 1	The 1870 United States census enumerates the population of the Territory of Montana, later determined to be 20,595. Montana is the sixth most populous of the nine U.S. territories.

== 1860s ==
Year	Date	Event
1869	April 9	U.S. President Ulysses S. Grant appoints James Mitchell Ashley the third Governor of the Territory of Montana.
1869	January 15	The Territory of Montana creates Dawson County.
1868	March 1	The Territory of Montana changes the name of Edgerton County to Lewis and Clark County in honor of Meriwether Lewis and William Clark.
1867	November 16	The Territory of Montana creates Meagher County.
1866	October 3	U.S. President Andrew Johnson appoints Green Clay Smith the second Governor of the Territory of Montana.
1865	February 7	The Territory of Montana selects Virginia City as the second Territorial Capital.
1865	February 2	The Territory of Montana creates nine original counties: Beaverhead County, Big Horn County, Chouteau County, Deer Lodge County, Edgerton County, Gallatin County, Jefferson County, Madison County, and Missoula County.
1864	October 30	The gold camp of Helena is established.
1864	September	Territorial Governor Sidney Edgerton arrives in Bannack, Montana Territory.
1864	July 14	Four miners from the State of Georgia discover gold at Last Chance Gulch.
1864	June 22	U.S. President Abraham Lincoln appoints Sidney Edgerton the first Governor of the Territory of Montana.
1864	May 28	The provisional Montana Territorial Legislature selects Bannack as the first Territorial Capital.
1864	May 26	U.S. President Abraham Lincoln signs An Act to provide a temporary Government for the Territory of Montana.
1863	June 16	The Virginia City Mining District is established in the Territory of Idaho.
1863	May 26	Bill Fairweather and Henry Edgar discover gold along Alder Creek in the Territory of Idaho.
1863	March 3	U.S. President Abraham Lincoln signs An Act to provide a temporary Government for the Territory of Idaho. The Territory of Idaho includes all of the future State of Montana.
1862	July 28	Gold is discovered along Grasshopper Creek in the Territory of Dakota. Bannack City is established nearby.
1861	April 12	The American Civil War begins with the Battle of Fort Sumter.
1861	March 4	Abraham Lincoln assumes office as the 16th President of the United States.
1861	March 2	Outgoing U.S. President James Buchanan signs the An Act to provide a temporary government for the Territory of Dakota, and to create the office of surveyor general therein. The Territory of Dakota includes all of the future State of Montana east of the Continental Divide of the Americas.
1861	February 8	The seven secessionist slave states create the Confederate States of America.
1860	November 6	Abraham Lincoln is elected President of the United States. Seven slave states will secede from the United States of America before February 8, 1861.
1860	July 2	The steamboats "Chippewa" and "Key West" arrive at the head of navigation of the Missouri River at Fort Benton, Montana.
1860		The United States Government completes the Mullan Road between Fort Benton and Walla Walla, Washington.
1860		Francis Lyman Worden and Captain Christopher P. Higgins found the settlement of Hell Gate near the future site of Missoula, Montana.

== 1850s ==
Year	Date	Event
1858	May 12	Brothers James and Granville Stuart discover gold at Gold Creek near the future site of Drummond, Montana.
1855	July 16	Isaac Stevens, the first Governor of the Territory of Washington, concludes the Hellgate treaty with Bitterroot Salish, Pend d'Oreille and Kutenai chiefs to establish the Jocko Reservation.
1854	May 30	U.S. President Franklin Pierce signs An Act to Organize the Territories of Nebraska and Kansas. The Territory of Nebraska includes all of the future State of Montana east of the Continental Divide of the Americas.
1853	March 2	U.S. President Millard Fillmore signs An Act to establish the Territorial Government of Washington. The Territory of Washington includes the portion of the future State of Montana lying west of the Continental Divide of the Americas. The rest of the future state remains unorganized United States territory.
1852	summer	Trapper Francois Finlay discovers flakes of gold in Benetsee Creek (later Gold Creek) in the Territory of Oregon.

== 1840s ==
Year	Date	Event
1848	August 14	U.S. President James K. Polk signs An Act to Establish the Territorial Government of Oregon. The Territory of Oregon includes the portion of the future State of Montana lying west of the Continental Divide of the Americas. The rest of the future state remains unorganized United States territory.
1848	February 2	The United States of America and United Mexican States sign the Treaty of Guadalupe Hidalgo to end the Mexican–American War.
1846	July 17	The Oregon Treaty between the United States of America and the United Kingdom of Great Britain and Ireland takes effect. The 49th parallel north is set as the international border from the Strait of Georgia to the Lake of the Woods. All land in the future State of Montana becomes unorganized United States territory.
1846	May 13	The United States declares war on the Mexican Republic.
1846		Alexander Culbertson establishes Fort Benton, the last fur trading post on the Upper Missouri River.
1841	September 24	French Jesuit priest Pierre Jean DeSmet arrives in the Bitterroot Valley and establishes St. Mary's Mission, the first Euro-American settlement in the future State of Montana

== 1830s ==
Year	Date	Event
1832	spring	The steamship Yellowstone makes its inaugural voyage from St. Louis to Fort Union and back.

== 1820s ==
Year	Date	Event
1828	spring	The American Fur Company establishes Fort Union on the Missouri River near its confluence with the Yellowstone River.
1822	March 10	William Henry Ashley forms the Rocky Mountain Fur Company in St. Louis. The company operates it in Wyoming and Montana for twelve years. Jim Bridger, William Sublette and Jedediah Smith are among its corps of trappers.
1821	August 10	The State of Missouri is admitted to the Union. The rest of the Territory of Missouri becomes unorganized United States territory.
1821	March 2	U.S. President James Monroe signs An Act to authorize the people of the Missouri territory to form a constitution and state government, and for the admission of such state into the Union on an equal footing with the original states, and to prohibit slavery in certain territories.

== 1810s ==
Year	Date	Event
1819	January 30	The Treaty of 1818 between the United States of America and the United Kingdom of Great Britain and Ireland takes effect. The treaty calls for the joint occupation of the Oregon Country west of the Continental Divide of the Americas, and the 49th parallel north as the international border east of the Continental Divide to the Lake of the Woods. The Continental Divide separates the future State of Montana between the Oregon Country and the Territory of Missouri.
1814		William Clark publishes A Map of Lewis and Clark's Track Across the Western Portion of North America.
1812	October 1	The Territory of Missouri creates St. Charles County which includes all land in the future State of Montana in the Missouri River watershed.
1812	June 4	U.S. President James Madison signs An Act providing for the government of the territory of Missouri. The Territory of Louisiana is renamed the Territory of Missouri. The Territory of Missouri includes all land in the future State of Montana in the Missouri River watershed.
1810	February 26	Canadian fur trader and explorer David Thompson encounters Bitterroot Salish Indians wintering on the Flathead River below Flathead Lake.

== 1800s ==
Year	Date	Event
1809	November 9	Canadian fur trader and explorer David Thompson establishes Saleesh House at Thompson Falls on the Columbia River.
1807	November 21	Fur trader Manuel Lisa establishes Fort Raymond at the confluence of the Big Horn River with the Yellowstone River.
1806	September 23	The Lewis and Clark Expedition arrives in St. Louis in the Territory of Louisiana (the future State of Missouri).
1806	August 11	The Lewis and Clark Expedition reunites at the confluence of the Yellowstone River with the Missouri River.
1806	July 7	William Clark and the other members of the Lewis and Clark Expedition cross the Continental Divide of the Americas at the saddle now known as Big Hole Pass.
1806	July 7	Meriwether Lewis and nine other members of the Lewis and Clark Expedition cross the Continental Divide of the Americas at the saddle now known as Lewis and Clark Pass.
1806	July 3	On their return east, Meriwether Lewis and William Clark decide to split their expedition to search for a shorter route to the Missouri River.
1806	March 22	The Lewis and Clark Expedition depart Fort Clatsop and begin their voyage back to the United States.
1805	December 7	The Lewis and Clark Expedition arrive at the site of their winter encampment on the south side of the Columbia River and begin the construction of Fort Clatsop.
1805	August 12	Meriwether Lewis and three other members of the Lewis and Clark Expedition cross the Continental Divide of the Americas at the saddle now known as Lemhi Pass and enter territory claimed by Native Americans, the Kingdom of Spain, the United Kingdom of Great Britain and Ireland, and the Russian Empire. The rest of the expedition will follow.
1805	June 13	The Lewis and Clark Expedition reaches the Great Falls of the Missouri River. It will take four weeks to portage the falls.
1805	April	The Lewis and Clark Expedition travels up the Missouri River and enters the future State of Montana.
1805	March 3	U.S. President Thomas Jefferson signs An Act further providing for the government of the district of Louisiana. The District of Louisiana is reorganized as the self-governing Territory of Louisiana. The Territory of Louisiana includes all land in the future State of Montana in the Missouri River watershed.
1804	October 1	The District of Louisiana is organized under the jurisdiction of the Territory of Indiana.
1804	May 21	The Lewis and Clark Expedition departs St. Charles in the District of Louisiana (the future State of Missouri) and begins its voyage up the Missouri River.
1804	March 26	U.S. President Thomas Jefferson signs An Act erecting Louisiana into two territories, and providing for the temporary government thereof. The portion of the Louisiana Purchase north of the 33rd parallel north is designated the military District of Louisiana.
1803	December 20	The French Republic turns its colony of La Louisiane over to the United States. All land in the future State of Montana in the Missouri River watershed becomes unorganized United States territory.
1803	April 30	The United States and the French Republic sign the Louisiana Purchase Treaty.
1800	October 1	Under pressure from Napoléon Bonaparte, the Kingdom of Spain (under Carlos IV) transfers the colony of la Luisiana back to the French Republic with the secret Third Treaty of San Ildefonso.

== 1780s ==
Year	Date	Event
1783	September 3	The Treaty of Paris is signed in Paris by representatives of King George III of Great Britain and representatives of the United States of America. The treaty affirms the independence of the United States and sets the Mississippi River as its western boundary.

== 1770s ==
Year	Date	Event
1776	July 4	Representatives of the thirteen United States of America sign the Declaration of Independence from the Kingdom of Great Britain.

== 1760s ==
Year	Date	Event
1762	November 13	Fearing the loss of its American territories in the Seven Years' War, the Kingdom of France (under Louis XV) transfers its colony of La Louisiane to the Kingdom of Spain (under Carlos III) with the secret Treaty of Fontainebleau.

== 1680s ==
Year	Date	Event
1682	April 9	René-Robert Cavelier, Sieur de La Salle, claims the Mississippi River and its watershed for the Kingdom of France and names the region La Louisiane in honor of King Louis XIV. The Mississippi Basin is later determined to be the fourth most extensive on Earth and includes lands inhabited by hundreds of thousands of native peoples and lands previously claimed by Spain, France, and England. The Louisiane claim includes all land in the future State of Montana east of the Continental Divide of the Americas. This will set up a rivalry among native peoples, France, Spain, and eventually the United States in the area.

== 1540s ==
Year	Date	Event
1541	June 28	A Spanish military expedition led by Hernando de Soto, Governor of Cuba, become the first Europeans to cross the Mississippi River.

== 1510s ==
Year	Date	Event
1513	September 29	Spanish conquistador Vasco Núñez de Balboa crosses the Isthmus of Panama and arrives on the shore of a sea that he names Mar del Sur (the South Sea, later named the Pacific Ocean). He claims the sea and all adjacent lands for the Queen of Castile. This includes the portion of the future State of Montana west of the Continental Divide of the Americas.

== 1490s ==
Year	Date	Event
1493	May 5	Pope Alexander VI (born Roderic de Borja in Valencia) issues the papal bull Inter caetera which splits the non-Christian world into two halves. The eastern half goes to the King of Portugal for his exploration, conquest, conversion, and exploitation. The western half (including all of North America) goes to the Queen of Castile and the King of Aragon for their exploration, conquest, conversion, and exploitation. The indigenous peoples of the Americas have no idea that any of these people exist.
1492	October 12	Genoese seaman Cristòffa Cómbo leading an expedition for Queen Isabella I of Castile lands on the Lucayan island of Guanahani that he renames San Salvador. This begins the Spanish conquest of the Americas.

== Before 1492 ==
Era	Event
c. 12,000 BCE	During a centuries long period of warming, ice-age Paleoamericans from Beringia begin using the ice-free corridor east of the Rocky Mountains to migrate throughout the Americas.

2000s 1900s 1800s Statehood Territory 1700s 1600s 1500s Before 1492

== See also ==
- History of Montana
  - Bibliography of Montana history
    - Bibliography of Yellowstone National Park
  - Territorial evolution of Montana
    - Territory of Montana
    - State of Montana
  - Timeline of pre-statehood Montana history
- Index of Montana-related articles
- List of cities and towns in Montana
- List of counties in Montana
- List of ghost towns in Montana
- List of governors of Montana
- List of Montana state legislatures
- List of places in Montana
- Outline of Montana
