= Lubrecht State Experimental Forest =

State forest in western Montana

- Lubrecht Experimental Forest
- Location within Montana Location within the United States
- Location: Missoula and Granite, Montana
- Nearest city: Missoula, MT
- Coordinates: 46°53′30″N 113°26′3″W
- Area: 20,306 acres (82.18 km^{2})
- Established: 1937
- Governing body: Montana Department of Natural Resources and Conservation

The Lubrecht State Experimental Forest is a 20,306-acre (8,218 ha) tract of protected land located in Missoula and Granite County, Montana, owned and managed by the W.A. Franke College of Forestry & Conservation, of the University of Montana.

== Land Use ==
Up until 1992, the W.A. Franke College of Forestry & Conservation had operated various programs that centered around spending either a quarter term or semester working within the boundaries of the forest to learn about forest management and to study the history of certain tracts of land used for logging decades prior. Today the Lubrecht Forest is used as a classroom by the W.A. Franke College to teach subjects such as forest ecology, controlled burns, and studies of surface and groundwater measurement. The forest also has lodging for university students and 12 miles of trails for cross-country skiing and hiking.

== Flora and Fauna ==
The Lubrecht Experimental Forest features four major types of trees, the Western larch, Douglas fir, Lodgepole and Ponderosa. The Forest is unique compared to other protected areas in the state in that it annually sells timber to the community to help fund the upkeep of the area.

Although the flora is the main focus of the Forest, there are still over 60 different species of wildlife in the area, including black bears, eagles, elk, and bobcats.

== History ==
From 1864 to 1937, the Lubrecht Forest was owned by the Northern Pacific Railroad, with some small tracts being sold off to the Anaconda Copper for the purpose of providing timber to be used in their mines. On December 24, 1937, the Anaconda Copper Company donated 19,058 acres to the state to be used by the university. The forest was named in for W.C. Lubrecht, the general manager of the Anaconda Company lumber operations. The Northern Pacific Railroad donated a further 1,210 acres two years later. The current acreage reflects small changes resulting in the buying and selling of parcels of land to and from private individuals.

== See also ==
- List of forests in Montana
