= Wyoming National Forest =

Former national forest in Wyoming

Wyoming National Forest was first established July 1, 1908 from part of Yellowstone National Forest with 976,320 acres (3,951.0 km^{2}). On May 14, 1923, the lands of the first Bridger National Forest were added, and on March 10, 1941, its name was changed to Bridger National Forest. In 1973 Bridger National Forest was administratively combined with Teton National Forest, creating Bridger-Teton National Forest.
