= Lump Gulch Fire =

2020 wildfire in Montana, United States

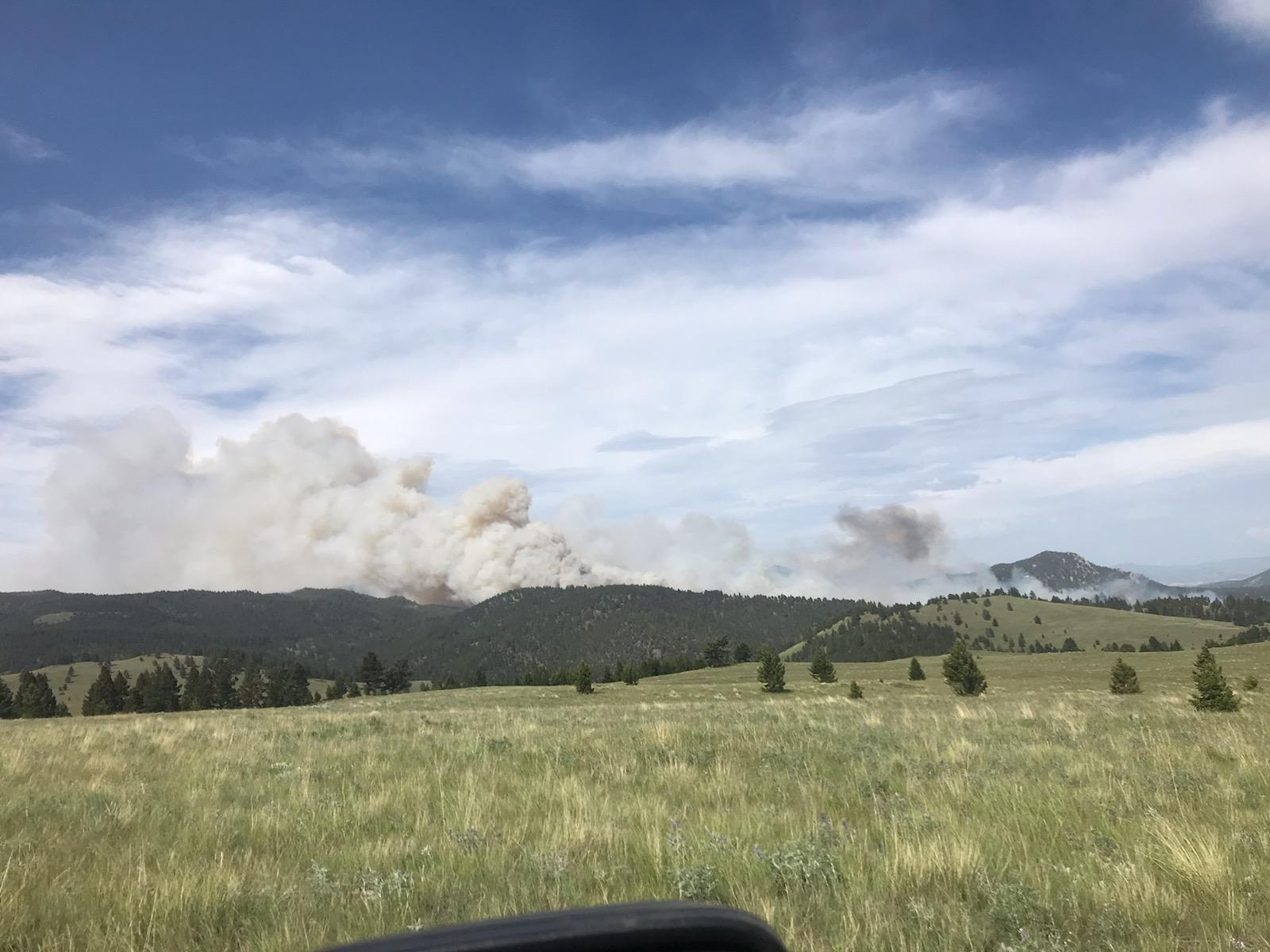
- Lump Gulch Fire on June 13, 2020
- Date: June 13, 2020–
- Location: Jefferson County, Montana, United States
- Coordinates: 46.482°N 112.057°W

Statistics
- Burned area: 1,079 acres (437 ha)

Impacts
- Structures destroyed: 2

Ignition
- Cause: Power line

Map
- Location in Montana

The Lump Gulch Fire was a wildfire that burned in Jefferson County in the state of Montana in the United States. The fire, which was first reported on June 13, 2020, was started by a downed power line. It burned in the Lewis and Clark National Forest, Helena National Forest, and on state and private land. As of June 23, the fire had burned 1,079 acres (437 ha) and was 85 percent contained. Two outbuildings were destroyed by the fire and select areas on National Forest land were closed due to the fire.

== Events ==
The Lump Gulch Fire was first reported as burning in or near Lump Gulch, a historic silver mining area near Sheep Mountain, around 3:00 PM on June 13, 2020. Upon initial aerial reports, the fire was estimated at approximately 1,500 acres (607 ha). The fire started during a wind storm, with the cause under investigation upon reporting. Evacuations were put in place for about 20 homes in the fire's vicinity. Burning in steep, rugged terrain with heavy dead and downed timber, the Lump Gulch Fire destroyed two outbuildings by the morning of June 14. Mandatory evacuations were lifted and pre-evacuation orders were put in place for Sheep Mountain, Ohio Gulch, Travis Gulch, Davis Gulch, Blue Sky Heights, Forest Park Estates, Jackson Creek, and Lump Gulch.

By June 15, the GNA Brooklyn Bridge Timber Sale Area was closed. The fire was reported at 15 percent contained, with crews focusing on building fire lines on the east and west sides of the fire, heading north. The fire footprint was re-evaluated to be an estimated 1,100 acres (445 ha) by June 16. Rain and high humidity helped quell the fire, with a winter storm warning being put in place for June 17. That day, pre-evacuation warnings were removed for all prior areas.

As of June 19, the fire had burned an estimated 1,073 acres (434 ha) and power lines were determined to be the cause of the fire. The fire has since been 85% contained.

== Impact ==
The wind storm on June 13 caused the Helena-Lewis and Clark County 911 Center to be overwhelmed as members of the public called about the winds and the wildfire, which was reported at 3 PM. The overwhelming number of phone calls required the manager of the call center to ask the public to not call unless it was an absolute emergency.

Upon the Lump Gulch Fire's discovery on June 13 by emergency crews, approximately 20 homes were evacuated. Evacuation orders were lifted the following day.

The GNA Brooklyn Bridge Timber Sale Area was indefinitely closed to allow fire crews to work in the area.
