= Flathead National Forest =

National forest in Montana, United States

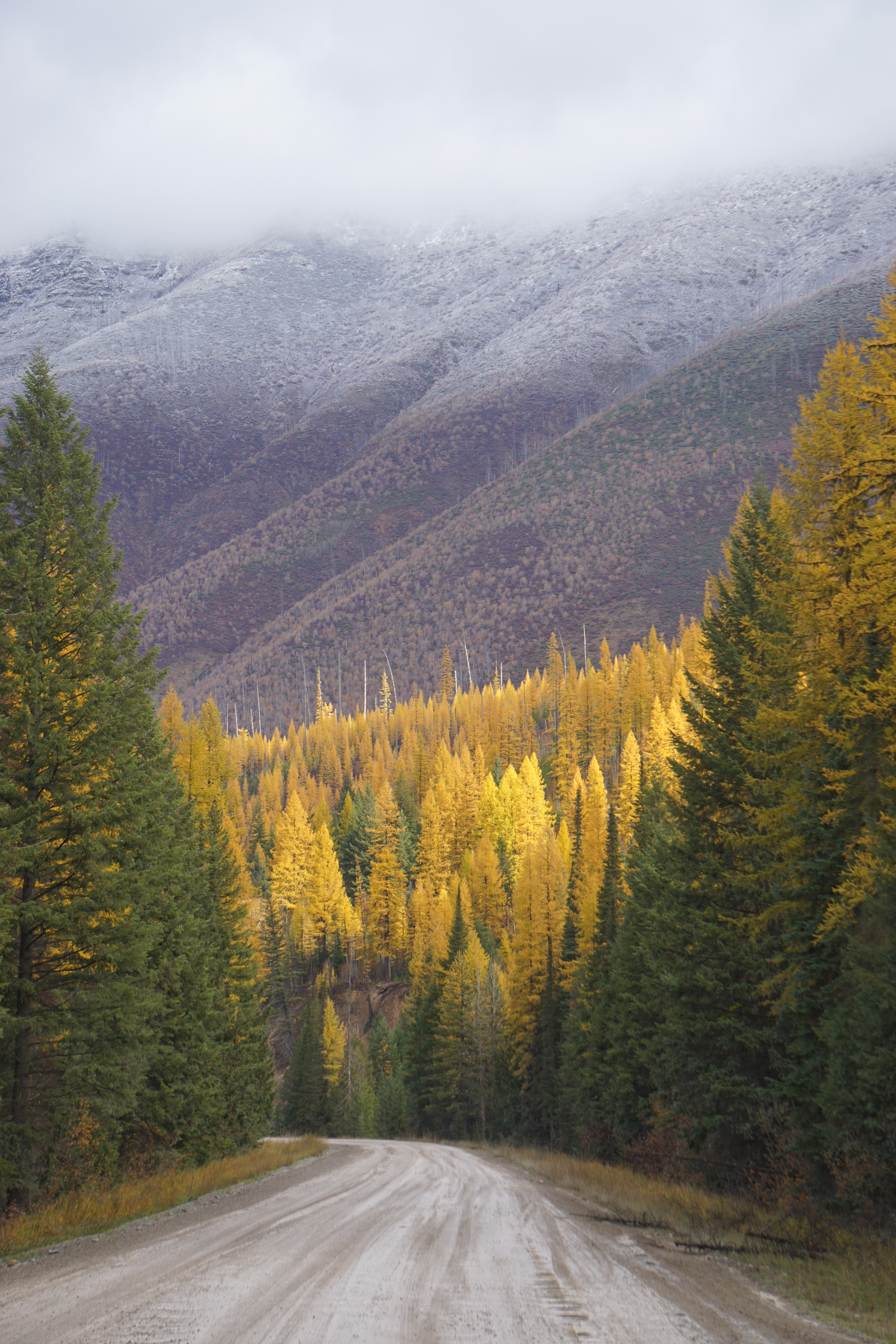
- The North Fork Road located in the Flathead National Forest.

- Location within the United States
- Location: Montana, USA
- Nearest city: Columbia Falls, Montana
- Coordinates: 48°02′N 113°48′W
- Area: 2,404,935 acres (9,732.43 km^{2})
- Established: February 22, 1897
- Governing body: U.S. Forest Service
- Website: Flathead National Forest

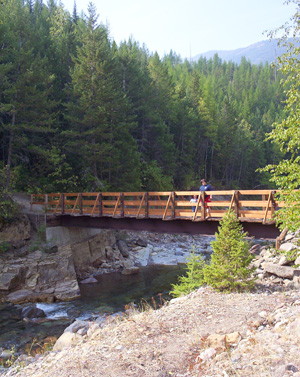
A trail bridge over Bear Creek

The Flathead National Forest is a national forest in the western part of the U.S. state of Montana. The forest lies primarily in Flathead County, south of Glacier National Park. The forest covers 2,404,935 acres (3,758 mi^{2}; 9,732 km^{2}) of which about 1 million acres (4,000 km^{2}) is designated wilderness. It is named after the Flathead Native Americans who live in the area.

== Description ==
The forest lies primarily in Flathead County (about 73% of its acreage), but smaller areas extend into five other counties. In descending order of land area they are Powell, Missoula, Lake, Lewis and Clark, and Lincoln counties. Forest headquarters are located in Kalispell, Montana. There are local ranger district offices in Bigfork, Hungry Horse, and Whitefish.

The Flathead National Forest is bordered by Glacier National Park and Canada to the north, the Helena-Lewis and Clark National Forest and Glacier to the east, the Lolo National Forest to the south, and the Kootenai National Forest to the west. The wilderness areas in the forest are the Bob Marshall Wilderness Area, Great Bear Wilderness Area, and Mission Mountains Wilderness Area. Other specially designated areas in the forest include Flathead Wild and Scenic River, Jewel Basin Hiking Area, and the Coram Experimental Forest. Some 270,000 acres (1,100 km^{2}) of non-federal land are also included in the boundaries drawn for the national forest. This includes private land, commercial forest and part or all of Swan River State Forest, Stillwater State Forest and Coal Creek State Forest.

The forest contains 1,700 miles (2,700 km) of roads, many of them primitive fire roads and 2,800 miles (4,500 km) of hiking trails. Approximately 38 miles (61 km) of the Pacific Northwest National Scenic Trail are located within the Flathead National Forest.

== Ecology ==
The forest is located in the Rocky Mountains with elevations ranging from 4,500 to 8,500 feet (1,400 to 2,600 m). The forest provides habitat for approximately 250 species of wildlife and 22 species of fish. This includes bald eagle, wolverine, beaver, elk, porcupine, cougar, moose, bobcat, white-tailed deer, coyote, grizzly bear, timber wolf, two species of fox, mountain goat, Canadian lynx, woodchuck, bighorn sheep and bull trout.

== Activities ==
Commercial activities in the non-wilderness sections of the forest include timber harvesting, two downhill ski resorts and a small amount of cattle grazing. Typically between 60 and 90 million board feet of timber is commercially each year. Individuals can pick less than 10 US gallons (38 L) of berries without a permit. Larger amounts of berries, firewood and Christmas tree cutting, and mushroom or mineral gathering in wilderness areas require permits.

While camping is allowed almost anywhere within national forests without a permit, Flathead National Forest also has 31 campgrounds with some facilities. The largest campground has only 40 sites and 2 campgrounds have only one site each. Most campgrounds do not have running water. There are also 14 cabins for rent in the forest.

== Points of interest ==
- Hungry Horse Dam is a 564-foot (172 m) tall dam that creates the 34-mile (55 km) long Hungry Horse Reservoir.
- Bob Marshall Wilderness Complex spans over 1.5 million acres (6,100 km^{2}), comprising the Bob Marshall Wilderness, the Great Bear Wilderness and the Scapegoat Wilderness.
- Whitefish Mountain Resort is a ski resort located on Big Mountain in the Flathead National Forest.
- Chinese Wall is a 22-mile (35 km) long, 1,000-foot (300 m) tall escarpment located in the Bob Marshall Wilderness Complex.
- Big Creek Ranger Station is listed on the National Register of Historic Places.
- Coram Experimental Forest is an 800-acre (3.2 km^{2}) experimental western larch forest located in the Flathead National Forest.

== See also ==
- List of national forests of the United States
- List of forests in Montana
