= List of forests in Montana =

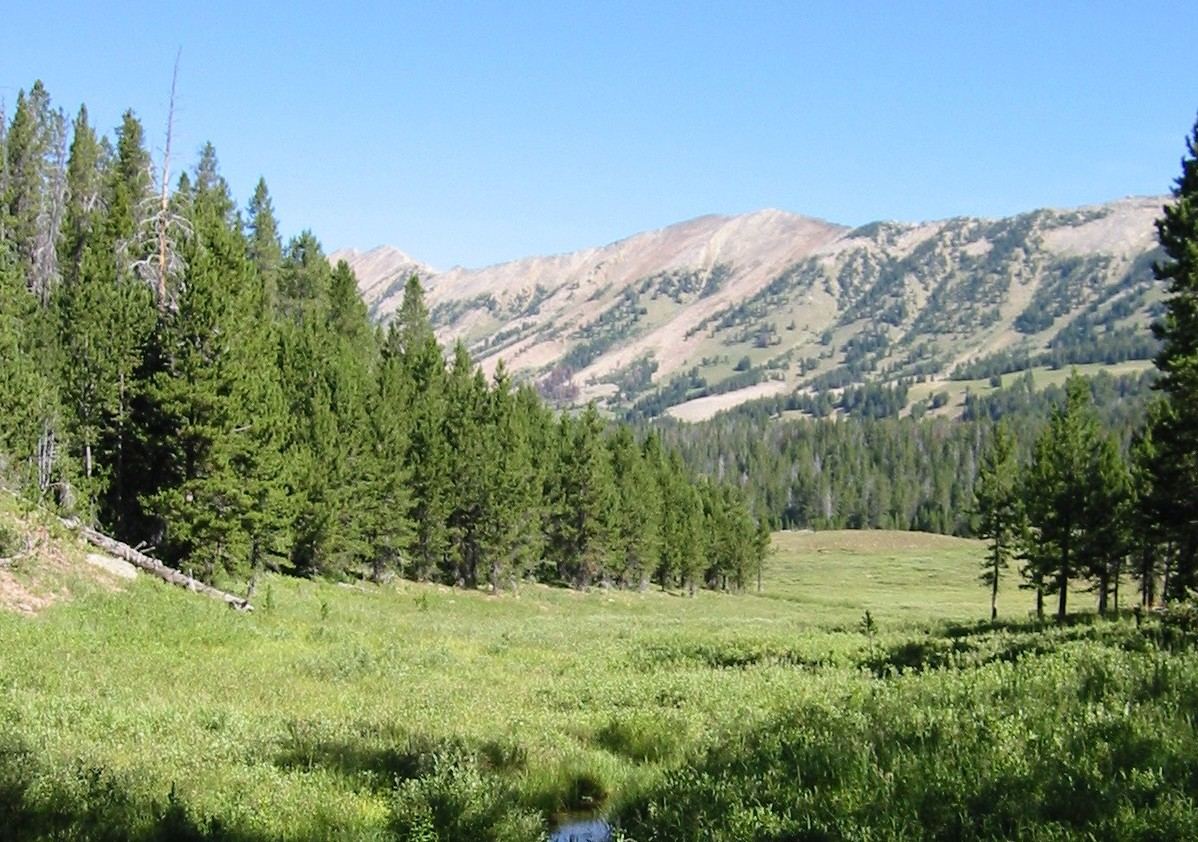
Cabin Creek, Gallatin National Forest

Based on the U.S. Board on Geographic Names, there are at least 20 named national and state forests in Montana. In addition to currently named forests, there are at least 22 former named forests that have been consolidated into current forest lands.

National forests are administered by the United States Forest Service, an agency of the United States Department of Agriculture. Montana state forests are administered by the Montana Department of Natural Resources and Conservation.

== Current forests ==
=== State forests ===
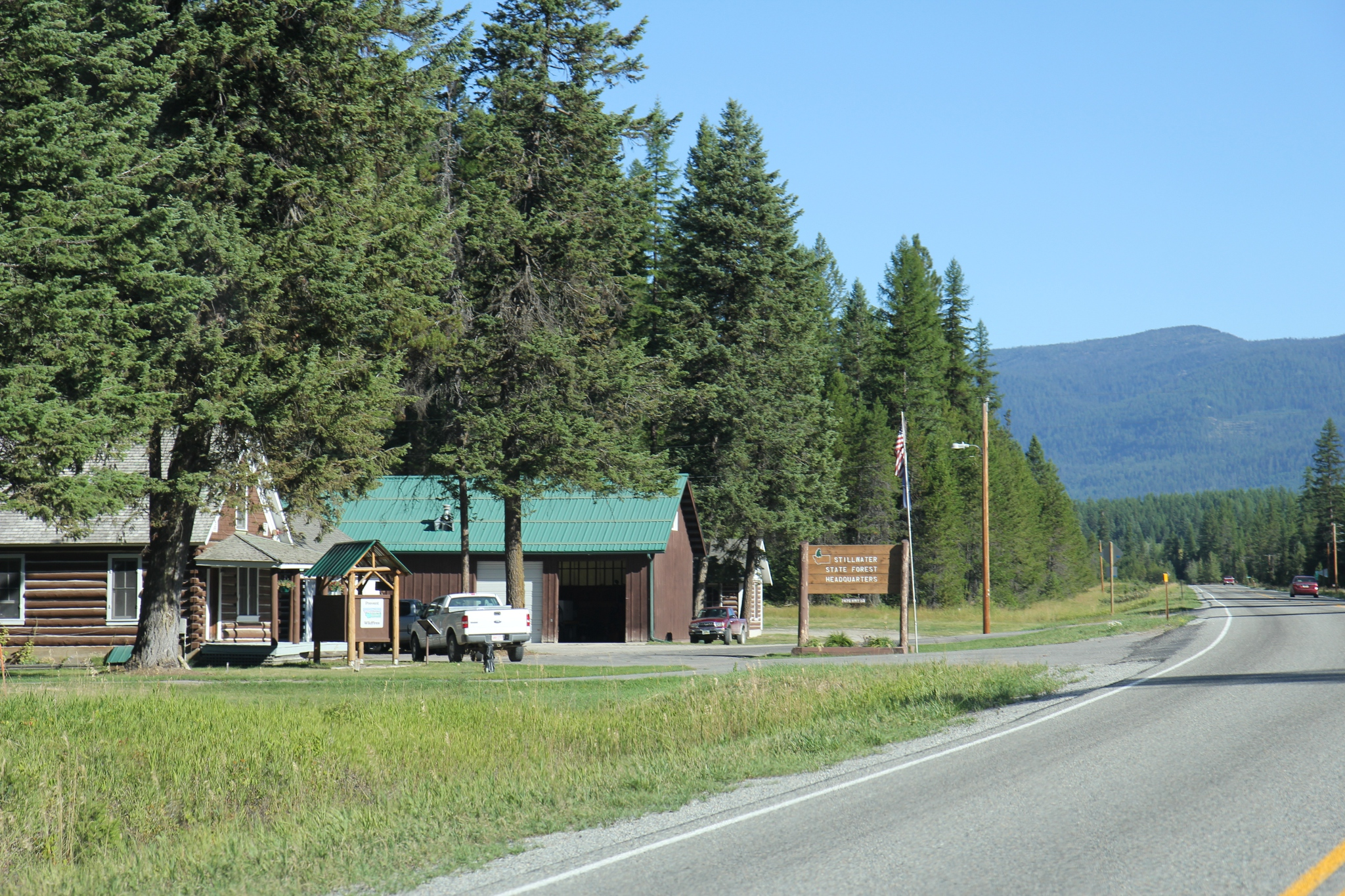
Headquarters for Stillwater State Forest

- Clearwater State Forest, Missoula County, Montana, 46°55′59″N 113°24′27″W, el. 3,802 feet (1,159 m)
- Coal Creek State Forest, Flathead County, Montana, 48°41′37″N 114°17′32″W, el. 4,357 feet (1,328 m)
- Lincoln State Forest, Lewis and Clark County, Montana, 46°56′00″N 112°41′23″W, el. 4,544 feet (1,385 m)
- Stillwater State Forest, Flathead County, Montana, 48°40′16″N 114°34′57″W, el. 4,544 feet (1,385 m)
- Sula State Forest, Ravalli County, Montana, 45°57′00″N 113°57′33″W, el. 5,321 feet (1,622 m)
- Swan River State Forest, Lake County, Montana, 47°46′08″N 113°53′34″W, el. 4,475 feet (1,364 m)
- Thompson River State Forest, Sanders County, Montana, 47°41′56″N 114°58′29″W, el. 3,399 feet (1,036 m)

=== National forests ===
- Beaverhead National Forest, Beaverhead County, Montana, 45°30′01″N 113°00′04″W, el. 8,812 feet (2,686 m)
- Bitterroot National Forest, Ravalli County, Montana, 45°55′00″N 114°17′03″W, el. 5,853 feet (1,784 m)
- Custer National Forest, Powder River County, Montana, 45°30′01″N 106°00′03″W, el. 3,622 feet (1,104 m)
- Deerlodge National Forest, Jefferson County, Montana, 46°05′00″N 112°20′03″W, el. 7,424 feet (2,263 m)
- Flathead National Forest, Flathead County, Montana, 47°45′01″N 113°30′04″W, el. 5,177 feet (1,578 m)
- Gallatin National Forest, Park County, Montana, 45°15′01″N 111°00′04″W, el. 8,793 feet (2,680 m)
- Gallatin Petrified Forest, Gallatin County, Montana, 45°07′10″N 111°06′08″W, el. 8,753 feet (2,668 m)
- Helena National Forest, Lewis and Clark County, Montana, 46°33′00″N 112°12′03″W, el. 5,059 feet (1,542 m)
- Kaniksu National Forest, Sanders County, Montana, 48°04′00″N 115°48′19″W, el. 2,247 feet (685 m)
- Kootenai National Forest, Lincoln County, Montana, 48°32′30″N 115°25′04″W, el. 4,924 feet (1,501 m)
- Lewis and Clark National Forest, Meagher County, Montana, 46°55′00″N 110°38′03″W, el. 6,647 feet (2,026 m)
- Lolo National Forest, Sanders County, Montana, 47°35′00″N 115°35′04″W, el. 5,302 feet (1,616 m)

=== Other forests ===
- The Lubrecht Experimental Forest is managed by the W.A. Franke College of Forestry & Conservation at the University of Montana. The forest is in Missoula County, Montana, 46°53′30″N 113°26′03″W, el. 4,157 feet (1,267 m).

== Former national forests ==
- Absaroka National Forest, now part of Lewis and Clark National Forest and Gallatin National Forest (1945)
- Beartooth National Forest, now part of Custer National Forest (1932)
- Big Belt National Forest, now part of Helena National Forest and Gallatin National Forest (1908)
- Big Hole National Forest, now part of Beaverhead, Deerlodge and Bitterroot National Forests (1908)
- Blackfeet National Forest, now part of Flathead National Forest and Kootenai National Forest (1935)
- Cabinet National Forest, now part of Kaniksu, Kootenai and Lolo National Forests (1954)
- Crazy Mountain National Forest, now part of Lewis and Clark National Forest (1908)
- Ekalaka National Forest, now part of Custer National Forest (1908)
- Elkhorn National Forest, now part of Helena National Forest (1908)
- Flathead Forest Reserve, now part of Flathead National Forest and Lewis and Clark National Forest (1903)
- Hell Gate National Forest, now part of Beaverhead, Deerlodge, Missoula and Bitterroot National Forests (1908)
- Highwood Mountains National Forest, now part of Lewis and Clark National Forest (1908)
- Jefferson National Forest (Montana), now part of Lewis and Clark National Forest (1932)
- Little Belt National Forest, now part of Lewis and Clark National Forest (1908)
- Little Rockies National Forest, now part of Lewis and Clark National Forest (1908)
- Long Pine National Forest, now part of Custer National Forest (1908)
- Madison National Forest, now part of Beaverhead, Gallatin and Deerlodge National Forests (1931)
- Missoula National Forest, now part of Lolo National Forest and Deerlodge National Forest (1931)
- Otter National Forest, now part of Custer National Forest (1908)
- Pryor Mountains National Forest, now part of Custer National Forest (1908)
- Sioux National Forest, now part of Custer National Forest (1920)
- Snowy Mountains National Forest, now part of Lewis and Clark National Forest (1908)
