= Big Hole (disambiguation) =

Big Hole may refer to:

- The Big Hole, a former open-pit mine in Kimberley, South Africa
- Big Hole National Battlefield, a memorial in Montana, United States
- Big Hole (Oregon), a large explosion crater in Lake County, Oregon
- Battle of the Big Hole, a battle during the Nez Perce War of 1877
- Big Hole Pass, a high mountain pass in Montana
- Big Hole National Forest, a former National Forest in Montana and Idaho
- Big Hole River
