= DNRC =

DNRC may refer to:

- Montana Department of Natural Resources and Conservation, United States, oversees sustainable use of Montana's resources
- Defence and National Rehabilitation Centre, Nottinghamshire, England, rehabilitates military personnel and civilians
