= Clearwater State Forest =

Protected area in Montana, United States

- Location: Missoula County, Montana
- Nearest city: Missoula, MT
- Area: 18,076 acres (73.15 km^{2})
- Established: 1925
- Governing body: Montana Department of Natural Resources and Conservation

Clearwater State Forest is a state forest located in Montana. The forest has an area of approximately 18,076 acres and is one of the seven state forests in Montana.

The forest was designated as a state forest in 1925 through a law passed by the Montana Legislature.

== History ==
The forest was first known as "Clearwater Timber Reserve". In 1906, it was founded as part of Lolo National Forest. During this time through the 1950s, this forest was mostly used for logging which was a major part of the local economy. In 1957, it was founded as Clearwater State Forrest to be managed and ran by Montana Department of Natural Resources and Conservation (DNRC).

== See also ==
- List of forests in Montana
