= Bridger National Forest =

National forest in Wyoming, US

Coordinates: 42°48′N 110°42′W

The Bridger National Forest was first established by the U.S. Forest Service on July 1, 1911 in Wyoming with 577,580 acres (2,337.4 km^{2}) from part of Bonneville National Forest. On May 14, 1923 Bridger was transferred Wyoming National Forest, and the name was discontinued. On March 10, 1943 Wyoming was renamed Bridger. In 1973 Bridger National Forest was administratively combined with Teton National Forest, creating Bridger-Teton National Forest. In descending order of land area, Bridger National Forest lands are located in Sublette, Lincoln, Fremont, and Teton counties. There are local ranger district offices in Afton, Big Piney, Kemmerer, and Pinedale. Its administrative headquarters reside in Jackson, Wyoming as part of the combined Bridger-Teton National Forest. Its current area of 1,736,075 acres (7,025.65 km^{2}) represents 51.02% of the combined Bridger-Teton's area of 3,402,644 acres (13,770.01 km^{2}). The forest includes all of the National Wilderness Preservation System's officially designated Bridger Wilderness.
