= Thompson River State Forest =

Protected area in Montana, United States

- Location within Montana Location within the United States
- Location: Sanders County, Montana
- Nearest city: Plains, Montana
- Coordinates: 47.69673°N 114.97342°W
- Area: 11,704 acres (47.36 km^{2})
- Established: 1925
- Governing body: Montana Department of Natural Resources and Conservation,

Thompson River State Forest is a state forest located in Montana. The forest has an area of approximately 11,704 acres and is one of the seven state forests in Montana.

The forest was designated as a state forest in 1925 through a law passed by the Montana Legislature.

== See also ==
- List of forests in Montana
