= Washakie National Forest =

Former national forest in Wyoming

Coordinates: 44.417°N 109.959°W

Washakie National Forest was established by the U.S. Forest Service in Wyoming on July 1, 1911 with 393,950 acres (1,594.3 km^{2}) from part of Bonneville National Forest. On July 1, 1916 the remainder of Bonneville was added. On July 1, 1945 the entire forest was transferred to Shoshone National Forest and the name was discontinued.
