= Coram Experimental Forest =

Research station in Montana, United States

Coordinates: 48°25′00″N 113°57′40″W

The Coram Experimental Forest was established in 1933 within the Flathead National Forest in the US state of Montana, about 45 kilometers east of Kalispell, near Coram, and just outside the borders of Glacier National Park.

The forest is an outdoor laboratory established for research into the management of one species, the western larch (Larix occidentalis). In 1938, about 800 acres (3.2 km^{2}) of the original 7,460-acre (30.2 km^{2}) facility were designated as the Coram Research Natural Area. A few of its western larches are over 500 years old. The forest is networked with roads but is not inhabited.

Many species of plant are researched in the forest, including the aforementioned western larch, as well as Thuja plicata and Pinus albicaulis. Fauna in the region include large predators, such as the grizzly bear and lynx. The forest has a typical mean temperature between 2 and 7 degrees Celsius.

Coram Experimental Forest was a United Nations Biosphere Reserve but was withdrawn from the program as of June 14, 2017.
