= Lump Gulch =

Former mining district in Montana, United States

Coordinates: 46°26′43.08″N 112°6′56.88″W

Lump Gulch is an area of silver and gold mines in Jefferson County in the state of Montana in the United States. It's also known as the Lump Gulch Placer and the Lump Gulch Mining District and a former mining camp called Lump Gulch City.

It was named Lump Gulch in 1864 after a lump of gold found by prospectors William Sprague and Fred Jones. Gold miners flooded the area to look for lodes, but none were found. However, the area would be noted for other mineral deposits.

Two mining companies operated in the area in the 20th century: Lump Gulch Mining Co., which was incorporated in 1906, and Lump Gulch Silver Mines Co., which was incorporated in 1919. According to the companies, the veins in the Lump Gulch area include silver, galena, and zinc sulphide. The most lucrative vein was in the Liverpool Mine, which produced over a million dollars' worth of silver ore during its height of production.

A map of the Lump Gulch Mining District is located in the Montana Historical Society collection.

In 2020, the Lump Gulch Fire started in the Lump Gulch area. The result of a downed power line during a wind storm, the fire burned approximately 1,073 acres (434 ha).
