= Big Belt National Forest =

Forest in Montana

Coordinates: 46.543°N 112.213°W

Big Belt National Forest was established as the Big Belt Forest Reserve by the United States Forest Service in Montana on October 3, 1905 with 630,260 acres (2,550.6 km^{2}). It became a National Forest on March 4, 1907. On July 1, 1908 part of Big Belt was combined with Gallatin National Forest and the remainder with Helena National Forest. The name was discontinued.

== See also ==
- List of forests in Montana
