= Coal Creek State Forest =

Protected area in Montana, United States

- Coal Creek Forest
- Location: Flathead County, Montana
- Nearest city: Columbia Falls, Montana
- Area: 14,994 acres (60.68 km^{2})
- Established: 1925
- Governing body: Montana Department of Natural Resources and Conservation

Coal Creek State Forest is a state forest located in Montana. The forest has an area of approximately 20,000 acres and is one of the seven state forests in Montana.

The forest was designated as a state forest in 1925 through a law passed by the Montana Legislature.

== See also ==
- List of forests in Montana
