= Blackfeet National Forest =

Former national forest in Montana

Blackfeet National Forest was established by the U.S. Forest Service in Montana on July 1, 1908 with 1,956,340 acres (7,917.0 km^{2}). On June 22, 1935 Blackfeet was divided between Flathead National Forest and Kootenai National Forest, and the name was discontinued.

== See also ==
- List of forests in Montana
