= Pryor Mountains National Forest =

Former national forest in Montana

Coordinates: 45.411°N 108.695°W

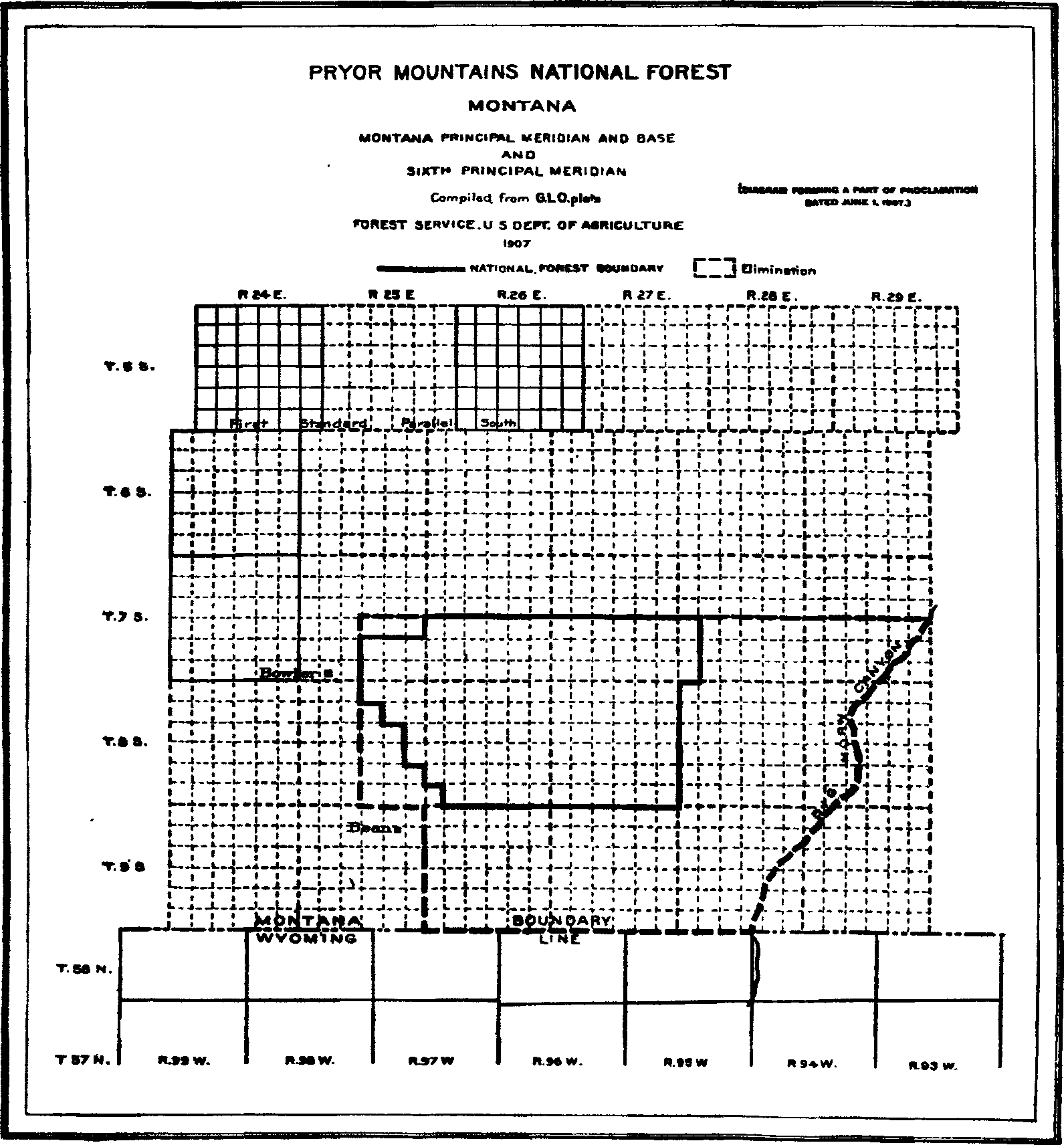

Pryor Mountains National Forest was established as the Pryor Mountains Forest Reserve by the U.S. Forest Service in Montana on November 6, 1906 by the U.S. Forest Service with 78,732 acres (318.62 km^{2}). It became a National Forest on March 4, 1907. On July 1, 1908 it was combined with part of Yellowstone National Forest to establish Beartooth National Forest. The name was discontinued.

The forest today comprises the Pryor Mountains unit of the Beartooth Ranger District of Custer National Forest, in Carbon County, Montana.

== See also ==
- Pryor Mountains
- List of forests in Montana
