= Hell Gate National Forest =

Protected area in Montana, United States

Hell Gate National Forest was established as the Hell Gate Forest Reserve by the U.S. Forest Service in Montana on October 3, 1905 with 1,581,120 acres (6,398.6 km^{2}). It became a National Forest on March 4, 1907. On July 1, 1908 the entire forest was divided between Beaverhead, Deerlodge, Missoula and Bitterroot National Forests and the name was discontinued.

== See also ==
- List of forests in Montana
