= Bonneville National Forest =

American forest

Bonneville National Forest was established by the U.S. Forest Service in Wyoming on July 1, 1908 with 1,627,840 acres (6,587.6 km^{2}) from part of Yellowstone National Forest. On July 1, 1917 the entire forest was transferred to Washakie National Forest and the name was discontinued.
