= W.A. Franke College of Forestry & Conservation =

College within the University of Montana

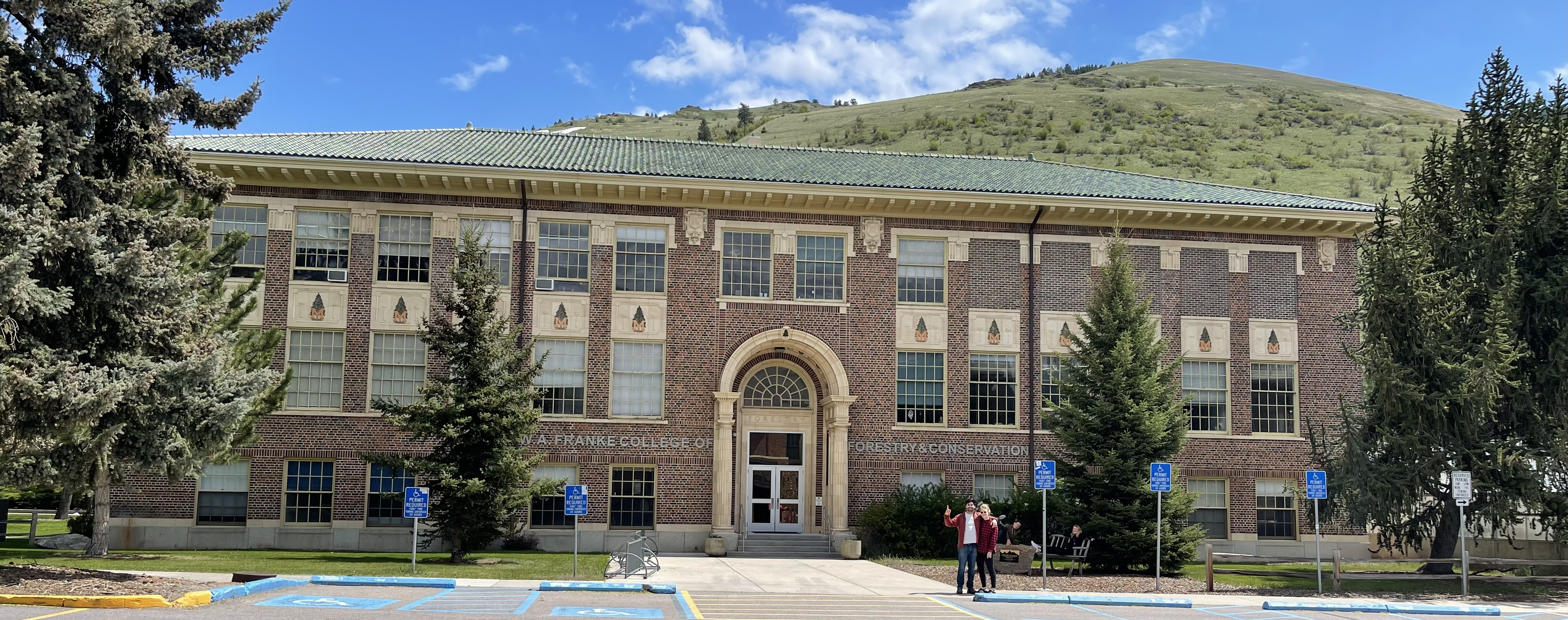
- Type: Public
- Established: 1913
- Dean: Alan Townsend
- Location: Missoula, Montana, USA; 46°51′29″N 113°59′03″W
- Campus: University of Montana
- Website: " www.cfc.umt.edu/"

The W.A. Franke College of Forestry & Conservation, formerly the University of Montana College of Forestry and Conservation, is a college within the University of Montana. It was created by an act of the Thirteenth Montanan Legislative Assembly in 1913 to meet the great and growing demand on the part of lumber companies, large timber holding corporations, and the national and state governments.

== Laboratories and Stations ==
The W.A. Franke College of Forestry and Conservation has access to well-equipped laboratories, extensive computer technology, and field stations:

1. The 28,000-acre (110 km^{2}) Lubrecht Experimental Forest
2. The 3,500-acre (14 km^{2}) Bandy Ranch

Faculty and scientists in its centers and institutes conduct research across a broad range of natural resource and environmental science disciplines, from wildland fire to wildlife management:

1. Avian Science Center
2. Bolle Center for People and Forests
3. Institute for Tourism & Recreation Research
4. International Seminar on Protected Area Management
5. Montana Climate Office
6. Rocky Mountains Cooperative Ecosystem Studies Unit
7. U.S. Fish Fish & Wildlife Service Grizzly Bear Recovery Program
8. Wilderness Institute

== Program ==
The W.A. Franke College of Forestry and Conservation houses five undergraduate majors, six minors, and four undergraduate certificates. Students can choose from six master's degree programs, three PhD programs, and four graduate certificate programs. The Wildlife Biology program was ranked number one in the country by Academic Analytics in 2016.

== Building ==
The Forestry Building is one of the oldest buildings on campus. It was built in the Renaissance Revival style specified by Carsley-Gilbert's master plan in 1922.
