= Otter National Forest =

Former national forest in Montana

Coordinates: 45.5°N 106.0°W

Otter National Forest was established by the U.S. Forest Service in Montana on March 2, 1907, with 123,779 acres (500.92 km^{2}). On July 1, 1908, the name was changed to Custer National Forest.

The forest comprises the Ashland Ranger District of Custer National Forest, in Powder River County and Rosebud County.

== See also ==
- List of forests in Montana
