= Missoula National Forest =

Former national forest in Montana, United States

Missoula National Forest was established as the Missoula Forest Reserve by the U.S. Forest Service in Montana on November 6, 1906, with a total area of 194,430 acres (786.8 km^{2}). It became a National Forest on March 4, 1907. On July 1, 1908, Missoula received a portion of Hell Gate National Forest. On December 16, 1931, the entire forest was divided between Lolo National Forest and Deerlodge National Forest and the name was discontinued.

== See also ==
- List of forests in Montana
