= Stillwater State Forest =

Protected area in Montana, United States

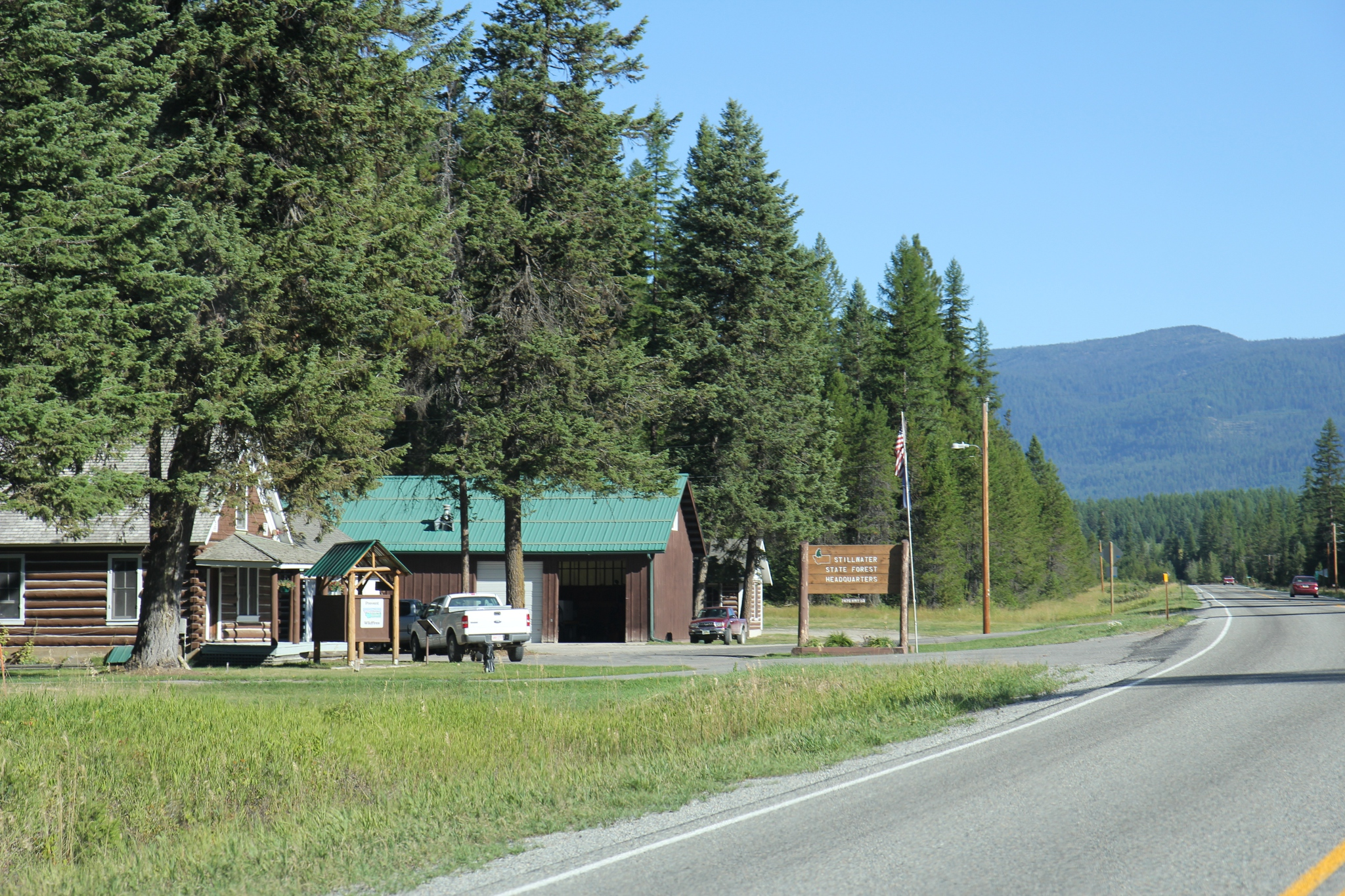
The headquarters of Stillwater State Forest

Stillwater State Forest is a state forest located in Montana. The forest has an area of approximately 90,000 acres and is one of the seven state forests in Montana.

The forest was designated as a state forest in 1925 through a law passed by the Montana Legislature.

== See also ==
- List of forests in Montana
