= Beartooth National Forest =

National Forest in Montana, US (1908–1932)

Coordinates: 45.166°N 109.811°W

Beartooth National Forest was established in Montana on July 1, 1908 by the U.S. Forest Service with 685,293 acres (2,773.28 km^{2}) from part of Yellowstone National Forest and all of Pryor Mountains National Forest. On February 17, 1932 the forest was divided between Absaroka National Forest and Custer National Forest and the name preserved as the Beartooth Ranger District of Custer National Forest.

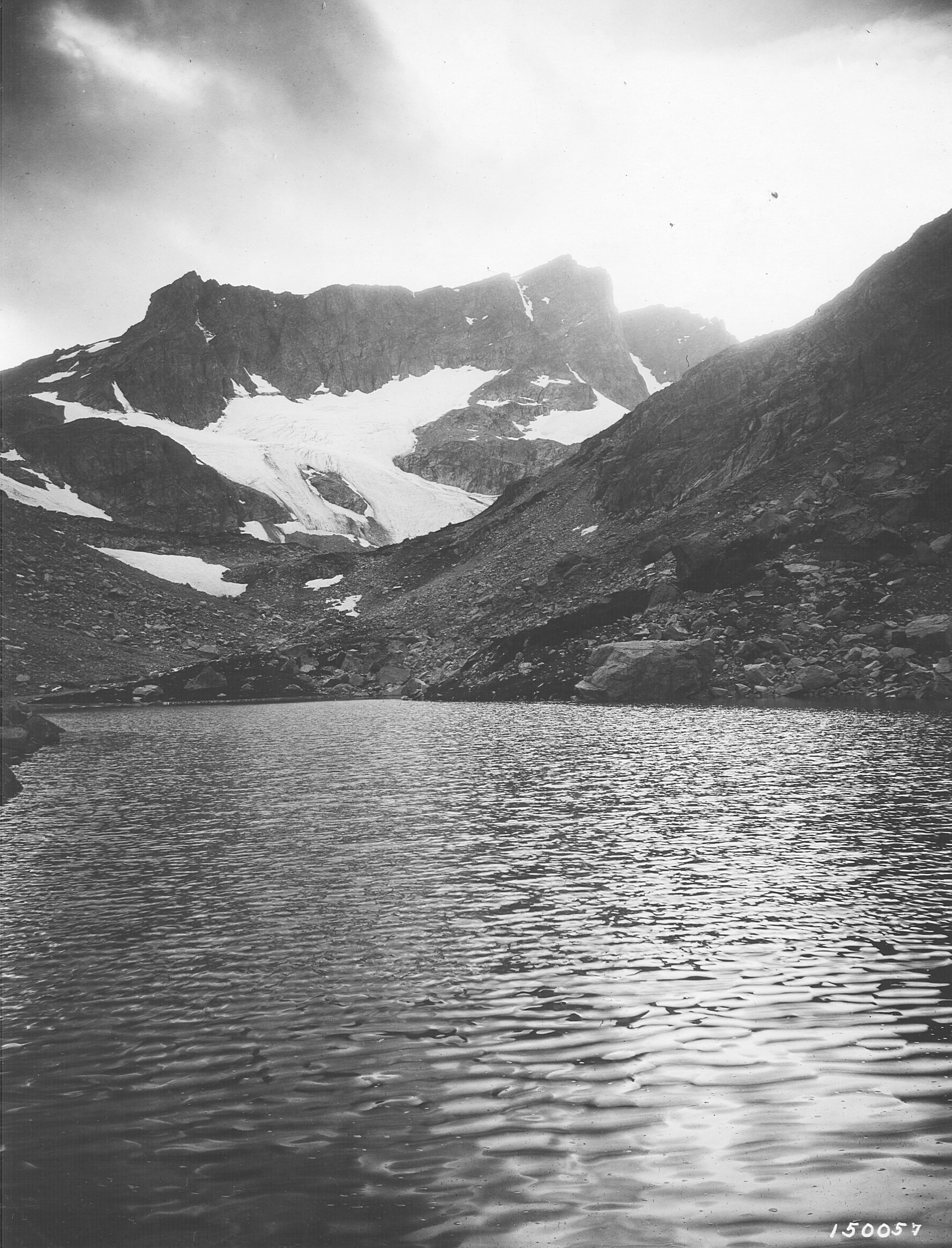
Lake and Glaciers, Date unknown. Source: Forest Service Northern Region

== See also ==
- List of forests in Montana
