= Madison National Forest =

Former national forest in Montana, United States

Madison National Forest was established as the Madison Forest Reserve by the United States General Land Office in Montana on August 16, 1902, with 736,000 acres (2,980 km^{2}). After the transfer of federal forests to the U.S. Forest Service in 1905, it became a National Forest on March 4, 1907. On December 16, 1931, Madison was divided between Beaverhead, Gallatin and Deerlodge National Forests and the name was discontinued.

== See also ==
- List of forests in Montana
