= Snowy Mountains National Forest =

Former National Forest of the United States

Snowy Mountains National Forest was established as the Snowy Mountains Forest Reserve by the U.S. Forest Service in Montana on November 5, 1906 with 126,080 acres (510.2 km^{2}). It became a National Forest on March 4, 1907. On July 1, 1908 the entire forest was combined with Little Belt, Snowy Mountains and Little Rockies National Forests to establish Jefferson National Forest and the name was discontinued.

The forest is part of the Jefferson Division of Lewis and Clark National Forest. The Big Snowy Mountains and part of the Little Snowy Mountains are included in the unit, primarily in Fergus and Golden Valley Counties. A Wilderness Study Area has been designated in the Big Snowies.

== See also ==
- List of forests in Montana
