= Absaroka National Forest =

Former national forest in Montana, United States

Coordinates: 43°57′40″N 109°20′21″W

Absaroka National Forest is a U.S. national forest in the U.S. state of Montana, established by the United States General Land Office on September 4, 1902, as the Absaroka Forest Reserve with a total area of 1,311,600 acres (5,308 km^{2}).

On January 29, 1903, it was combined with the Yellowstone Forest Reserve, but it was reinstated as a national forest under the U.S. Forest Service on July 1, 1908, with 980,400 acres (3,968 km^{2}), including portions of Yellowstone National Forest and all of Crazy Mountain National Forest. On February 17, 1932, part of Beartooth National Forest was added. On July 1, 1945, the entire forest was divided between Lewis and Clark and Gallatin National Forests.

== See also ==
- List of forests in Montana
