= Highwood Mountains National Forest =

Former national forest in Montana

Coordinates: 47°26′00″N 110°34′00″W

Highwood Mountains National Forest was established as the Highwood Mountains Forest Reserve by the U.S. Forest Service in Montana on April 12, 1906 with 45,080 acres (182.4 km^{2}). It became a National Forest on March 4, 1907. On July 1, 1908 the entire forest was combined with Little Belt, Snowy Mountains and Little Rockies National Forests to establish Jefferson National Forest (Montana) and the name was discontinued. The lands are now included in Lewis and Clark National Forest.

The forest is part of the Jefferson Division of Lewis and Clark National Forest. The Highwood Mountains are included in the unit, primarily in Chouteau and Judith Basin Counties. A Wilderness Study Area has been designated in the Highwoods.

== See also ==
- List of forests in Montana
