= Little Rockies National Forest =

Former national forest in Montana

Coordinates: 47°58′00″N 108°33′00″W

Little Rockies National Forest was established by the U.S. Forest Service in Montana on March 2, 1907 with 31,000 acres (130 km^{2}). On July 1, 1908 the entire forest was combined with Little Belt, Snowy Mountains and Highwood Mountains National Forests to establish Jefferson National Forest (Montana) and the name was discontinued. The entire Jefferson National Forest was later consolidated with the Lewis and Clark National Forest. The former Forest Service lands in the Little Rockies are now administered by the Bureau of Land Management.

== See also ==
- List of forests in Montana
