= Teton National Forest =

National forest in Wyoming, US

- IUCN category VI (protected area with sustainable use of natural resources)
- Location within Wyoming
- Location: Wyoming, United States
- Nearest city: Jackson
- Coordinates: 43°35′N 110°20′W
- Area: 19,911,200 acres (80,578 km^{2}) (at its reinstatement in 1908); Originally established with 892,440 acres (3,611.6 km2)
- Established: February 22, 1897 (as Teton Forest Reserve)
- Governing body: U.S. Forest Service

Teton National Forest, in western Wyoming, was a United States national forest that would form a constituent part of the present-day Bridger-Teton National Forest. It was first established by the United States General Land Office on February 22, 1897 as the Teton Forest Reserve with 892,440 acres (3,611.6 km^{2}). A commission was established in 1896 to plan for a system of national forest reserves, recommending an expansion of the territory protected by the Yellowstone Timberland Reserve. President Grover Cleveland's 1897 proclamation established a protected area encompassing the northern end of Jackson Hole, extending from the south boundary of the Yellowstone Forest Reserve south to the area of the Gros Ventre River, and from the Idaho border in the west to the area of the Continental Divide in the east. Much of this area would eventually be incorporated into Grand Teton National Park. In 1902 the southern portion of the Yellowstone reserve was added, while the Teton Reserve was greatly expanded to the south and east while excluding the southern portion of Jackson Hole around the town of Jackson.

On January 29, 1903 it was combined with the Yellowstone Forest Reserve, but it was reinstated as a separate unit on July 1, 1908 with 19,911,200 acres (80,578 km^{2}). In 1973 Teton National Forest was administratively combined with Bridger National Forest, creating Bridger-Teton National Forest. In descending order of land area, Teton National Forest is located in parts of Teton, Sublette, Park, Fremont, and Lincoln counties. It is now administrated as part of the Bridger-Teton National Forest from its headquarters in Jackson, but there are local ranger district offices in Jackson and Moran. The forest contains both the Gros Ventre Wilderness and the Teton Wilderness, both officially designated by the National Wilderness Preservation System.
