= Swan River State Forest =

Protected area in Montana, United States

- Location within Montana Location within the United States
- Location: Lewis and Clark County, Montana
- Nearest city: Helena, Montana
- Coordinates: 47.7530735°N 113.805781°W
- Area: 39,828 acres (161.18 km^{2})
- Established: 1925
- Governing body: Montana Department of Natural Resources and Conservation

Swan River State Forest is a state forest located in Montana. The forest has an area of approximately 39,000 acres and is one of the seven state forests in Montana.

The forest was designated as a state forest in 1925 through a law passed by the Montana Legislature.

== See also ==
- List of forests in Montana
