= Big Hole National Forest =

Former national forest in Montana and Idaho

Big Hole National Forest was established as the Big Hole Forest Reserve by the U.S. Forest Service in Montana and Idaho on November 5, 1906 with 1,917,100 acres (7,758 km^{2}). It became a National Forest on March 4, 1907. On July 1, 1908 Big Hole was divided between Beaverhead, Deerlodge and Bitterroot National Forests and the name was discontinued.

== See also ==
- List of forests in Montana
