= Helena-Lewis and Clark National Forest =

Forest in Montana, United States

- Location within the United States
- Location: Montana, U.S.
- Nearest city: Great Falls, Montana
- Coordinates: 47°11′N 111°27′W
- Area: 2,800,000 acres (11,000 km^{2})
- Established: February 22, 1897; 129 years ago
- Governing body: U.S. Forest Service
- Website: Helena-Lewis and Clark National Forest

Helena-Lewis and Clark National Forest is located in west-central Montana, United States. Spanning 2.8-million acres. The region was inhabited by various cultures of Native Americans for a period of at least 8,000–10,000 years. When the Lewis and Clark Expedition came to this area, different areas of the large forest territory were used by members of the Blackfeet, Sioux, Cheyenne, Flathead and Crow nations for hunting and as an area for their seasonal winter camps. The forests provided shelter from the winter.

The forest lands were defined and established by the federal government in 1897, following its Treaty of 1896 with the Blackfeet forced to cede lands and move to a reservation adjacent to the national forest. The forest is one of the oldest forest preserves in the U.S. The forest is named in honor of the members of the Lewis and Clark Expedition, which passed through the forest between 1804 and 1806 while exploring the Louisiana Purchase for President Thomas Jefferson.

The forest is managed as two separate zones. The eastern sections, under the Jefferson Division, is a mixture of grass and shrublands dotted with island pockets of forested areas. Cattle leases to local ranchers as well as timber harvesting are the norm. The western Rocky Mountain Division, which straddles the Continental divide, is managed chiefly for environmental preservation, as much of the land has been designated as wilderness. Forest headquarters are located in Great Falls, Montana. Local ranger district offices have been established in Choteau, Harlowton, Neihart, Stanford, and White Sulphur Springs.

The forest is broken into several separate sections. The eastern regions are dominated by the Big Belt Mountains, and are the location of the Gates of the Mountains Wilderness, which remains much as it did when the Lewis and Clark Expedition passed through the region. The western sections have both the continental divide and the Scapegoat Wilderness area, which is part of the Bob Marshall Wilderness complex. The southern region includes the Elkhorn Mountains. The forest is composed of a mixture of grass and sagebrush covered lowlands with "island" pockets of lodgepole pine and more mountainous areas where Douglas fir, spruce and larch can be found. The Rocky Mountains in the region do not exceed 10,000 feet (3,000 m).

== Description ==
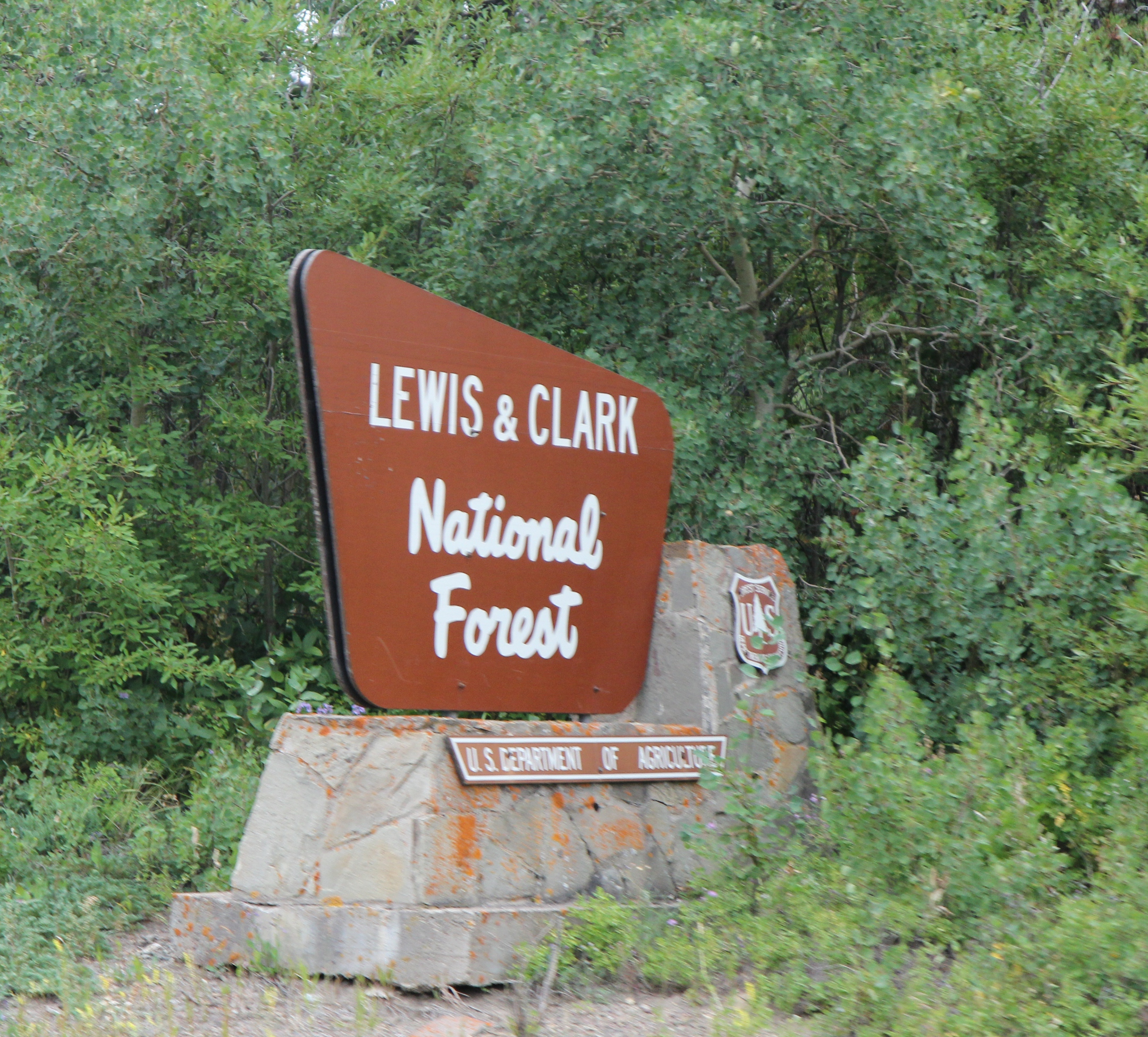
The sign for the western unit of Lewis and Clark National Forest on U.S. Route 2

Altitudes range from 4,500 feet (1,400 m) to the top of Rocky Mountain Peak at 9,362 feet (2,900 m). The forest is divided into seven separate sections and encompasses eight mountain ranges; the Judith, Big Snowy, Little Snowy, Crazy, Castle, Little Belt and Highwood Mountains. The westernmost section includes portions of the Scapegoat and the Bob Marshall wildernesses, and borders Glacier National Park to the north.

The western Rocky Mountain Division, informally called the Rocky Mountain Front, consists of a dense coniferous forest and has numerous species of spruce, fir, and pine. The Jefferson Division is dominated by ponderosa and lodgepole pine which prefer a drier climate. The grizzly bear and timber wolf are found in the western sections of the forest, and are especially dense in the designated wilderness areas. In addition, the western section contains much of the wildlife present at the time of the Lewis and Clark Expedition through the region. Mountain goats, bighorn sheep, elk, cougars, Canadian lynxes, wolverines and black bears are most common nearest the Continental Divide. In other sections of the forest, black bears, mule deer and white-tailed deer are the largest mammals found. Coyotes, raccoons, beavers, minks, muskrats, river otters and Columbian white-tailed deer inhabit the up-stream inlands. Throughout the forest, bald eagles, grouse, peregrine falcon and red tailed hawks are increasing in numbers. Lakes and streams are more numerous in the western section due to a higher altitude and more precipitation, and are home to the native westslope cutthroat trout. In the 1,600 miles (2,600 km) of rivers and streams in the forest, rainbow trout, brook trout and northern pike are relatively common. Excellent fly fishing opportunities are plentiful, especially in the Smith River.

The National Forest has 29 vehicle-accessible campgrounds. Two ski areas also operate within the forest. Almost 1,500 miles (2,400 km) of hiking trails provide access to remote locations in the seven different mountain ranges within the Forest. Solitude is most common in the Crazy Mountains and in the wilderness areas near the Continental divide. Summertime average high temperatures are in the 70s °F (20s °C), but the winter can be very cold, especially in the more exposed eastern sections. Snow can linger for up to 10 months of the year along the Continental divide.

The forest lies in parts of thirteen counties. In descending order of land area, they are Lewis and Clark, Meagher, Judith Basin, Teton, Cascade, Pondera, Fergus, Wheatland, Chouteau, Glacier, Golden Valley, Sweet Grass, and Park counties.

The grizzly bear has a sustained population in the northwestern section of the forest, especially in the Scapegoat Wilderness. Other predators such as wolves, bobcats, wolverines, mountain lions, and Canadian lynx are also present Black bears are numerous as are elk, moose, mule deer, and antelope. There are also small populations of bighorn sheep and mountain goats. Along streams and lakes, sightings of nesting bald eagles and other raptors are becoming more common due to protection of these species and their vitally important waterways.

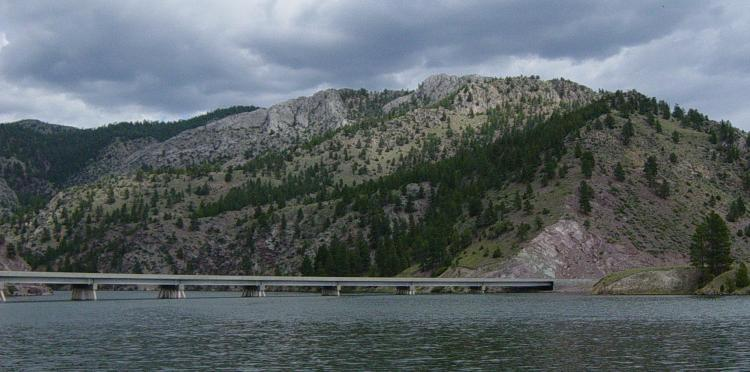
York-Trout Creek Bridge in Helena National Forest

Seven hundred miles (1,100 km)of hiking trails are located in the forest along with numerous trout streams and several lakes. There are over a dozen improved campgrounds. Snowmobile use is common in the winter months as is cross-country skiing. Interstate 15 runs north–south and U.S. Route 12 runs east–west through the area. The largest nearby city is Helena, Montana, which is the headquarters location for the forest.

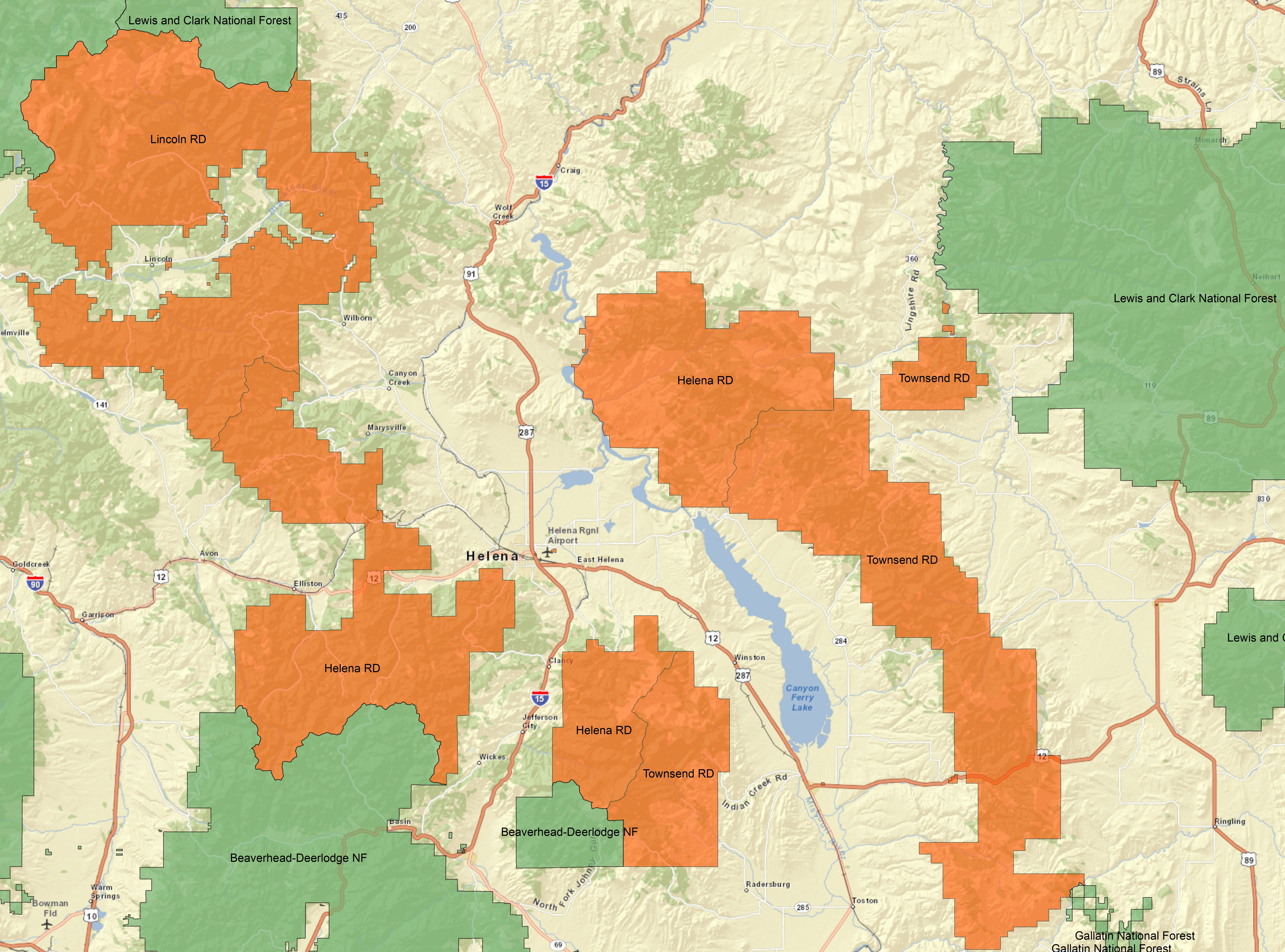
Map of Helena National Forest

In descending order of land area the forest is located in parts of Lewis and Clark, Broadwater, Powell, Jefferson, and Meagher counties. There are local ranger district offices in Helena, Lincoln, and Townsend.

=== Badger-Two Medicine ===
The Badger-Two Medicine area is a 200 square miles (520 km^{2}) portion of the Lewis and Clark Forest that is adjacent to the Blackfeet Reservation and Glacier National Park. It is sacred ground for the Blackfeet tribe. The Treaty of 1896 gives Blackfeet tribal members the right to hunt and fish the area in accordance with state law and to cut wood for domestic use. The Blackfeet have battled to protect Badger-Two Medicine by keeping the area roadless and by fighting proposed oil and gas drilling all along the Front, which is managed largely by the U.S. Forest Service (USFS) and the Bureau of Land Management (BLM). The Blackfeet have been assisted by conservation groups, preservationists (including the National Trust for Historic Preservation), outdoor sportsmen, ranchers and business owners.

Approximately 93,000 acres (38,000 ha) are currently recognized as eligible for the National Register of Historic Places (NRHP) as a traditional cultural district (TCD), but proponents continue to lobby to have the entire Badger-Two Medicine area recognized as an eligible TCD.

The U.S. Forest Service banned motorized travel on 186 miles (299 km) of trails in 2009. In January 2011, a federal district judge cleared the roadblock on the U.S. Forest Service's Badger-Two Medicine travel plan. The plan allows motorized access on 8 miles (13 km) of established trails and bans all snowmobile travel.

=== Flathead Forest Reserve ===
The reserve area is approximately 2,160 square miles including the reserve and a tract of country extending to the west as far as Tobacco Plains. The area which lies entirely north of the Great Northern Railway consists in general terms of two mountain ranges, one in the eastern the other in the western part of the reserve separated by a broad valley. The easternmost of the two ranges is the eastern range of the Rocky Mountain system in this latitude facing the plains. Its peaks have an altitude in the neighborhood of the railroad of from 7,000 to 9,000 feet rising northward so that at the northern boundary of the country they reach an altitude of 11,000 feet. All the gorges leading out of this range are of glacial origin and in the upper parts of these gorges glaciers still remain covering a large part of the region with snow and ice. It is an extremely rugged range abounding in points of great scenic interest. East of this range is the valley of Flathead River above the Flathead Lake which in the south has a width of about 15 miles narrowing northward toward the boundary. Succeeding the Flathead Valley on the west is a broken irregular mountain range not as high nor as rugged as the eastern range. Most of this region is drained southward by the Flathead River into Flathead Lake. Smaller portions are drained by the Kootenai, Saskatchewan and Missouri rivers.

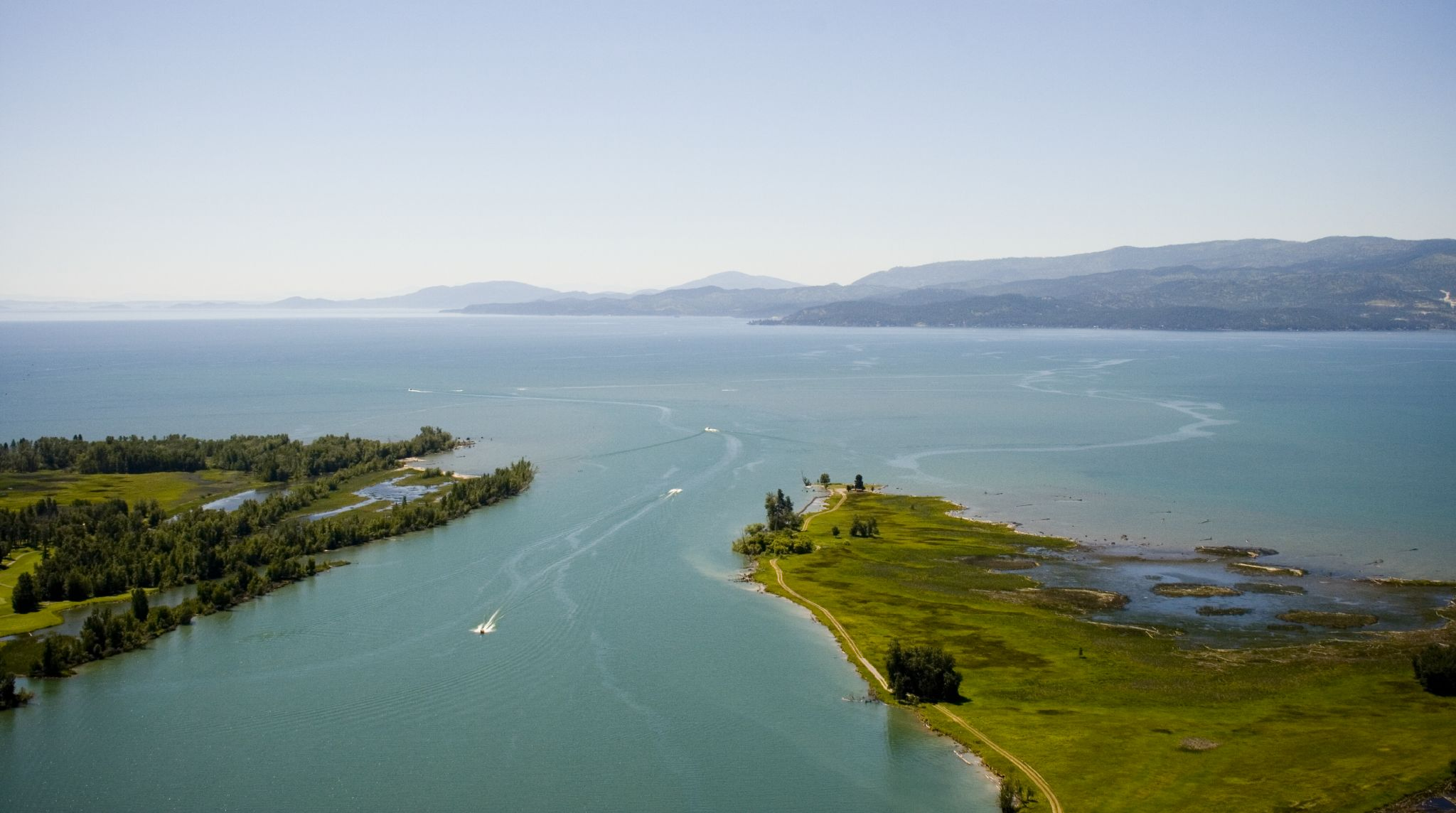
The Flathead River emptying into the north end of Flathead Lake at Bigfork, Montana, with the Flathead National Forest in the distance.

Taken as a whole the region is one of fairly abundant rainfall although as it has a wide range in altitude; the rainfall differs greatly in different parts. In the valleys irrigation is probably advisable if not necessary while upon the mountains the rainfall is ample for tree growth. Owing to the latitude and the elevation the temperature is low rendering it doubtful whether agriculture can ever be made profitable within it. The region is generally lightly timbered. This is not due to the climate, which is not unfavorable to tree growth, but to frequent and persistent fires. The merchantable timber in the reserve consists mainly of western larch, red fir, spruce and yellow pine. The entire stand of timber within the reserve estimating it upon the basis of the present practice in cutting is only 300 million feet. Measuring it, however, by Eastern standards it is found to contain 851 million feet and, in addition to that, 3,628,000 cords of wood suitable for firewood. This amount stands upon an area of 1,942 square miles leaving only 218 square miles reported as not timbered. It is plain from the above that this reserve cannot be regarded as an important source of timber at present but rather as a region for the cultivation of timber for future use. The probabilities of agriculture in this region are somewhat doubtful, owing to the severity of the climate. There were numerous gold mining claims being operated in the reserve in the late 1890s, although little mining has been conducted in modern times.

== History ==
In the late 19th century, after the end of the Indian Wars, the federal government worked to move Native American tribes on to Indian reservations, requiring them to cede land and extinguish their land claims to large areas of territory. The United States wanted to open the West to settlement and development by European Americans. The Blackfeet Indian Reservation, with members mostly of the Piegan Blackfeet branch, was established by Treaty of 1896 to the east of this forest area and Glacier National Park, bordering the province of Alberta, Canada, to the north.

The forest was the site of the 1949 Mann Gulch fire, which claimed the lives of 13 firefighters and which was the subject of both Norman Maclean's book Young Men and Fire and James Keelaghan's folk song "Cold Missouri Waters."

The Alice Creek Fire was started by a lightning strike in July 2017. The fire burned at least 29,252 acres (118 km^{2}), crossed the Continental Divide, and impacted aquatic life.

=== Former Forests ===
In 2014 the Helena National Forest and Lewis and Clark National forest consolidated their administrations to form the current Helena-Lewis and Clark National Forest.

On August 10, 1906, Crazy Mountain Forest Reserve was established with 234,760 acres (950.0 km^{2}), and became a National Forest on March 4, 1907. On July 1, 1908, it was combined with part of Yellowstone National Forest to re-establish Absaroka National Forest, and its name was discontinued.

==== Lewis And Clark National Forest ====
On February 22, 1897 under the management of the United States General Land Office, The Lewis and Clarke Forest Reserve and Flathead Forest Reserve were established, at the time of its creation the Flathead Forest Reserve had a size of 1,382,400 acres (5,594 km^{2}), On June 9, 1903 The Flathead Forest Reserve was combined with the Lewis and Clarke Forest Reserve and its name was discontinued. The forest territory was transferred to the U.S. Forest Service in 1906, and designated by the government as a National forest On March 2, 1907, the spelling was changed to Lewis and Clark, and land was added. On July 1, 1945, part of Absaroka National Forest was added.

==== Jefferson National Forest ====
On August 16, 1902 Little Belt Mountains Forest Reserve was established with a size of 501,000 acres (2,030 km^{2}). On October 3, 1905 it was renamed to Little Belt Forest Reserve and it grew to 583,600 acres (2,362 km^{2}), on March 4, 1907 it became a National Forest. On July 1, 1908 the Jefferson National Forest was established by the U.S. Forest Service with 1,255,320 acres (5,080.1 km^{2}) from the consolidation of Little Belt, Crazy Mountain, Snowy Mountains, Little Rockies and Highwood Mountains National Forests. On April 8, 1932 it was added to the Lewis and Clark National Forest

==== Helena National Forest ====
On April 12, 1906 Helena National Forest was established. On May 12, 1905 Elkhorn Forest Reserve was established and on March 4, 1907 it became a National Forest. On July 1, 1908 it was added to Helena National Forest with a size of 186,240 acres (753.7 km^{2}).

== Gallery ==
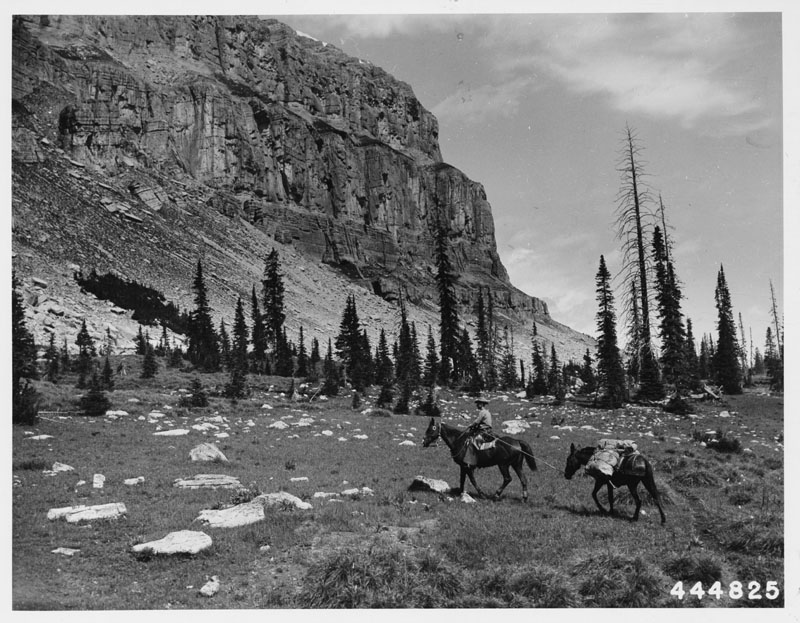
A rider near the Chinese Wall in 1946

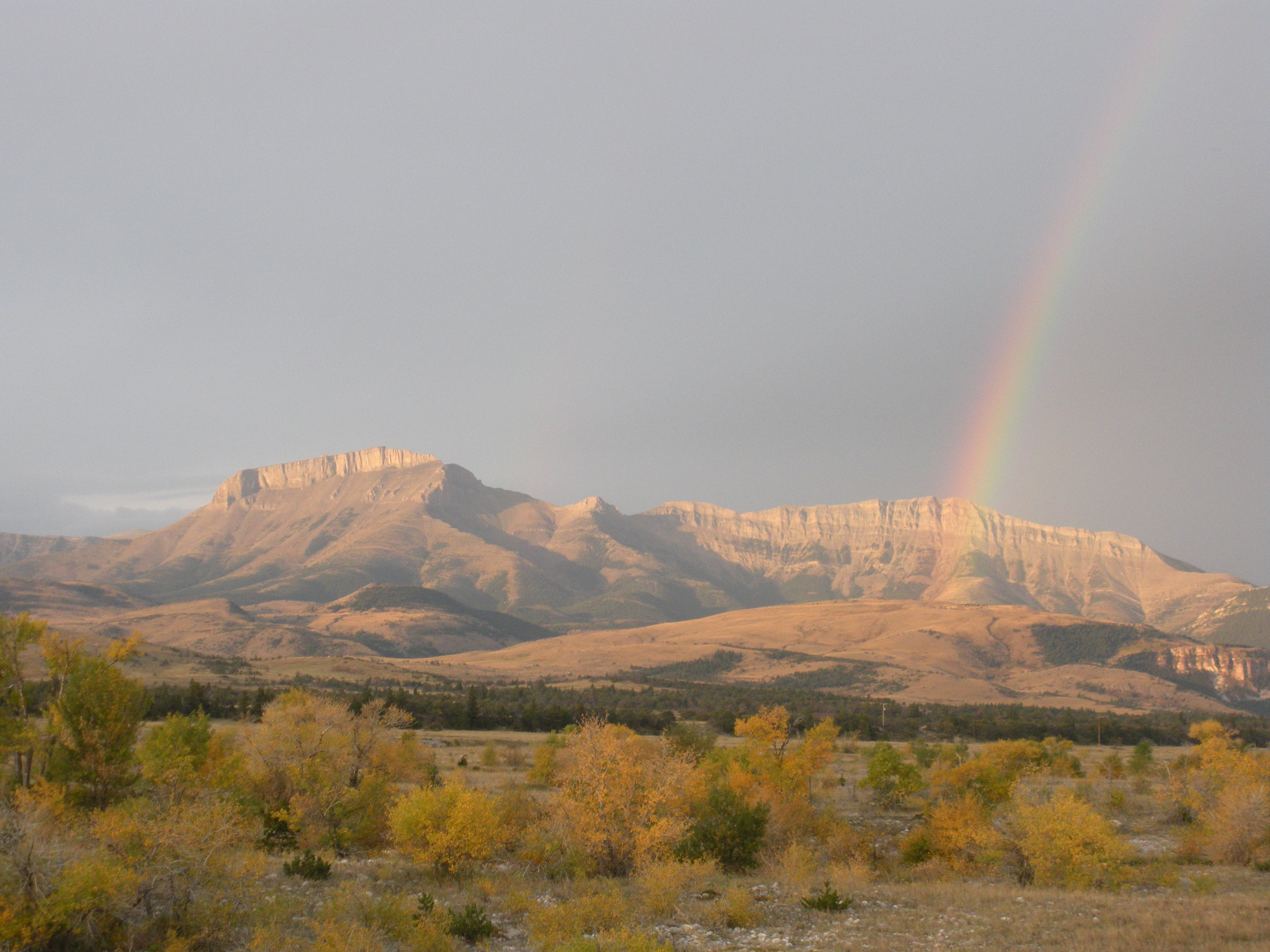
A rainbow on Ear Mountain near Choteau, Montana

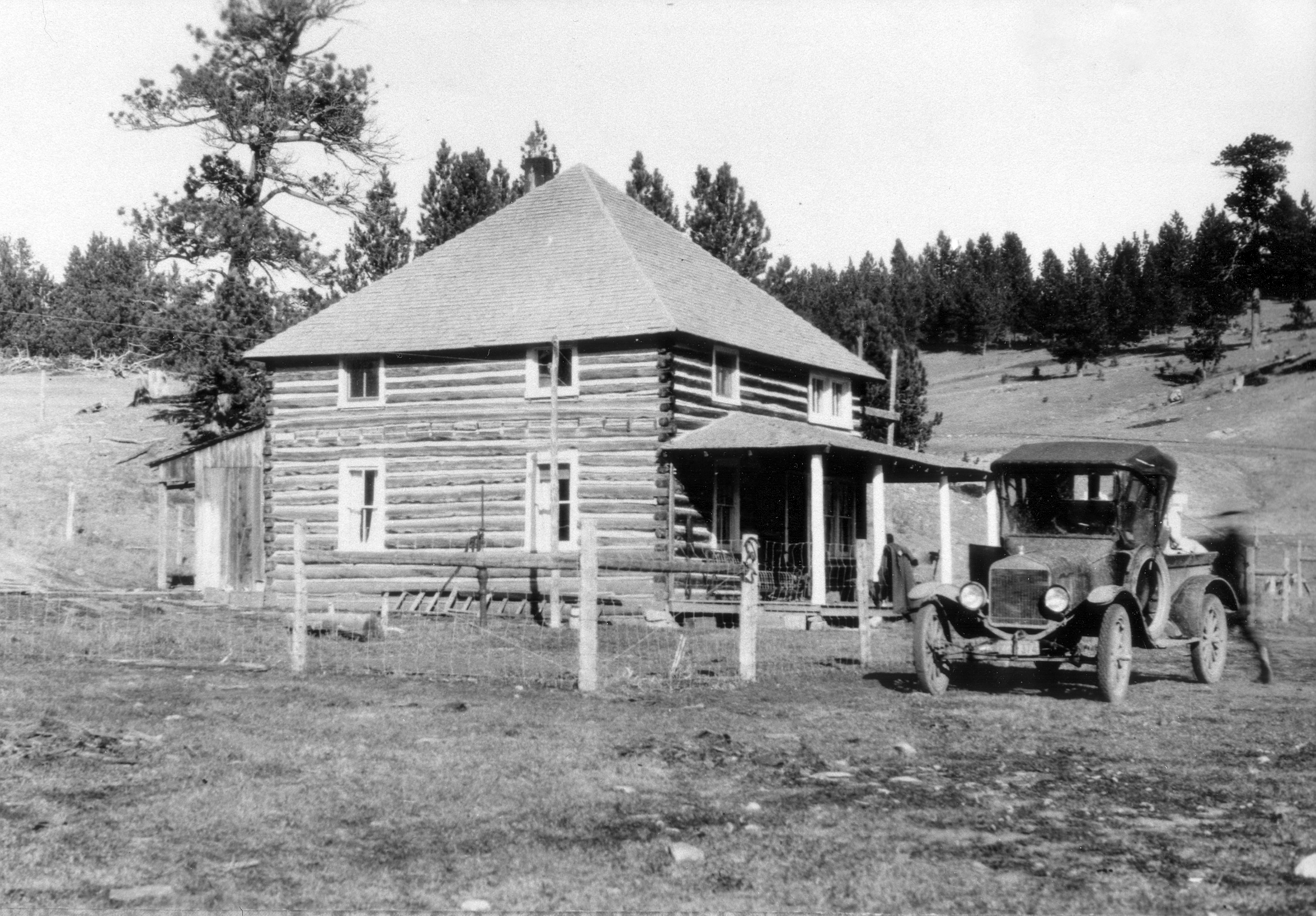
Judith Station, c. 1920

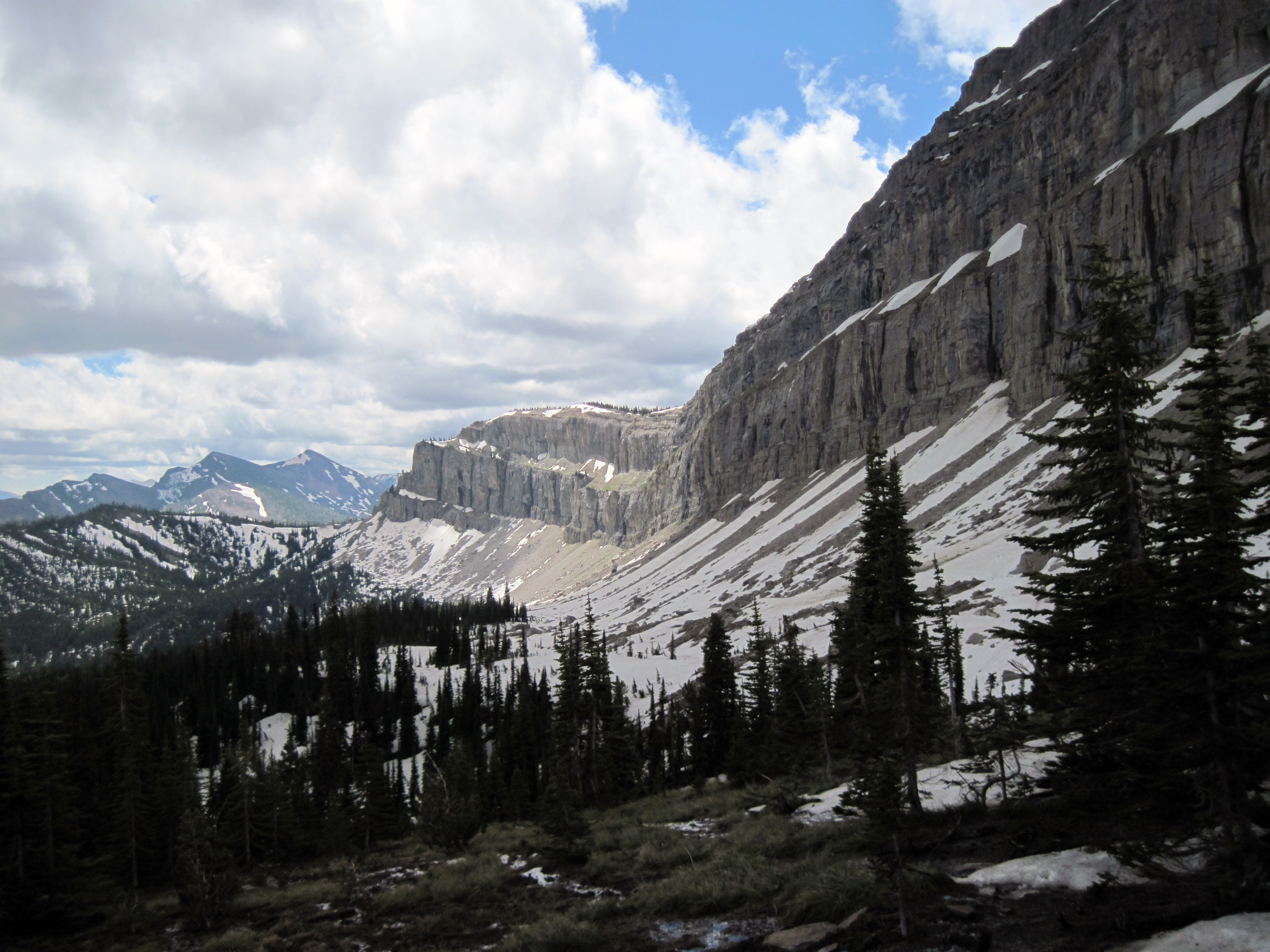
The Chinese Wall in the Rocky Mountain Ranger District

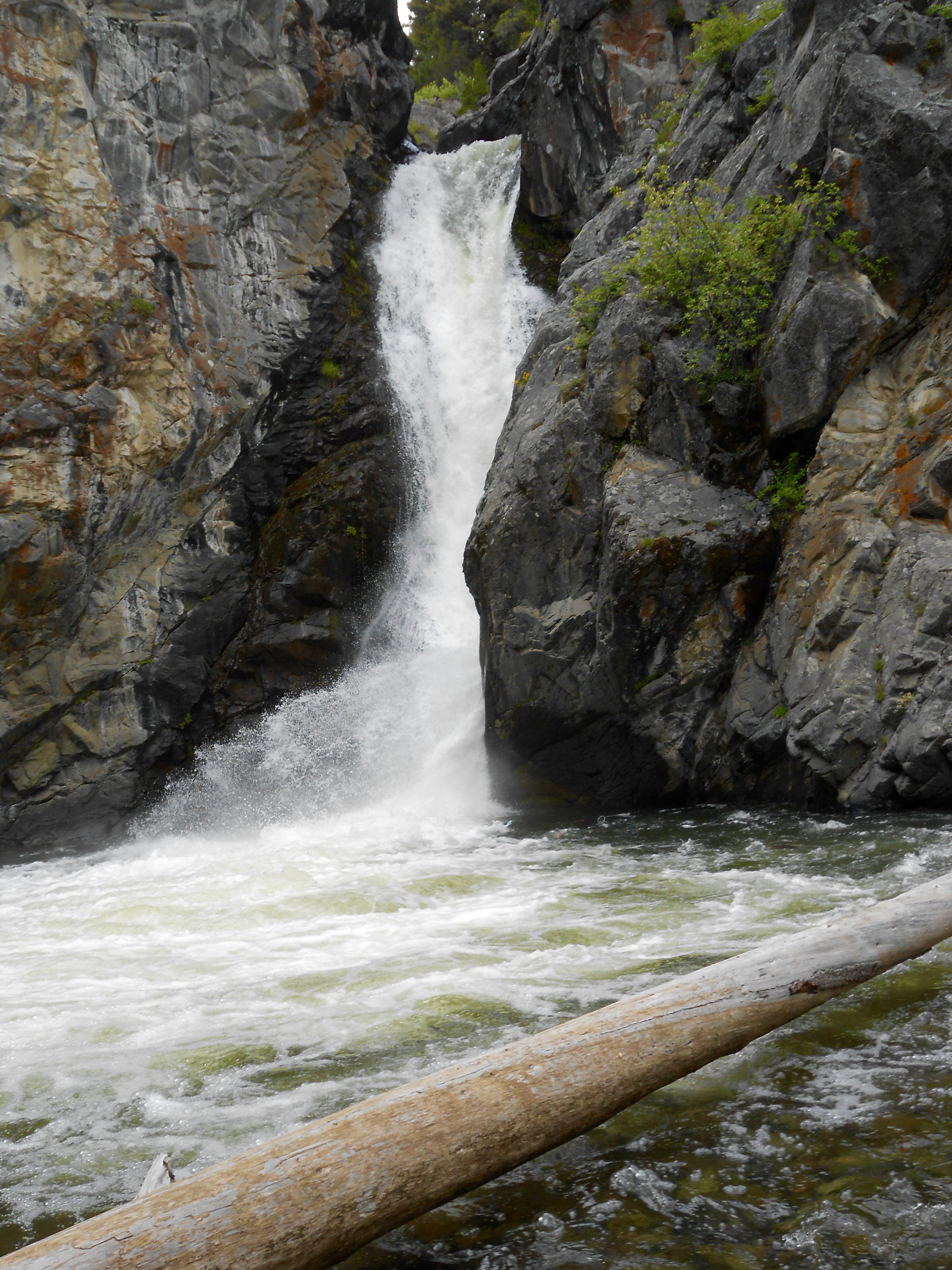
Crow Creek Falls is in the Elkhorn Mountains section of the Helena National Forest

== See also ==
- List of national forests of the United States
- List of forests in Montana
- Lewis and Clark Pass (Montana)
