= Yellowstone National Forest =

Protected area in the US

Coordinates: 44°36′N 110°30′W

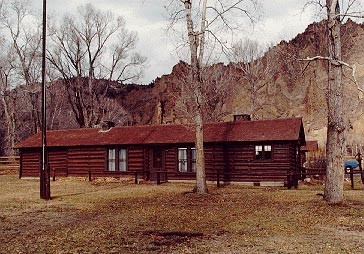
Wapiti Ranger Station

Yellowstone National Forest was first established by the United States General Land Office on March 30, 1891, as the Yellowstone Park Timber Land Reserve of 1,239,040 acres (5,014.2 km^{2}). On May 22, 1902, it became the Yellowstone Forest Reserve with lands of 6,580,920 acres (26,632.0 km^{2}).

The reserve was first suggested by General Philip Sheridan in 1882 after a visit to Yellowstone National Park. Sheridan recommended that the park be expanded 40 miles (64 km) to the east and 10 miles (16 km) to the south. Legislation was introduced by Senator George Graham Vest to accomplish this, but it was stalled by local opposition. The American Forestry Association took up the cause, advocating for legislation that would allow the United States president to set aside lands as "forest reservations" through an executive order. President Benjamin Harrison then proclaimed the reserve, largely following Sheridan's recommendation, on March 30, 1891. Some areas on the northeast portion of the proposed reservation were excluded to allow mining in the headwaters of the Clarks Fork River. The land was, in effect, the first national forest. For the time being, it was placed under the same military administration that applied to Yellowstone Park proper.

In 1902, lands were exchanged with the Teton Forest Reserve and the reserve was placed under civilian administration, with the first ranger station in the nation established at Wapiti on the Shoshone River. Artist and rancher Abraham Archibald Anderson was named as the first Special Superintendent of Forest Reserves.

On January 9, 1903, lands of the first Absaroka and Teton Forest Reserves were added, and on March 4, 1907, it became Yellowstone National Forest. In 1905, all federal forests were transferred to the U.S. Forest Service. On July 1, 1908, as part of a major reorganization, the forest was divided into Targhee, Teton, Wyoming, Bonneville, Absaroka, Shoshone, and Beartooth National Forests, and the name was discontinued.
