= Montana Department of Natural Resources and Conservation =

State agency of Montana

- Abbreviation: DNRC

Agency overview
- Formed: December 20, 1971
- Preceding agencies: Montana Council on Natural Resources and Development; Montana Oil and Gas Conservation Commission; Montana State Board of Forestry; Montana State Conservation Commission; Montana State Forester; Montana Water Resources Board
- Employees: 523.8 FTEs (2016)
- Annual budget: $240.6 million (2016)

Jurisdictional structure
- Operations jurisdiction: Montana, United States
- Area: 147,165 square miles (381,160 km^{2})
- Population: 1,042,520 (2016)
- Legal jurisdiction: State of Montana

Operational structure
- Headquarters: 1539 Eleventh Avenue, Helena, Montana
- Agency executives: Greg Gianforte, Governor of Montana; Amanda Kaster, Director

Facilities
- Patrol cars: Various cars, trucks, and off-road vehicles
- Boats: Various patrol and utility craft
- Planes: Light observation aircraft and helicopters

Website
- http://dnrc.mt.gov

The Montana Department of Natural Resources and Conservation (DNRC) is a government agency in the executive branch state of Montana in the United States with responsibility for ensuring sustainable development of the state's land, mineral, natural gas, oil, timber, water, and other resources.

== History ==
Almost two-thirds of Montana voters approved of Amendment 2, the Montana Executive Department Allocation Amendment, on November 3, 1970. This amendment required that there be no more than 20 state executive or administrative offices, agencies, boards, bureaus, or commissions. The Montana Legislature passed enabling legislation, the Executive Reorganization Act, in 1971, which gave Governor Forrest H. Anderson the legal authority to reorganize state government. On December 20, 1971, Governor Anderson used this authority to create, by executive order, the Department of Natural Resources and Conservation. The agency superseded the Montana Council on Natural Resources and Development, Montana Oil and Gas Conservation Commission, Montana State Board of Forestry, Montana State Conservation Commission, Montana State Forester, and Montana Water Resources Board.

== Organization and budget ==
=== Director and organization ===
Amanda Kaster was appointed the current Director of Montana DNRC by Governor Greg Gianforte.

DNRC has six divisions:

- The Director's Office—This division provides policy and managerial leadership for the department, and administrative support services to itself and other divisions, boards, and commissions.
- Oil and Gas Conservation Division—This division supports the Board of Oil and Gas. The board has the statutory authority to issue oil and gas drilling permits; classify oil and natural gas wells; administer completion, disaster, and reclamation bonds for oil and natural gas wells; oversees and regulates the plugging of abandoned oil and natural gas wells; and levies civil and criminal fines on drillers and well operators who violate state law and board regulations. Previously the administrative and technical arm of the Board of Oil and Gas Conservation, this division has only minimal attachment to the department.
- Conservation and Resource Development Division—This division provides technical and administrative assistance to conservation districts in the state. It also makes grants and loans to these districts.
- Water Resources Division—This division oversees dam safety; floodplain programs; the development, regulation, and operation of state-financed water development projects; water development and use planning; and the verification, examination, and filing of existing and future water rights.
- Forestry Division—This division oversees the development, management, operation, and regulation of state forests. It also provides forest and prairie fire prevention and fire suppression services.
- Trust Land Management Division—This division manages of trust lands owned by the State of Montana.

In addition to its divisions, nine boards and commissions are attached to the department for administrative purposes only: Board of Land Commissioners, Board of Oil and Gas Conservation, Board of Water Well Contractors, Drought Advisory Committee, Flathead Basin Commission, Montana Grass Conservation Commission, Rangeland Resources Committee, Reserved Water Rights Compact Commission, and the Resource Conservation Advisory Council.

=== Budget and personnel ===
The DNRC had a total budget of $240.6 million in 2016. Trust lands generated 48 percent of its budget. Revenue operations (fees, services, etc.) generated another 21 percent of all revenues, with general state revenues adding 12 percent and interest on debt another 10 percent.

The DNRC had 523.8 full-time equivalent employees in 2016.

== Bibliography ==
- Elison, Larry M.; Snyder, Fritz (2001). The Montana State Constitution: A Reference Guide. Westport, Conn.: Greenwood Press. ISBN 9780313273469.
- Governor's Conference on Montana Rangeland (September 1976). The Future of Montana's Rangeland? (PDF) (Report). Billings, Mont.: Cooperative Extension Service, Montana State University.
- Legislative Fiscal Division (November 2016). The Department of Natural Resources and Conservation: An Agency Profile (PDF) (Report). Helena, Mont.: Montana Legislature.
- Malone, Michael P.; Roeder, Richard B.; Lang, William L. (1991). Montana: A History of Two Centuries. Seattle: University of Washington Press. ISBN 9780295971209.
- Task Force on Natural Resources and Conservation (December 10, 1971). Reorganization Plan: Montana Department of Natural Resources and Conservation (Report). Helena, Mont.: Office of the Governor.
