= List of mountains in Flathead County, Montana (M-Z) =

There are at least 314 named mountains in Flathead County, Montana.

- Marmot Mountain, 47°41′24″N 113°28′57″W, el. 8,238 feet (2,511 m)
- Masonry Peak, 48°51′44″N 114°37′47″W, el. 7,103 feet (2,165 m)
- McGregor Peak, 48°02′49″N 114°48′19″W, el. 5,210 feet (1,590 m)
- McPartland Mountain, 48°41′26″N 113°51′49″W, el. 8,159 feet (2,487 m)
- Meadow Mountain, 47°49′10″N 113°22′14″W, el. 7,077 feet (2,157 m)
- Meadow Peak, 48°04′47″N 114°59′20″W, el. 6,699 feet (2,042 m)
- Medicine Grizzly Peak, 48°33′34″N 113°27′55″W, el. 8,153 feet (2,485 m)
- Mid Mountain, 47°49′41″N 113°17′54″W, el. 7,375 feet (2,248 m)
- Minaret Peak, 47°48′27″N 113°17′03″W, el. 7,139 feet (2,176 m)
- Moccasin Butte, 47°37′47″N 113°11′38″W, el. 7,188 feet (2,191 m)
- Moose Peak, 48°38′36″N 114°25′35″W, el. 7,523 feet (2,293 m)
- Moran Peak, 48°44′08″N 114°25′12″W, el. 7,411 feet (2,259 m)
- Mount Adams, 48°14′55″N 113°42′41″W, el. 7,625 feet (2,324 m)
- Mount Aeneas, 48°08′55″N 113°55′09″W, el. 7,477 feet (2,279 m)
- Mount Baptiste, 48°07′41″N 113°38′03″W, el. 8,379 feet (2,554 m)
- Mount Bradley, 48°10′08″N 113°27′33″W, el. 7,339 feet (2,237 m)
- Mount Brown, 48°38′18″N 113°49′04″W, el. 8,438 feet (2,572 m)
- Mount Cameahwait, 48°13′42″N 113°41′54″W, el. 7,779 feet (2,371 m)
- Mount Cannon, 48°41′33″N 113°46′27″W, el. 8,829 feet (2,691 m)
- Mount Carter, 48°53′32″N 114°04′39″W, el. 9,829 feet (2,996 m)
- Mount Custer, 48°58′49″N 114°03′29″W, el. 8,802 feet (2,683 m)
- Mount Despair, 48°23′56″N 113°25′54″W, el. 8,543 feet (2,604 m)
- Mount Doody, 48°25′48″N 113°34′33″W, el. 8,651 feet (2,637 m)
- Mount Furlong, 48°13′16″N 113°30′51″W, el. 7,260 feet (2,210 m)
- Mount Geduhn, 48°47′48″N 113°58′12″W, el. 8,350 feet (2,550 m)
- Mount Grant, 48°19′29″N 113°45′21″W, el. 8,589 feet (2,618 m)
- Mount Hefty, 48°59′51″N 114°34′25″W, el. 7,467 feet (2,276 m)
- Mount Jackson, 48°36′02″N 113°43′19″W, el. 10,039 feet (3,060 m)
- Mount Johns, 47°57′52″N 114°11′48″W, el. 3,589 feet (1,094 m)
- Mount Liebig, 48°18′29″N 113°43′58″W, el. 8,015 feet (2,443 m)
- Mount May, 47°59′29″N 113°00′54″W, el. 6,975 feet (2,126 m)
- Mount Murray, 48°16′32″N 113°46′01″W, el. 7,093 feet (2,162 m)
- Mount Oberlin, 48°42′16″N 113°44′09″W, el. 8,064 feet (2,458 m)
- Mount Orvis Evans, 48°00′49″N 113°51′57″W, el. 7,434 feet (2,266 m)
- Mount Peabody, 48°55′47″N 114°08′26″W, el. 9,098 feet (2,773 m)
- Mount Penrose, 48°24′34″N 113°50′14″W, el. 7,818 feet (2,383 m)
- Mount Phillips, 48°28′40″N 113°31′30″W, el. 9,498 feet (2,895 m)
- Mount Pinchot, 48°29′44″N 113°35′42″W, el. 9,304 feet (2,836 m)
- Mount Rockwell, 48°26′36″N 113°27′04″W, el. 9,265 feet (2,824 m)
- Mount Saint Nicholas, 48°23′30″N 113°33′01″W, el. 9,304 feet (2,836 m)
- Mount Shields, 48°16′32″N 113°30′57″W, el. 7,129 feet (2,173 m)
- Mount Stimson, 48°30′52″N 113°36′37″W, el. 10,092 feet (3,076 m)
- Mount Swaney, 48°24′32″N 114°46′42″W, el. 6,319 feet (1,926 m)
- Mount Thompson, 48°32′45″N 113°41′16″W, el. 8,501 feet (2,591 m)
- Mount Thompson-Seton, 48°52′13″N 114°39′06″W, el. 7,815 feet (2,382 m)
- Mount Vaught, 48°40′51″N 113°52′26″W, el. 8,789 feet (2,679 m)
- Mount Young, 48°48′02″N 114°37′49″W, el. 7,280 feet (2,220 m)
- Mud Lake Mountain, 47°38′32″N 113°18′49″W, el. 6,339 feet (1,932 m)
- Murr Peak, 47°57′19″N 114°51′15″W, el. 6,762 feet (2,061 m)
- Nahsukin Mountain, 48°50′28″N 113°59′22″W, el. 8,172 feet (2,491 m)
- Nasukoin Mountain, 48°47′43″N 114°34′42″W, el. 8,048 feet (2,453 m)
- Norris Mountain, 48°34′37″N 113°32′01″W, el. 8,911 feet (2,716 m)
- Numa Peak, 48°54′12″N 114°09′40″W, el. 8,917 feet (2,718 m)
- Nyack Mountain, 48°23′44″N 113°48′56″W, el. 7,664 feet (2,336 m)
- Oreamnos Peak, 47°41′38″N 113°34′04″W, el. 7,940 feet (2,420 m)
- Ousel Peak, 48°27′55″N 113°53′15″W, el. 7,149 feet (2,179 m)
- Owl Peak, 47°39′47″N 113°36′22″W, el. 8,241 feet (2,512 m)
- Pagoda Mountain, 47°41′40″N 113°15′14″W, el. 8,041 feet (2,451 m)
- Parke Peak, 48°56′44″N 114°14′21″W, el. 8,940 feet (2,720 m)
- Paul Bunyans Cabin, 48°44′28″N 113°56′12″W, el. 8,432 feet (2,570 m)
- Paul Mountain, 48°36′53″N 114°47′19″W, el. 5,508 feet (1,679 m)
- Pentagon Mountain, 47°55′39″N 113°07′29″W, el. 8,852 feet (2,698 m)
- Peril Peak, 48°27′23″N 113°35′25″W, el. 8,651 feet (2,637 m)
- Pilot Knob, 48°21′59″N 114°29′16″W, el. 4,272 feet (1,302 m)
- Pinehill, 47°57′22″N 114°52′33″W, el. 6,398 feet (1,950 m)
- Pivot Mountain, 47°53′39″N 113°11′40″W, el. 7,395 feet (2,254 m)
- Pleasant Valley Mountain, 48°12′30″N 114°44′52″W, el. 5,695 feet (1,736 m)
- Pot Mountain, 47°55′52″N 113°10′47″W, el. 7,648 feet (2,331 m)
- Prospector Mountain, 48°06′17″N 113°37′37″W, el. 8,087 feet (2,465 m)
- Puzzle Hills, 48°13′59″N 113°17′37″W, el. 6,548 feet (1,996 m)
- Pyramid Peak, 48°26′59″N 113°53′10″W, el. 7,260 feet (2,210 m)
- Rainbow Peak, 48°52′45″N 114°05′49″W, el. 9,803 feet (2,988 m)
- Rampage Mountain, 48°20′45″N 113°35′20″W, el. 6,821 feet (2,079 m)
- Rampart Mountain, 47°35′57″N 113°14′50″W, el. 7,726 feet (2,355 m)
- Razoredge Mountain, 48°33′24″N 113°30′58″W, el. 8,569 feet (2,612 m)
- Red Crow Mountain, 48°24′06″N 113°20′54″W, el. 7,877 feet (2,401 m)
- Red Plume Mountain, 48°08′59″N 113°18′19″W, el. 7,940 feet (2,420 m)
- Red Sky Mountain, 48°09′16″N 113°37′08″W, el. 8,136 feet (2,480 m)
- Reuter Peak, 48°54′42″N 114°12′06″W, el. 8,750 feet (2,670 m)
- Ringer Mountain, 48°01′16″N 113°07′11″W, el. 7,628 feet (2,325 m)
- Riverview Mountain, 48°22′01″N 113°36′58″W, el. 6,381 feet (1,945 m)
- Rogers Peak, 48°41′11″N 113°56′14″W, el. 7,319 feet (2,231 m)
- Running Rabbit Mountain, 48°15′32″N 113°32′27″W, el. 7,684 feet (2,342 m)
- Salmon Point, 47°37′14″N 113°24′29″W, el. 6,922 feet (2,110 m)
- Salt Mountain, 47°41′09″N 113°08′55″W, el. 8,251 feet (2,515 m)
- Salvage Mountain, 48°22′29″N 113°32′10″W, el. 8,225 feet (2,507 m)
- Sanders Mountain, 48°17′26″N 114°50′12″W, el. 6,010 feet (1,830 m)
- Sarah Peak, 47°46′55″N 113°26′58″W, el. 7,349 feet (2,240 m)
- Scalplock Mountain, 48°18′00″N 113°34′29″W, el. 6,886 feet (2,099 m)
- Sergeant Mountain, 47°53′43″N 113°19′51″W, el. 7,454 feet (2,272 m)
- Shadow Mountain, 47°54′49″N 113°10′17″W, el. 7,634 feet (2,327 m)
- Sheep Mountain, 48°20′30″N 113°28′15″W, el. 8,530 feet (2,600 m)
- Sheepherder Hill, 48°12′06″N 114°23′30″W, el. 3,248 feet (990 m)
- Silvertip Mountain, 47°47′04″N 113°15′02″W, el. 8,855 feet (2,699 m)
- Sixmile Mountain, 47°59′11″N 113°50′39″W, el. 7,379 feet (2,249 m)
- Skeleton Mountain, 48°22′18″N 113°21′43″W, el. 7,470 feet (2,280 m)
- Slick Rock, 47°44′47″N 113°25′34″W, el. 6,739 feet (2,054 m)
- Slideout Peak, 48°01′01″N 113°03′33″W, el. 7,106 feet (2,166 m)
- Slippery Bill Mountain, 48°11′26″N 113°15′58″W, el. 7,421 feet (2,262 m)
- Snow Peak, 47°40′55″N 113°27′02″W, el. 8,156 feet (2,486 m)
- Snowshed Mountain, 48°14′37″N 113°38′01″W, el. 7,408 feet (2,258 m)
- Snowslip Mountain, 48°15′45″N 113°30′57″W, el. 7,228 feet (2,203 m)
- Soakem Mountain, 48°01′28″N 113°20′06″W, el. 7,487 feet (2,282 m)
- Soldier Mountain, 47°57′20″N 113°37′18″W, el. 6,578 feet (2,005 m)
- Soldier Mountain, 48°20′27″N 113°30′03″W, el. 7,306 feet (2,227 m)
- Solitude Point, 47°38′58″N 113°20′56″W, el. 4,737 feet (1,444 m)
- Sphinx Peak, 47°38′13″N 113°08′40″W, el. 8,501 feet (2,591 m)
- Spotted Bear Mountain, 47°54′06″N 113°26′13″W, el. 7,175 feet (2,187 m)
- Spruce Point, 48°10′07″N 113°35′09″W, el. 6,860 feet (2,090 m)
- Spy Mountain, 48°00′50″N 113°25′29″W, el. 7,103 feet (2,165 m)
- Square Mountain, 48°12′44″N 113°18′34″W, el. 6,988 feet (2,130 m)
- Square Peak, 48°52′00″N 114°06′16″W, el. 8,606 feet (2,623 m)
- Stadium Peak, 47°40′44″N 113°30′03″W, el. 8,402 feet (2,561 m)
- Standard Peak, 48°32′31″N 114°14′49″W, el. 7,188 feet (2,191 m)
- Stanton Mountain, 48°39′36″N 113°53′39″W, el. 7,756 feet (2,364 m)
- Statuary Mountain, 48°23′30″N 113°29′30″W, el. 8,192 feet (2,497 m)
- Stony Hill, 47°55′14″N 113°35′19″W, el. 7,136 feet (2,175 m)
- Strawberry Mountain, 48°12′47″N 113°58′53″W, el. 6,204 feet (1,891 m)
- Sunday Mountain, 48°35′35″N 114°51′04″W, el. 5,502 feet (1,677 m)
- Swanberg Mountain, 48°28′17″N 114°01′22″W, el. 3,550 feet (1,080 m)
- Table Hill, 47°52′23″N 113°08′00″W, el. 6,129 feet (1,868 m)
- Table Mountain, 47°53′25″N 113°06′38″W, el. 8,320 feet (2,540 m)
- Tally Mountain, 48°23′14″N 114°35′04″W, el. 5,331 feet (1,625 m)
- Teakettle Mountain, 48°24′12″N 114°06′20″W, el. 5,876 feet (1,791 m)
- Tent Mountain, 48°09′21″N 113°12′14″W, el. 7,188 feet (2,191 m)
- Tepee Mountain, 47°52′33″N 114°49′43″W, el. 6,568 feet (2,002 m)
- Three Eagles Mountain, 48°06′44″N 113°52′13″W, el. 7,447 feet (2,270 m)
- Threesuns Mountain, 48°29′25″N 113°39′23″W, el. 7,913 feet (2,412 m)
- Threetops Mountain, 48°27′28″N 113°42′17″W, el. 6,749 feet (2,057 m)
- Thunderbolt Mountain, 47°51′56″N 113°40′34″W, el. 7,762 feet (2,366 m)
- Tinkham Mountain, 48°31′30″N 113°30′23″W, el. 8,254 feet (2,516 m)
- Tom Tom Mountain, 48°03′28″N 113°51′49″W, el. 7,057 feet (2,151 m)
- Tongue Mountain, 48°11′49″N 113°55′32″W, el. 6,834 feet (2,083 m)
- Tranquil Mountain, 47°49′48″N 113°37′44″W, el. 7,218 feet (2,200 m)
- Trapper Peak, 48°48′51″N 113°57′23″W, el. 7,703 feet (2,348 m)
- Triangle Peak, 48°25′17″N 113°53′09″W, el. 7,526 feet (2,294 m)
- Trilobite Peak, 47°58′52″N 113°08′55″W, el. 8,163 feet (2,488 m)
- Trinity Mountain, 48°07′02″N 113°23′28″W, el. 7,579 feet (2,310 m)
- Triple Divide Peak, 48°34′23″N 113°31′00″W, el. 7,982 feet (2,433 m)
- Tuchuck Mountain, 48°58′35″N 114°40′30″W, el. 7,746 feet (2,361 m)
- Turtlehead Mountain, 47°39′38″N 113°15′00″W, el. 8,159 feet (2,487 m)
- Twin Mountain, 48°04′44″N 113°27′55″W, el. 7,329 feet (2,234 m)
- Unawah Mountain, 48°10′15″N 113°38′56″W, el. 7,854 feet (2,394 m)
- Union Mountain, 48°03′21″N 113°16′41″W, el. 7,615 feet (2,321 m)
- Vance Hill, 48°46′15″N 114°18′02″W, el. 3,730 feet (1,140 m)
- Vigil Peak, 48°24′57″N 113°29′03″W, el. 8,527 feet (2,599 m)
- Vinegar Mountain, 48°10′48″N 113°30′47″W, el. 7,103 feet (2,165 m)
- Vulture Peak, 48°50′14″N 114°01′26″W, el. 9,616 feet (2,931 m)
- Walton Mountain, 48°34′32″N 113°43′58″W, el. 8,917 feet (2,718 m)
- Warrior Mountain, 47°49′14″N 113°39′44″W, el. 7,766 feet (2,367 m)
- Wedge Mountain, 48°53′27″N 114°29′59″W, el. 6,499 feet (1,981 m)
- Werner Peak, 48°34′38″N 114°25′59″W, el. 6,939 feet (2,115 m)
- Whale Buttes, 48°51′15″N 114°27′50″W, el. 5,305 feet (1,617 m)
- Whitcomb Peak, 47°59′01″N 113°21′21″W, el. 7,221 feet (2,201 m)
- Whitefish Mountain, 48°45′13″N 114°36′01″W, el. 7,329 feet (2,234 m)
- Wickiup Mountain, 48°01′49″N 113°48′25″W, el. 7,270 feet (2,220 m)
- Wild Bill Mountain, 48°00′34″N 114°27′51″W, el. 6,007 feet (1,831 m)
- Wild Horse Mountain, 48°03′22″N 114°23′25″W, el. 5,190 feet (1,580 m)
- Wildcat Mountain, 48°14′38″N 113°55′28″W, el. 6,565 feet (2,001 m)
- Wildrose Mountain, 48°05′28″N 113°20′50″W, el. 7,247 feet (2,209 m)
- Winter Points, 48°03′33″N 113°03′13″W, el. 7,159 feet (2,182 m)
- Wolf Gun Mountain, 48°44′58″N 113°59′41″W, el. 7,949 feet (2,423 m)
- Wolftail Mountain, 48°26′26″N 113°36′38″W, el. 8,176 feet (2,492 m)*

== See also ==
- List of mountains in Montana
- List of mountain ranges in Montana
