= Tally Mountain =

Tally Mountain may refer to:

- Tally Mountain (Georgia), two different mountain peaks in Georgia
- Tally Mountain (Montana), a mountain in Flathead County, Montana
