= Buffalo Woman Lake =

Lake in the American state of Montana

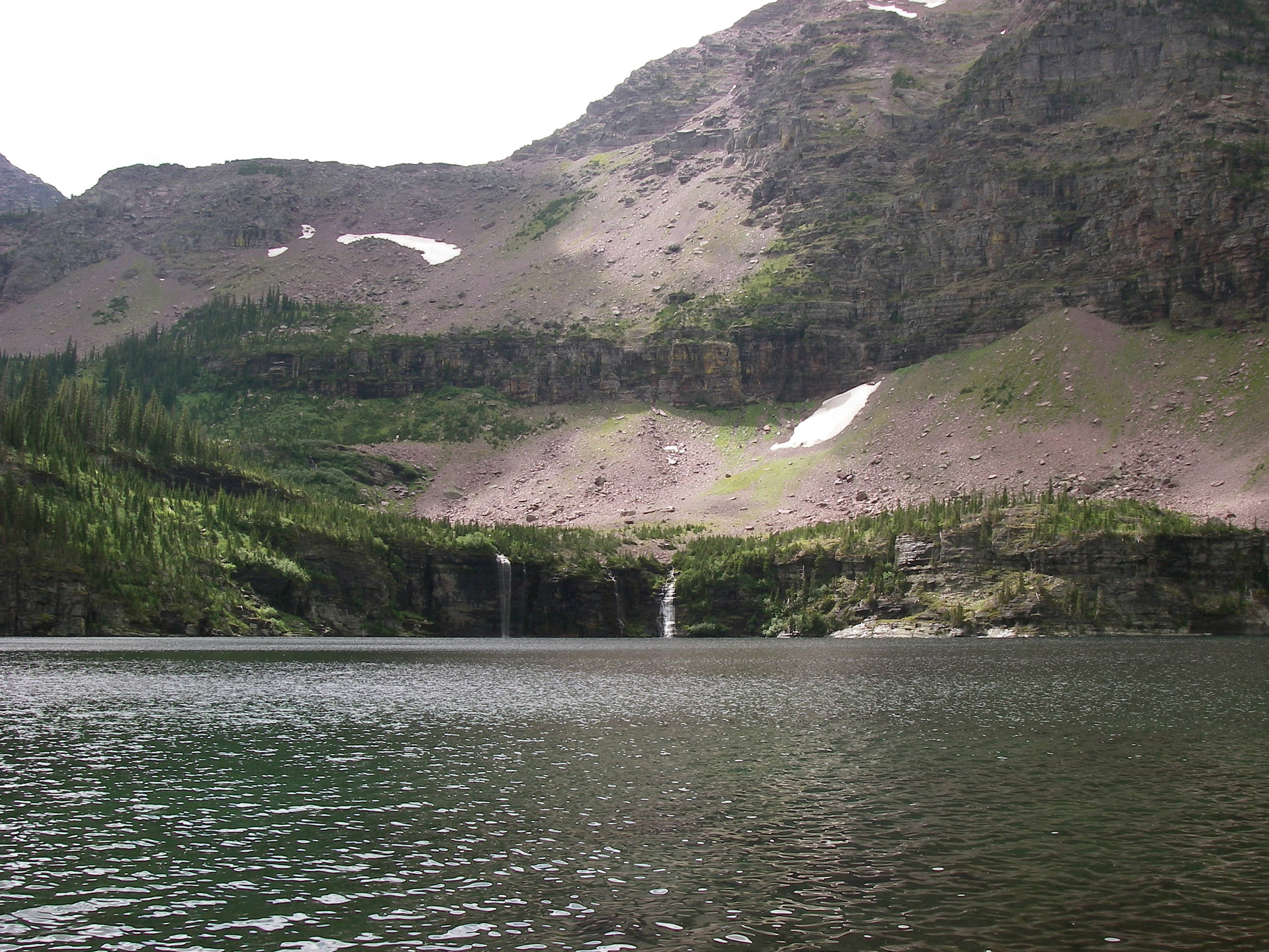
- Buffalo Woman Lake below Eaglehead Mt.

- Location within Montana Location within the United States
- Location: Glacier National Park, Flathead County, Montana, US
- Coordinates: 48°28′29″N 113°35′11″W
- Lake type: Natural
- Primary outflows: Coal Creek
- Basin countries: United States
- Max. length: .45 mi (0.72 km)
- Max. width: .25 mi (0.40 km)
- Surface elevation: 6,090 ft (1,860 m)

Buffalo Woman Lake is located in Glacier National Park, in the U. S. state of Montana. Buffalo Woman Lake is east of Eaglehead Mountain and .60 miles (0.97 km) south of Beaver Woman Lake.

The name, Buffalo Woman Lake, was officially approved by the United States Geographic Board (now known as the United States Board on Geographic Names) on March 6, 1929. The name Buffalo Woman was recommended by Howard A. Noble, General Manager of the Glacier Park Hotel, and approved by the National Park Service. According to the Geographic Board's decision card, the name is associated with the Native American tribe known as the Blackfeet.

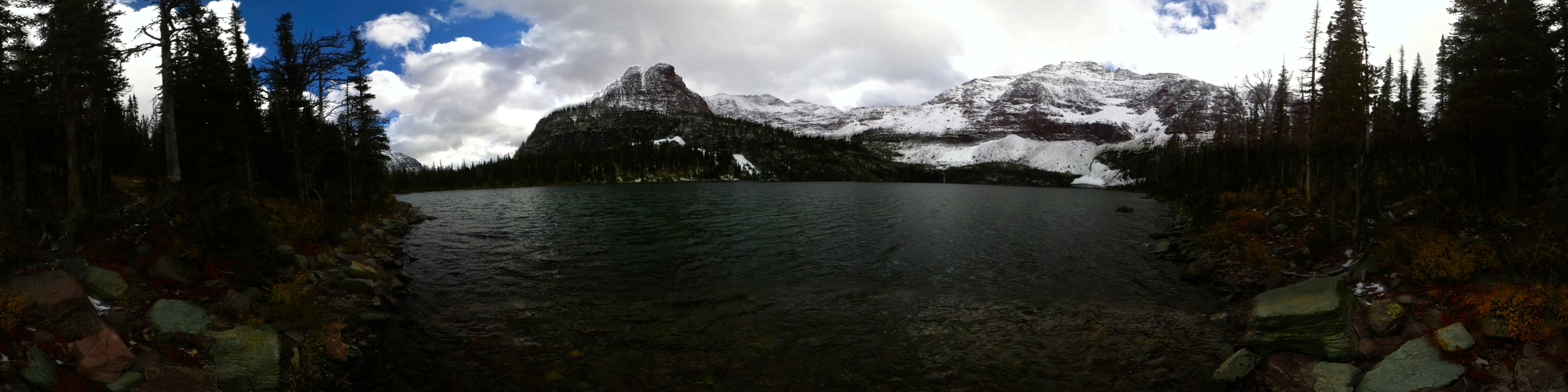
Panorama

== See also ==
- List of lakes in Flathead County, Montana (A-L)
- Beaver Woman Lake
- Mount Pinchot (Montana)
- Mount Saint Nicholas
