= Rampage =

Rampage may refer to:

== People ==
- Rampage (rapper) (born 1974)
- Rampage Jackson (born 1978), American mixed martial artist and actor
- Randy Rampage (1960-2018), Canadian musician

== Arts, entertainment, and media ==
=== Fictional characters ===
- Rampage (DC Comics), a supervillainess
- Rampage (Marvel Comics), a supervillain
- Rampage (Transformers), any of several characters in the Transformers universes
- Rampage, a character from the G.I. Joe: A Real American Hero franchise

=== Films ===
- Rampage (1963 film), an American adventure film
- Rampage (1986 film), a Turkish action film
- Rampage (1987 film), an American crime drama
- Rampage (2006 film), a documentary by George Gittoes
- Rampage (2009 film), a thriller by Uwe Boll
- Rampage (2018 film), a monster film inspired by the video game of the same name
- Rampage: The Hillside Strangler Murders, a 2006 direct-to-video film

=== Music ===
- "Rampage" (song), a 1991 single by EPMD and LL Cool J
- The Rampage, Japanese pop group

=== Video games ===
- Rampage (franchise), a video game franchise
  - Rampage (video game), the first game in the Rampage series
  - Rampage (2018 video game), based on the 2018 film

=== Other arts, entertainment, and media ===
- AEW Rampage, a professional wrestling television program
- "Rampage" (CSI: Miami), a TV episode
- "Rampage" (Star Wars: The Bad Batch), a TV episode
- Rampage, either of two Marvel UK comics
- Rampage, former name of the board game Terror in Meeple City

== Sports ==
- Rampage (mascot), for the Los Angeles Rams
- Grand Rapids Rampage, an Arena Football League team
- Milwaukee Rampage, a defunct association football team
- Red Bull Rampage, a mountain bike competition
- San Antonio Rampage, an ice hockey team
- Rampage, former name of the Japanese esports organisation Pentagram

== Other uses ==
- Rampage Mountain, in Montana
- Rampage (roller coaster), at Alabama Splash Adventure
- AST RAMpage, a computer memory expansion board and standard
- Dodge Rampage, a 1980s subcompact unibody pickup truck
- Ram Rampage, a compact unibody pickup truck produced since 2023
- Rampage (missile), an air-launched version of the Israeli EXTRA artillery rocket system
- Rampage, a former US retail store now part of Charlotte Russe

== See also ==
- Rampage killing
- Riot
- Running amok
