= Eaglehead Mountain =

Mountain in Montana, United States

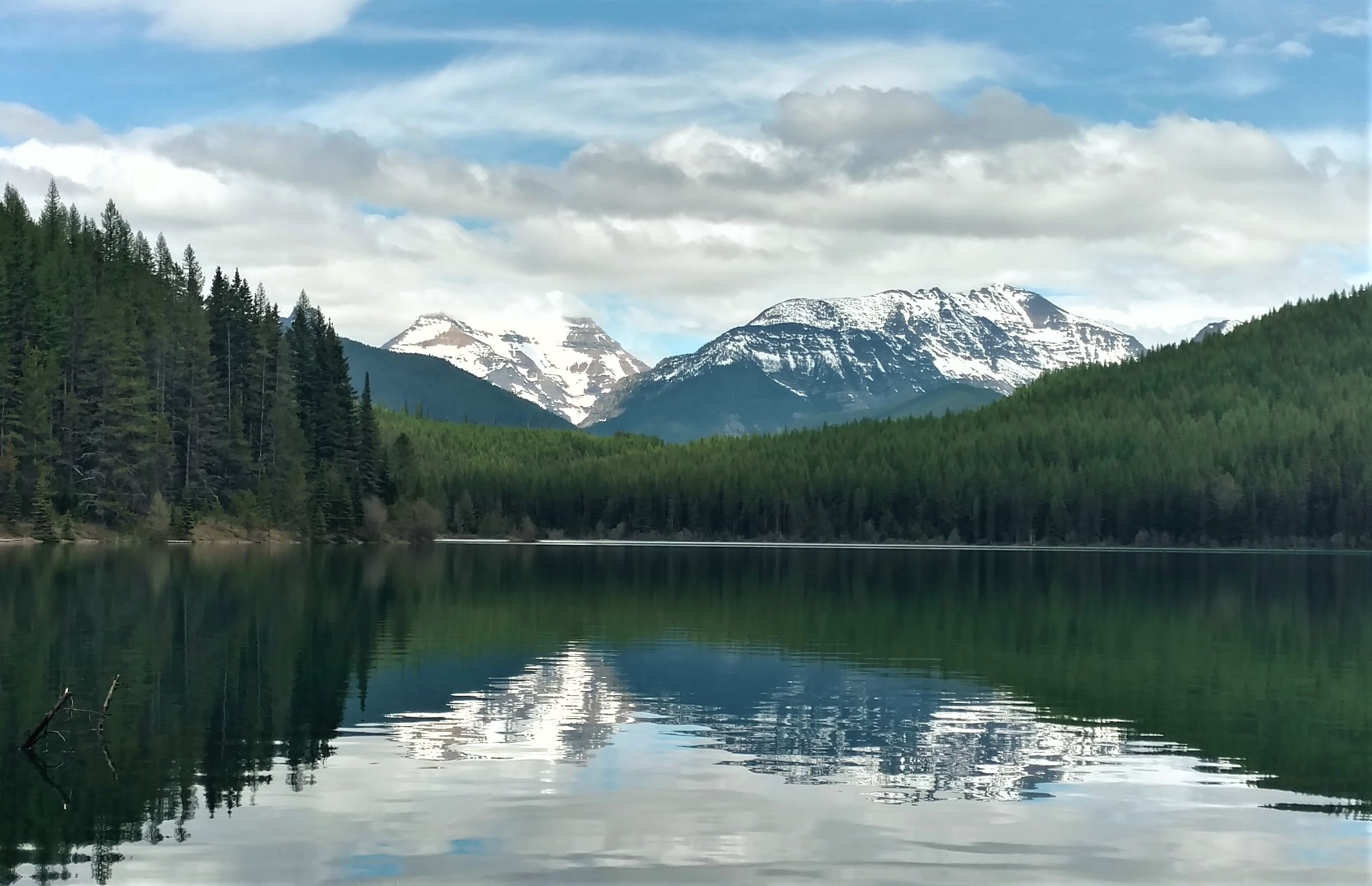
- Eaglehead Mountain on right, over Stanton Lake. Mount Stimson on the left. Looking northwest.

Highest point
- Elevation: 9,145 ft (2,787 m)
- Prominence: 1,620 ft (490 m)
- Coordinates: 48°28′25″N 113°36′19″W

Geography
- Location within Montana Location within the United States
- Location: Flathead County, Montana, U.S.
- Parent range: Lewis Range
- Topo map(s): USGS Mount Saint Nicholas, MT

Eaglehead Mountain (9,145 feet (2,787 m)) is located in the Lewis Range, Glacier National Park in the U.S. state of Montana. Buffalo Woman Lake is east of the peak.

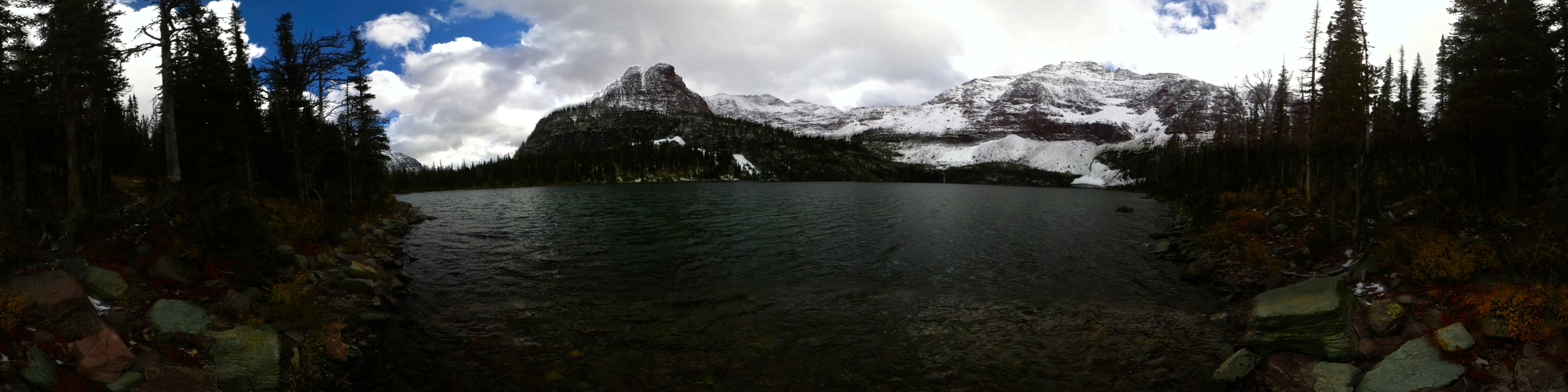
Eaglehead Mountain (right) across Buffalo Woman Lake

== See also ==
- Mountains and mountain ranges of Glacier National Park (U.S.)
