= Beaver Woman Lake =

Lake in Flathead County, Montana

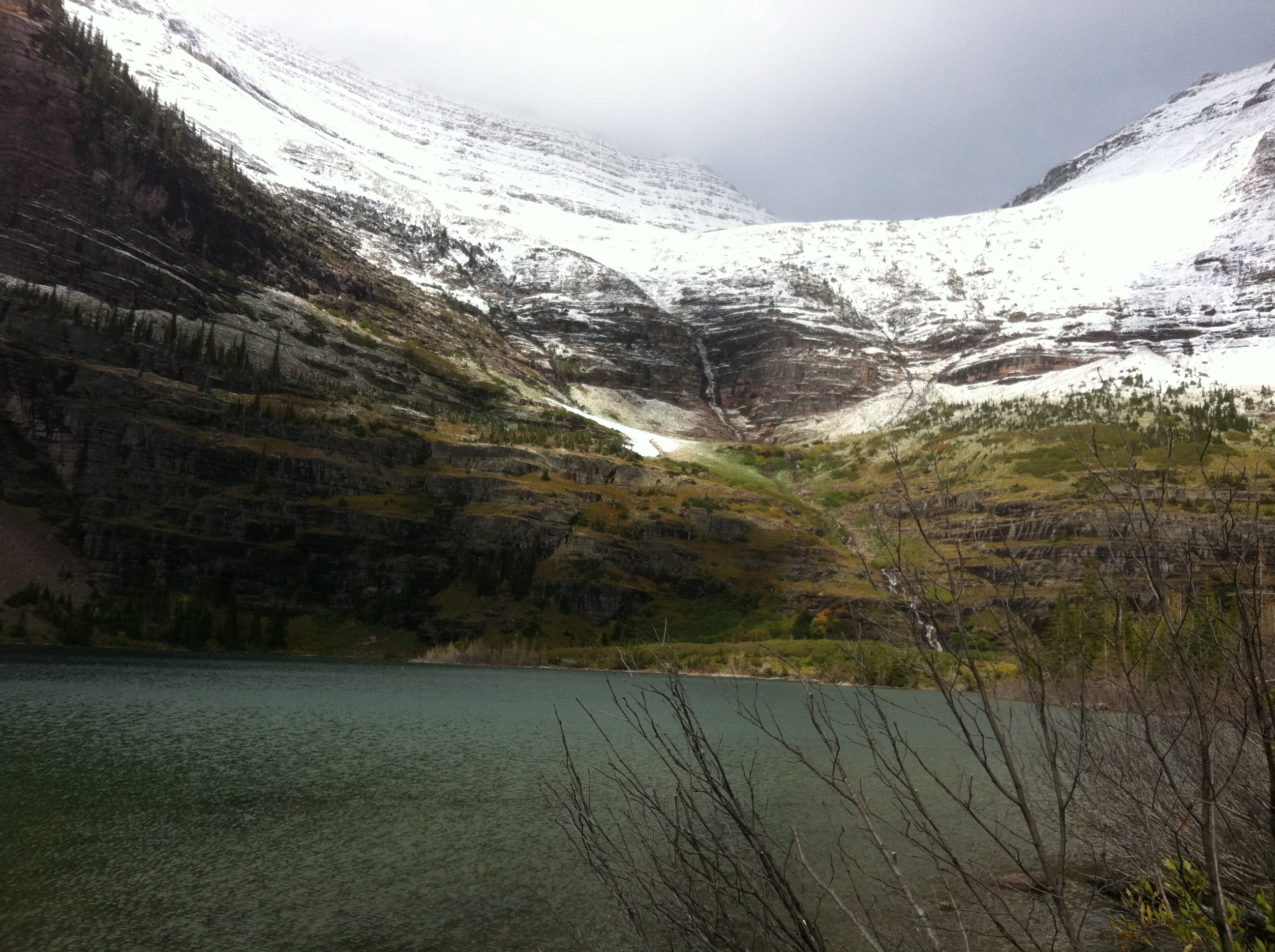
- Beaver Woman Lake

- Location within Montana Location within the United States
- Location: Glacier National Park, Flathead County, Montana, US
- Coordinates: 48°29′09″N 113°34′40″W
- Lake type: Natural
- Primary outflows: Coal Creek
- Basin countries: United States
- Max. length: .30 mi (0.48 km)
- Max. width: .25 mi (0.40 km)
- Surface elevation: 5,870 ft (1,790 m)

Beaver Woman Lake is located in Glacier National Park, in the U. S. state of Montana. Beaver Woman Lake is in the northwest part of Martha's Basin southeast of Mount Pinchot and 0.6 miles (0.97 km) north of Buffalo Woman Lake.

The name, Beaver Woman, was submitted to the United States Board on Geographic Names by the National Park Service in 1939 and officially approved on April 24, 1940.

== See also ==
- List of lakes in Flathead County, Montana (A-L)
- Buffalo Woman Lake
- Mount Pinchot (Montana)
- Mount Saint Nicholas
