= Elk Mountain (Flathead County, Montana) =

Mountain in the American state of Montana

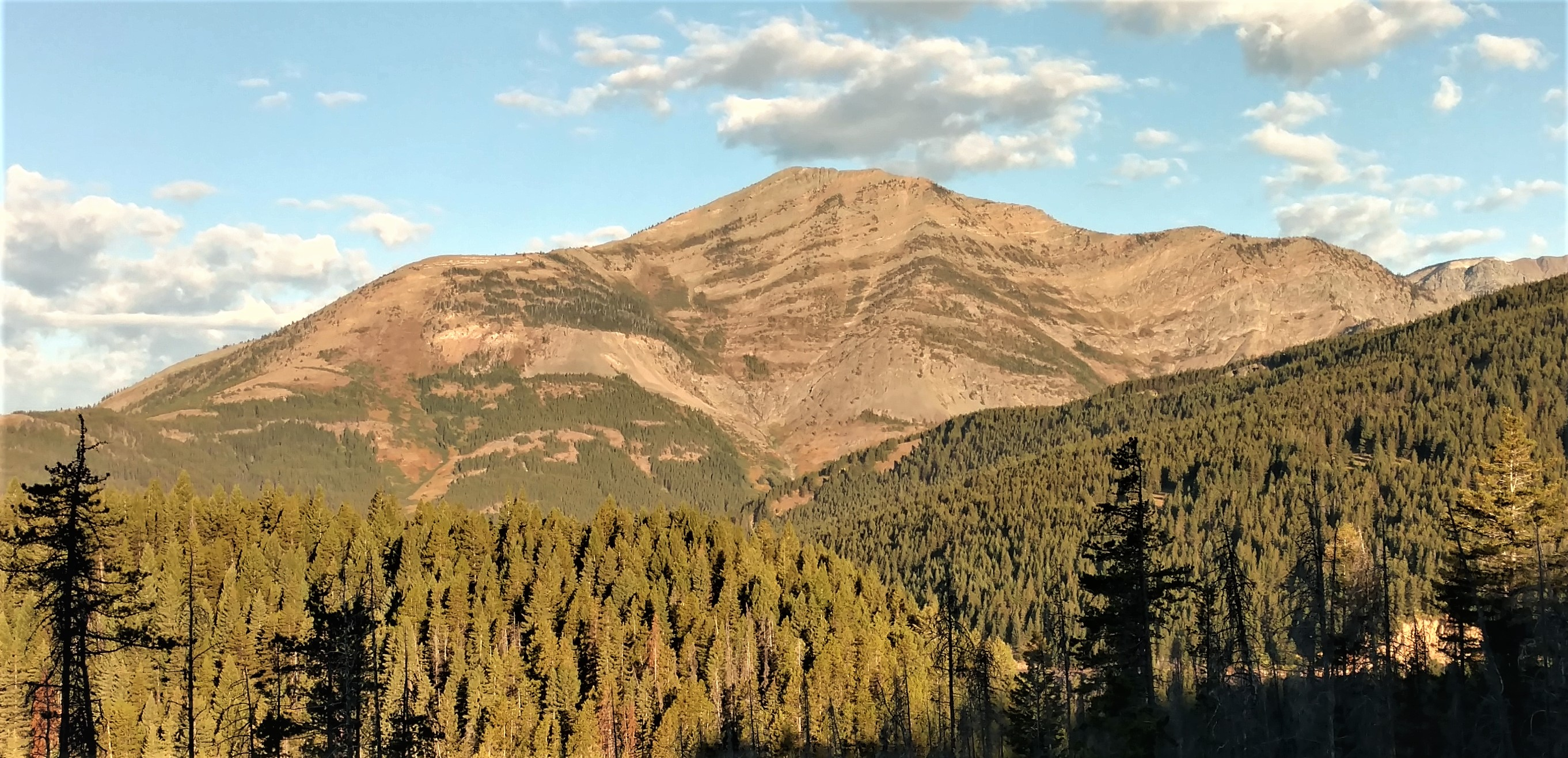
- East aspect

Highest point
- Elevation: 7,835 ft (2,388 m)
- Prominence: 1,267 ft (386 m)
- Parent peak: Little Dog Mountain (8,610 ft)
- Isolation: 2.71 mi (4.36 km)
- Coordinates: 48°18′24″N 113°26′40″W

Naming
- Etymology: Elk

Geography
- Location within Montana Location within the United States
- Location: Glacier National Park; Flathead County, Montana, U.S.
- Parent range: Lewis Range; Rocky Mountains
- Topo map: USGS Blacktail

Climbing
- Easiest route: class 1 steep trail

Elk Mountain is a 7,835-foot-elevation (2,388-meter) mountain summit located in Flathead County in the U.S. state of Montana. It is situated in the southern tip of Glacier National Park, in the Lewis Range, about four miles to the west side of the Continental Divide. US Highway 2 and the Hi-Line Subdivision of the BNSF Railway traverse the southern base of this mountain, approximately four miles west of Marias Pass. Topographic relief is significant as the northwest aspect rises 3,400 feet (1,000 meters) above Ole Creek in one mile. The nearest higher neighbor is Sheep Mountain 2.7 miles to the north-northwest. The mountain's name first appeared on a 1914 USGS map, and was officially adopted in 1929 by the United States Board on Geographic Names. The summit is the site of a former fire lookout that was built in the 1930s, and removed in 1963.

== Geology ==
Like other mountains in Glacier National Park, Elk Mountain is composed of sedimentary rock laid down during the Precambrian to Jurassic periods. Formed in shallow seas, this sedimentary rock was initially uplifted beginning 170 million years ago when the Lewis Overthrust fault pushed an enormous slab of precambrian rocks 3 mi (4.8 km) thick, 50 miles (80 km) wide and 160 miles (260 km) long over younger rock of the cretaceous period.

== Climate ==
According to the Köppen climate classification system, Elk Mountain is located in an alpine subarctic climate zone with long, cold, snowy winters, and cool to warm summers. Winter temperatures can drop below −10 °F with wind chill factors below −30 °F. Due to its altitude, it receives precipitation all year, as snow in winter, and as thunderstorms in summer. Precipitation runoff from the mountain drains into Autumn and Ole Creeks, which are both tributaries of Middle Fork Flathead River. This climate supports a Lodgepole pine forest on its lower slopes.

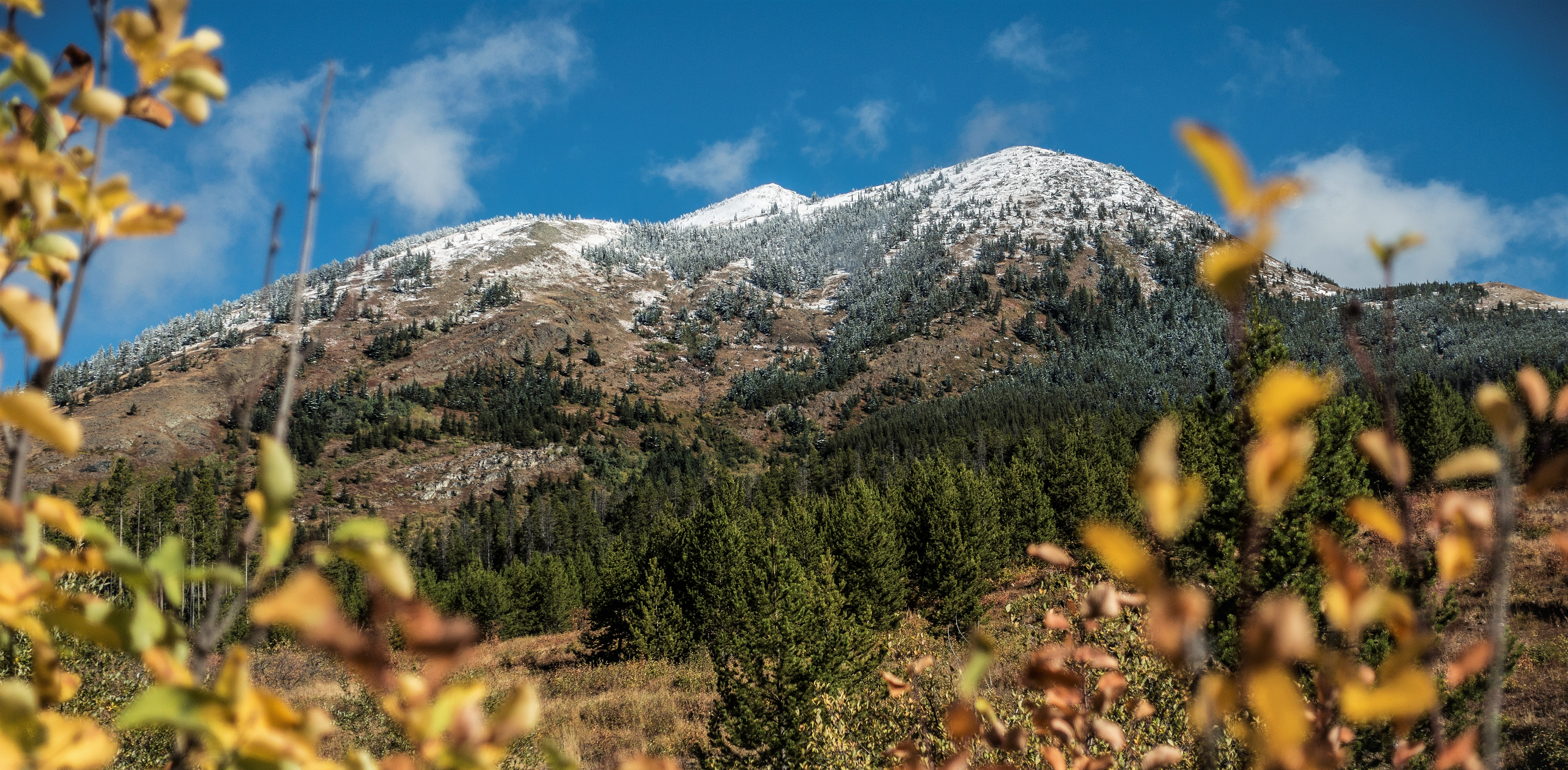
Fresh snow on Elk Mountain

== See also ==
- Mountains and mountain ranges of Glacier National Park (U.S.)
- Geology of the Rocky Mountains
