= Mount Vaught =

Mountain in Montana, United States

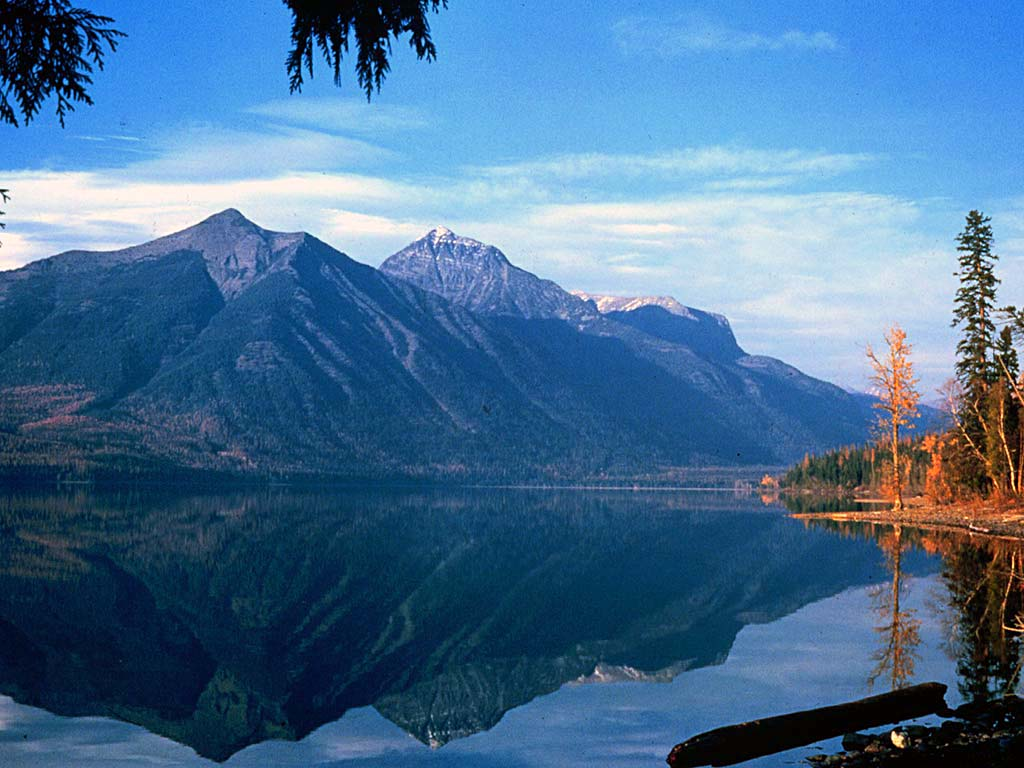
- Mount Vaught centered, Stanton Mountain to left

Highest point
- Elevation: 8,854 ft (2,699 m)
- Prominence: 1,170 ft (360 m)
- Coordinates: 48°40′51″N 113°52′26″W

Naming
- Etymology: Lawrence O. Vaught

Geography
- Location within Montana Location within the United States
- Location: Flathead County, Montana, U.S.
- Parent range: Livingston Range
- Topo map(s): USGS Mount Cannon, MT

Climbing
- Easiest route: Scramble

Mount Vaught (8,854 feet (2,699 m)) is located in the Livingston Range, Glacier National Park in the U.S. state of Montana. Mount Vaught is just over 2 miles (3.2 km) SSW of Heavens Peak. The mountain is named for Lawrence O. Vaught, a lawyer from Jacksonville, Illinois, who spent many of his summers in Glacier Park and corresponded with George Bird Grinnell, who named many of the features in the park.

== Climate ==
Based on the Köppen climate classification, the peak is located in an alpine subarctic climate zone with long, cold, snowy winters, and cool to warm summers. Temperatures can drop below −10 °F with wind chill factors below −30 °F.

== See also ==
- List of mountains and mountain ranges of Glacier National Park (U.S.)
