= Sheep Mountain (Flathead County, Montana) =

Mountain in Montana, United States

- Location within Montana Location within the United States

Highest point
- Elevation: 8,537 ft (2,602 m) NAVD 88
- Prominence: 1,009 ft (308 m)
- Listing: Mountains in Flathead County
- Coordinates: 48°20′30″N 113°28′15″W

Geography
- Location: Flathead County, Montana, U.S.
- Parent range: Lewis Range
- Topo map(s): USGS Blacktail, MT

Climbing
- Easiest route: class 3

Sheep Mountain (8,537 feet (2,602 m)) is located in the Lewis Range, Glacier National Park in the U.S. state of Montana.

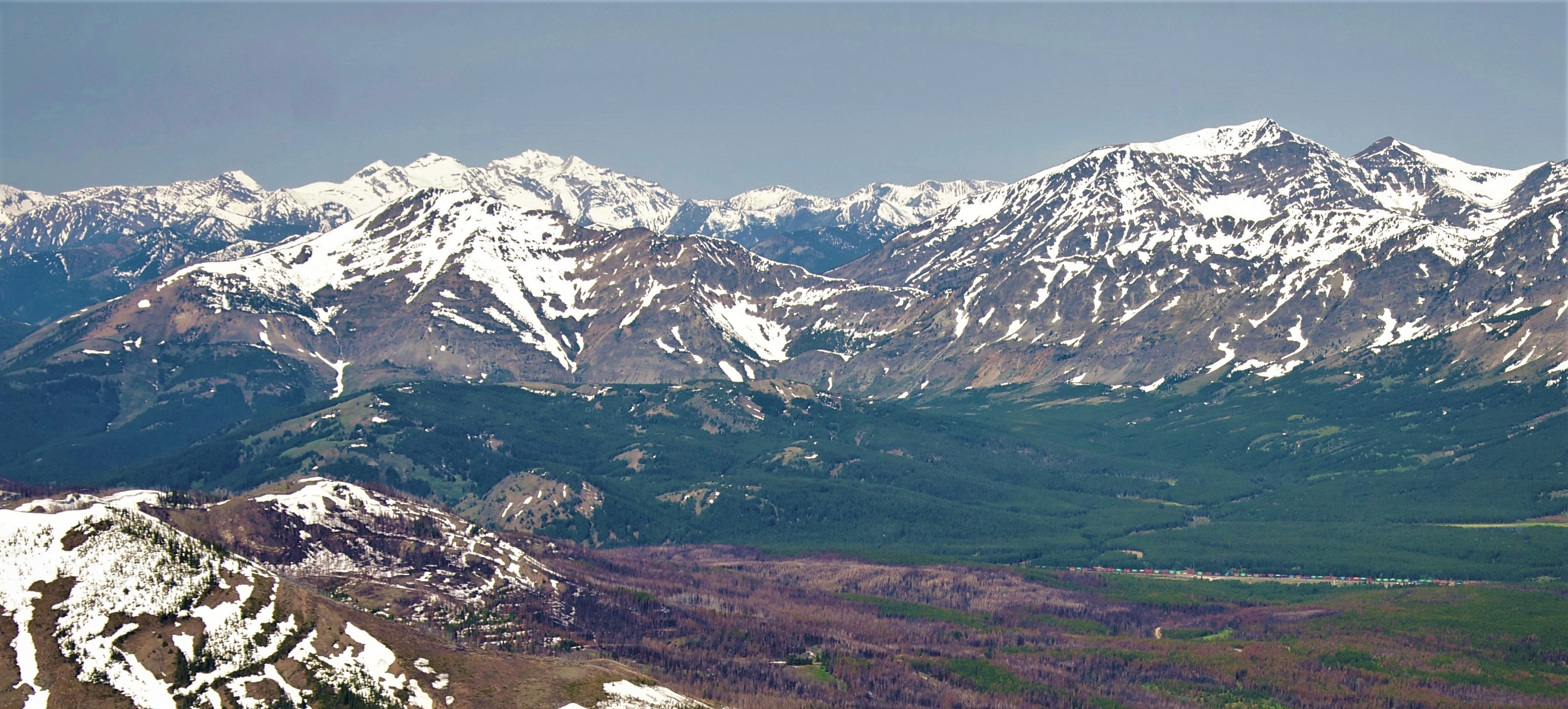
Aerial view of Elk Mountain (left) and Sheep Mountain (right)

== See also ==
- List of mountains and mountain ranges of Glacier National Park (U.S.)
