= Tally Mountain (Georgia) =

Mountains in Georgia, United States

Tally Mountain is a name used to describe two different mountain peaks located in two different Georgia counties.

== Haralson County ==
- Tally Mountain, elevation 1,522 feet (464 m), is a summit located southeast of Tallapoosa. (33°43′8.06″N 85°15′38.95″W) The mountain's native Creek Indian name was "Chun-ne-mic-co".

== Pickens County ==
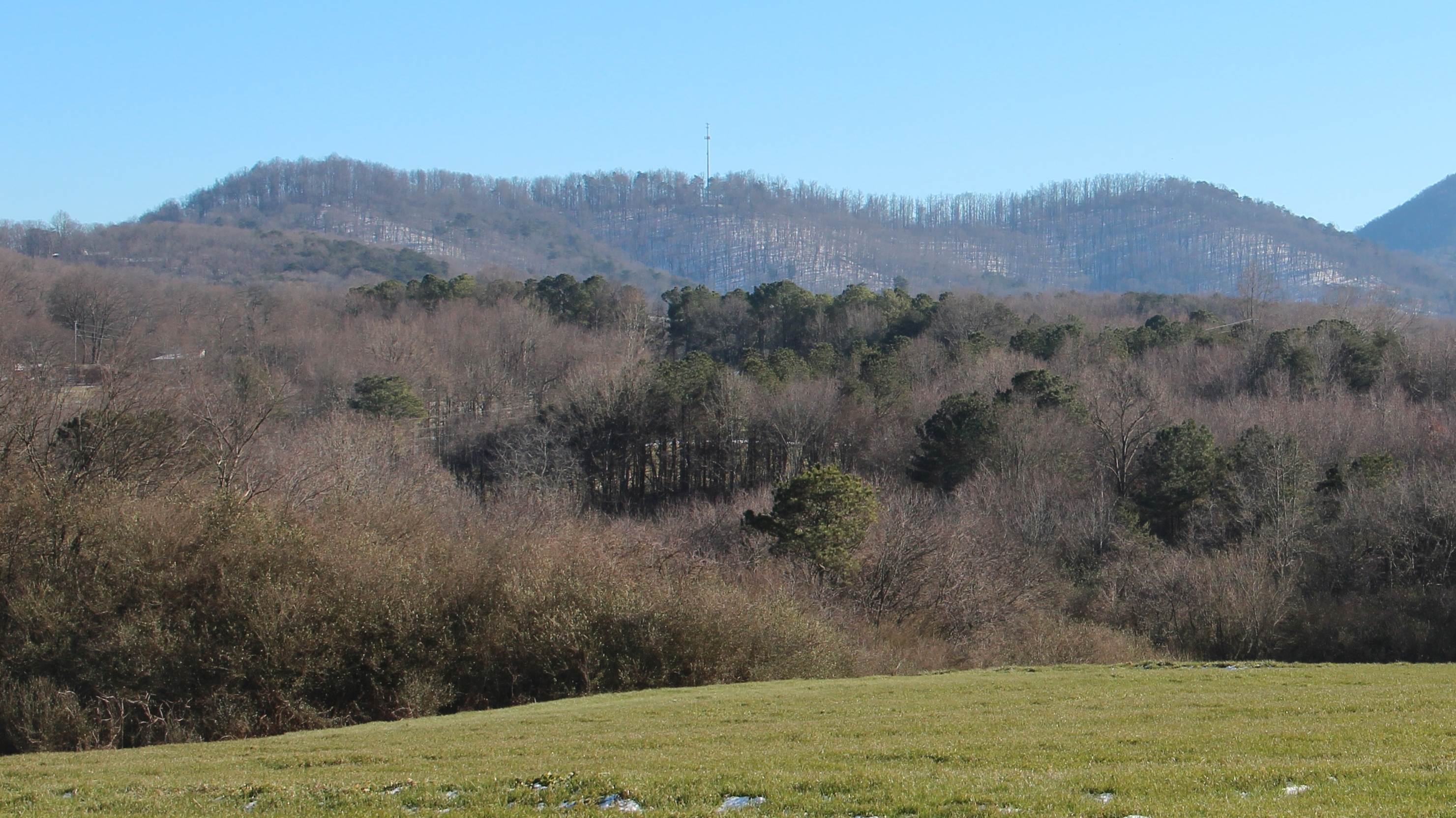
Tally Mountain (Pickens County) covered in snow

- Tally Mountain, elevation 1,995 feet (608 m), is a summit located west of Jasper near Sharp Mountain. (34°26′51.70″N 84°30′26.68″W)
