= Heavens Peak =

Mountain in Montana, United States

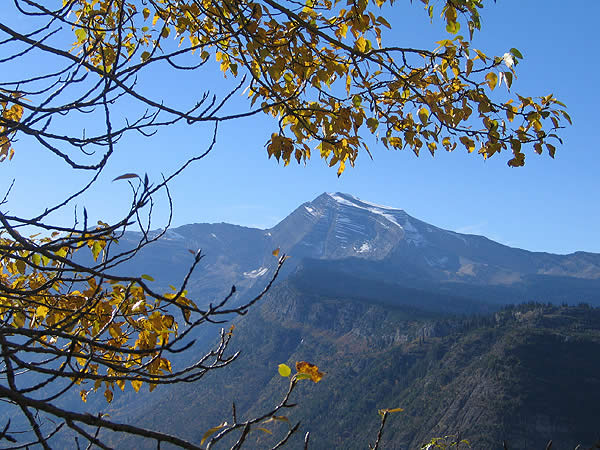
- Heavens Peak

Highest point
- Elevation: 8,991 ft (2,740 m)
- Prominence: 3,067 ft (935 m)
- Coordinates: 48°42′32″N 113°51′22″W

Geography
- Location within Montana Location within the United States
- Location: Flathead County, Montana, U.S.
- Parent range: Livingston Range
- Topo map(s): USGS Mount Cannon, MT

Climbing
- First ascent: 1924 (Norman Clyde)

Heavens Peak (8,991 feet (2,740 m)) is located in the Livingston Range, Glacier National Park in the U.S. state of Montana. Heavens Peak is a little more than 1 mile (1.6 km) north of McPartland Mountain. The mountain's descriptive name first appeared on a map prepared by Lt. George P. Ahern, from 1888 to 1890 reconnaissance maps prepared by him. This geographical feature's name was officially adopted in 1929 by the United States Board on Geographic Names.

== Geology ==
Like other mountains in Glacier National Park, the peak is composed of sedimentary rock laid down during the Precambrian to Jurassic periods. Formed in shallow seas, this sedimentary rock was initially uplifted beginning 170 million years ago when the Lewis Overthrust fault pushed an enormous slab of precambrian rocks 3 mi (4.8 km) thick, 50 miles (80 km) wide and 160 miles (260 km) long over younger rock of the cretaceous period.

== Climate ==
Based on the Köppen climate classification, the peak is located in an alpine subarctic climate zone with long, cold, snowy winters, and cool to warm summers. Temperatures can drop below −10 °F (−23 °C) with wind chill factors below −30 °F (−34 °C).

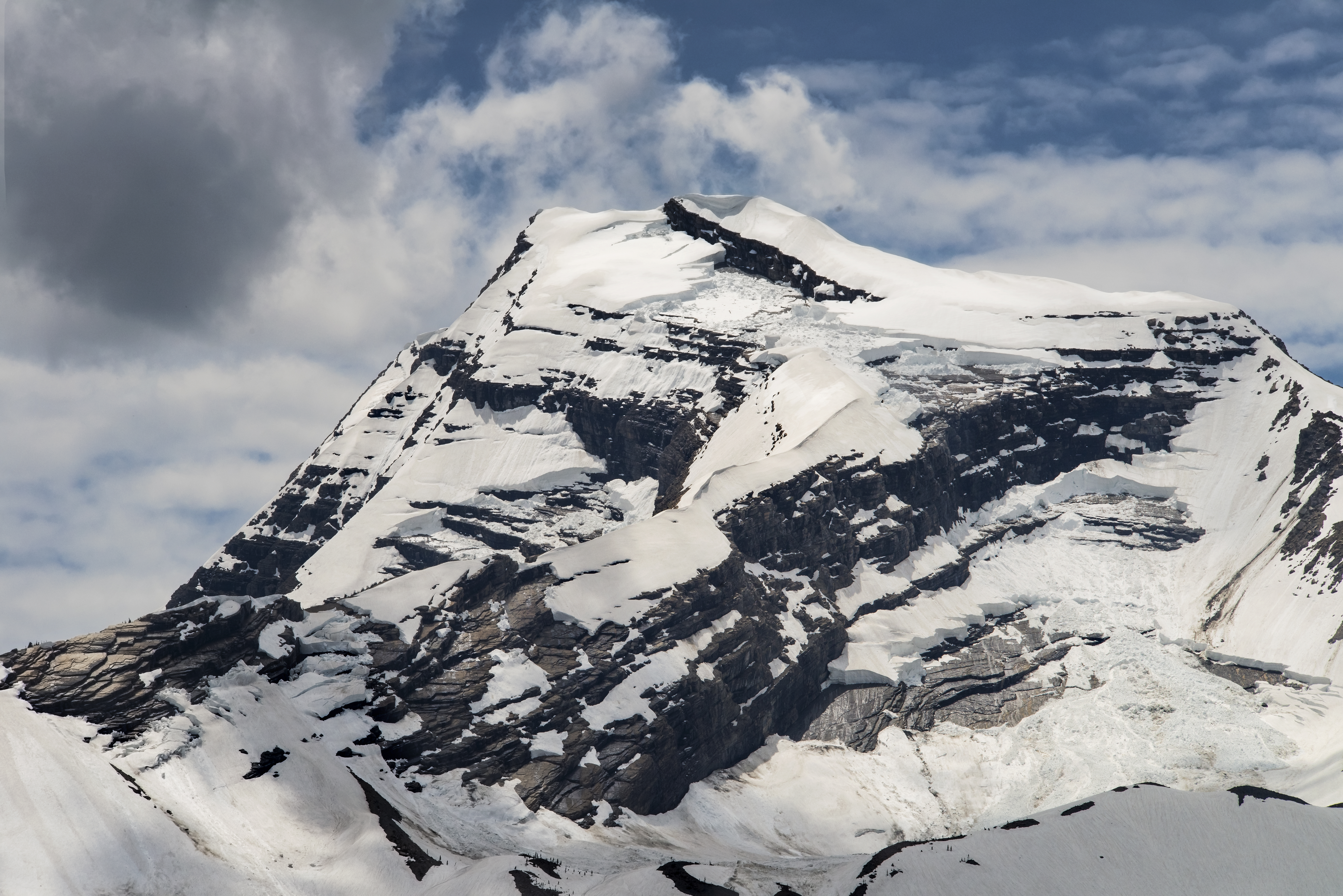
Heavens Peak

== See also ==
- Mountains and mountain ranges of Glacier National Park (U.S.)
