= Mount Thompson-Seton =

Mountain in Montana, United States

Coordinates: 48.87037°N 114.65158°W

Mount Thompson-Seton is a summit in the U.S. state of Montana. The elevation is 7,815 feet (2,382 m).

Mount Thompson-Seton was named after Ernest Thompson Seton (1860–1946), the Canadian-American scouting pioneer and author, who had paid the area a visit.
