= Mount Aeneas =

Mountain in Montana, United States

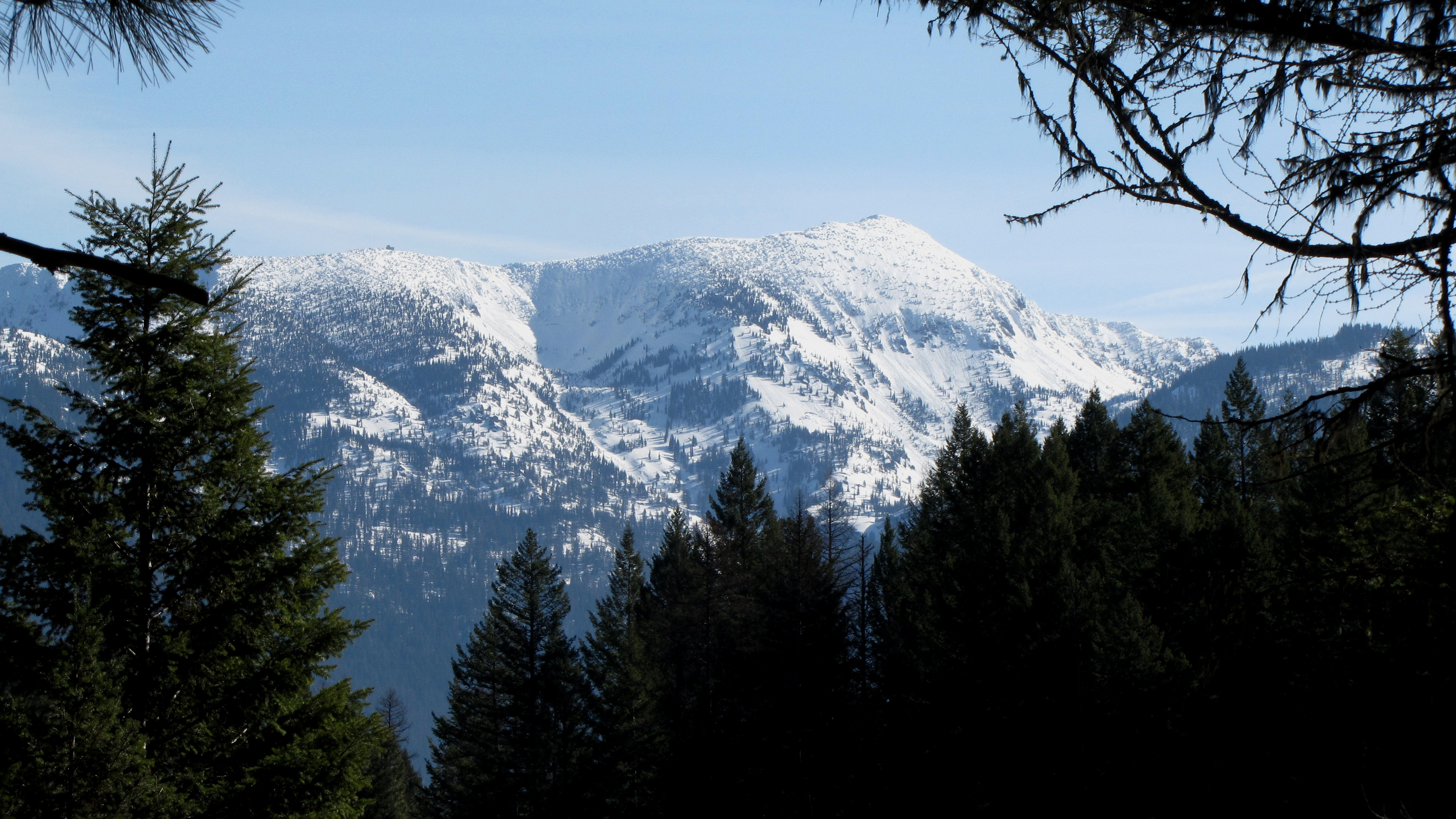
- West aspect

Highest point
- Elevation: 7,510 ft (2,290 m)
- Prominence: 1,608 ft (490 m)
- Parent peak: Big Hawk Mountain (7,542 ft)
- Isolation: 4.93 mi (7.93 km)
- Coordinates: 48°08′54″N 113°55′10″W

Geography
- Location within Montana Location within the United States
- Location: Flathead County, Montana, U.S.
- Parent range: Rocky Mountains; Swan Range
- Topo map: USGS Jewel Basin

Mount Aeneas is a summit in the U.S. state of Montana. The elevation is 7,510 feet (2,290 m). It is situated 23 miles east of Kalispell in the Jewel Basin area of Flathead National Forest.

Mount Aeneas was named after a Flathead chieftain.

== Climate ==
Based on the Köppen climate classification, the peak is located in a subarctic climate zone characterized by long, usually very cold winters, and mild summers. Winter temperatures can drop below −10 °F with wind chill factors below −30 °F.

== See also ==
- Geology of the Rocky Mountains

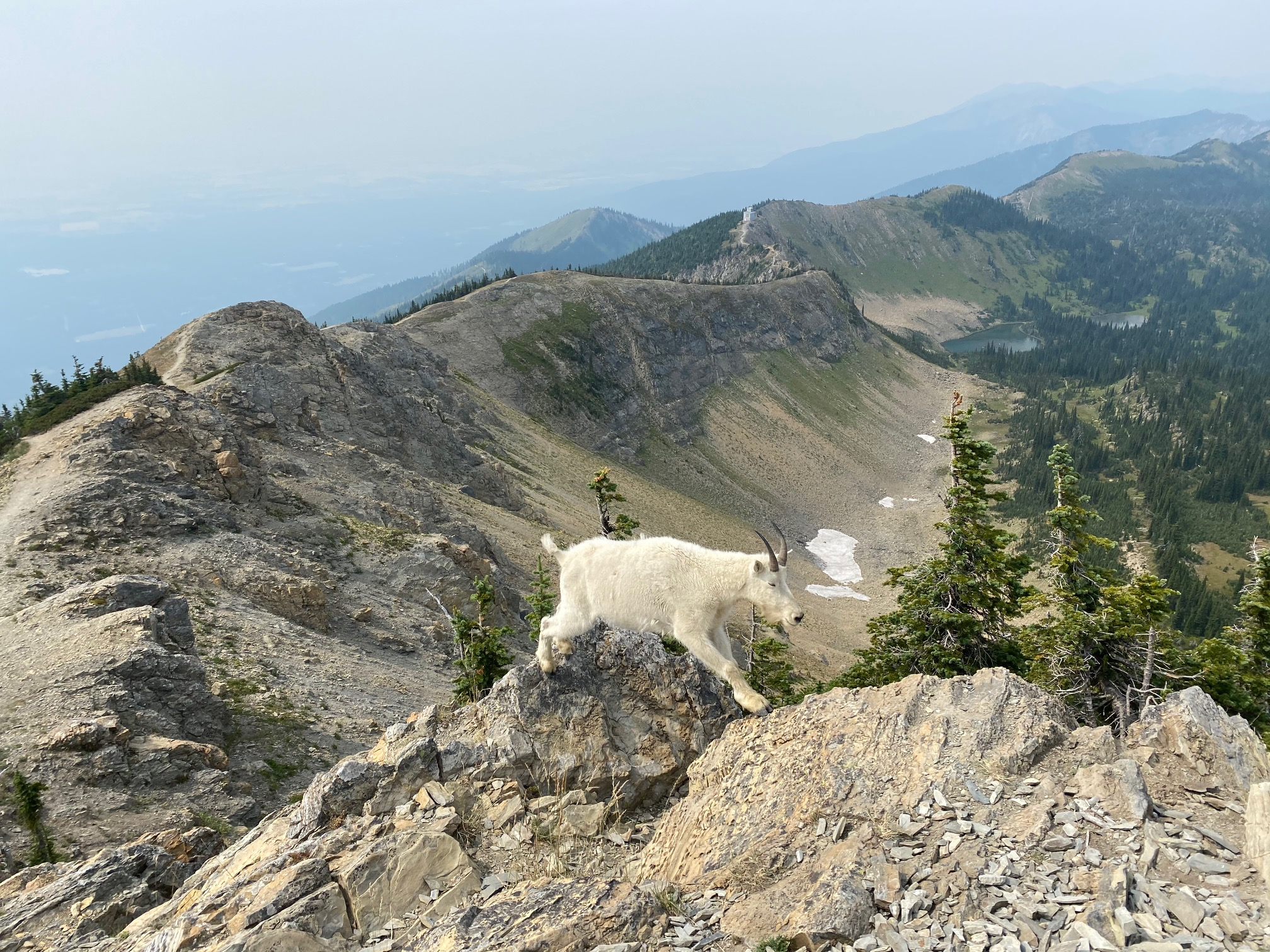
A mountain goat on top of Mount Aeneas
