= McPartland Mountain =

Mountain in Montana, United States

- East aspect

Highest point
- Elevation: 8,417 ft (2,566 m)
- Prominence: 333 ft (101 m)
- Coordinates: 48°41′26″N 113°51′49″W

Geography
- Location within Montana Location within the United States
- Location: Flathead County, Montana, U.S.
- Parent range: Livingston Range
- Topo map(s): USGS Mount Cannon, MT

McPartland Mountain (8,417 feet (2,566 m)) is located in the Livingston Range, Glacier National Park in the U.S. state of Montana. McPartland Mountain is a little more than a mile south of Heavens Peak. The mountain's name is believed to refer to Frank McPartland, of eastern Montana, who worked around nearby Lake McDonald for two seasons, and drowned in a boating accident on the lake in the 1890s.

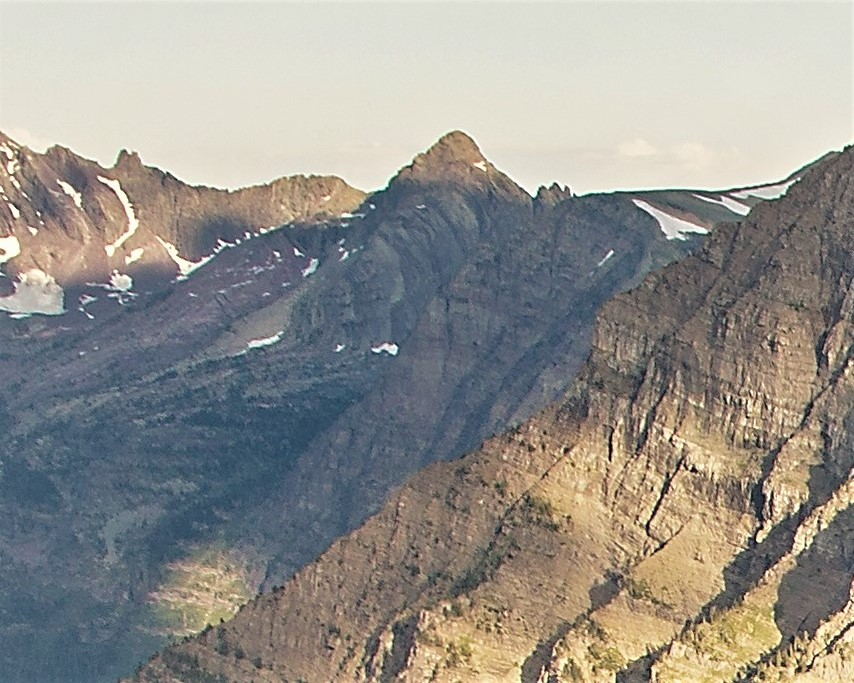
East aspect

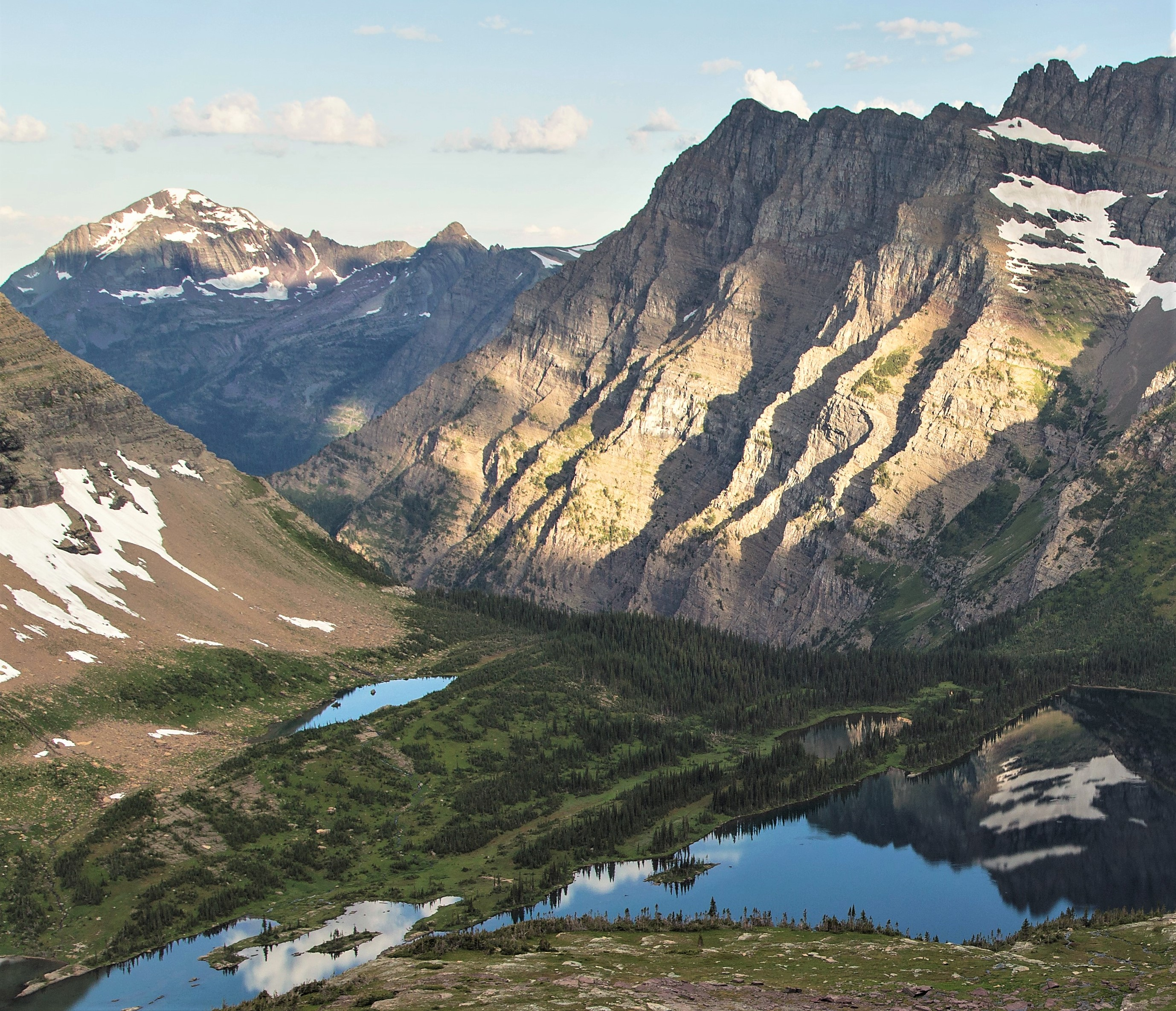
Mt. Vaught (left), Mt. Cannon (right), McPartland Mountain is the small knob between those two. Hidden Lake at bottom of frame.

== See also ==
- List of mountains and mountain ranges of Glacier National Park (U.S.)
