= Walton Mountain =

Mountain in the American state of Montana

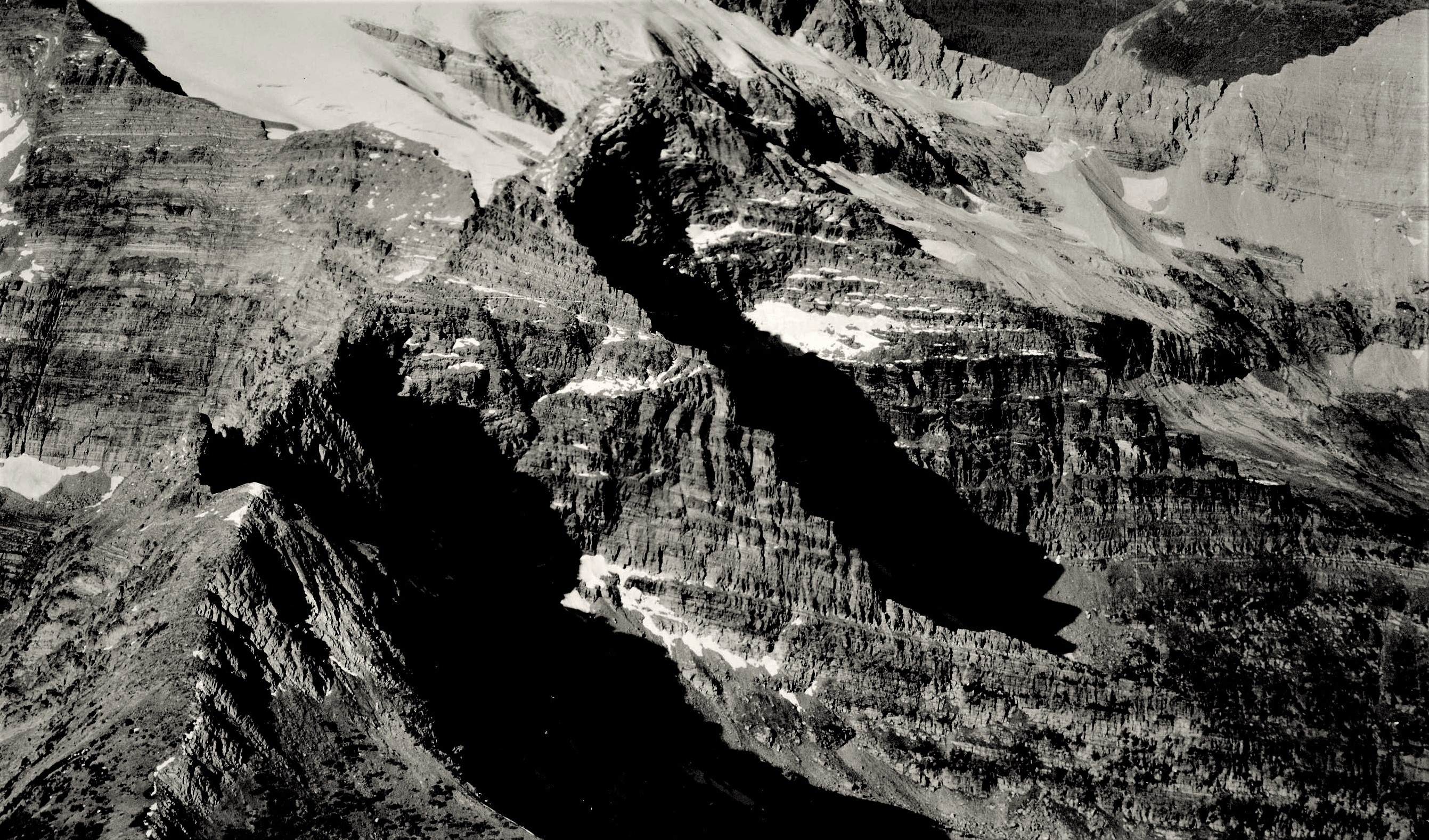
- Aerial view, south aspect

Highest point
- Elevation: 8,931 ft (2,722 m)
- Prominence: 766 ft (233 m)
- Coordinates: 48°34′32″N 113°43′58″W

Geography
- Location within Montana Location within the United States
- Location: Flathead County, Montana, U.S.
- Parent range: Lewis Range
- Topo map(s): USGS Mount Jackson, MT

Climbing
- First ascent: 1974 (Jensen, Lorenz, Shreve, Allen Smith)

Walton Mountain (8,931 feet (2,722 m)) is in the Lewis Range, Glacier National Park in the U.S. state of Montana. Two unnamed hanging glaciers are located to the east and northeast of the summit. Mount Jackson is 1.8 miles (2.9 km) to the north-northeast.

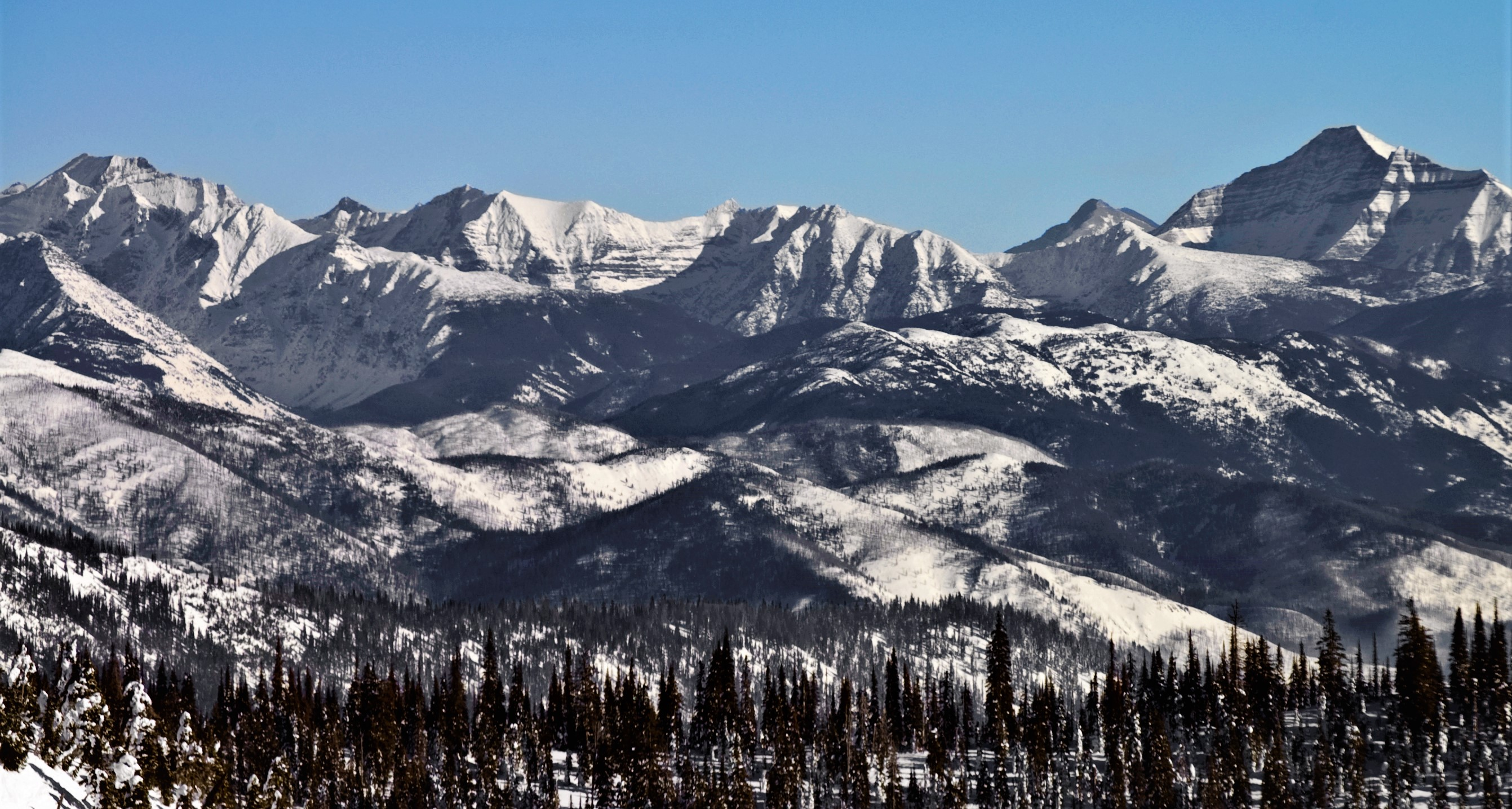
From the west, Walton at left edge of frame, Stimson at far right

== See also ==
- Mountains and mountain ranges of Glacier National Park (U.S.)
