= Slippery Bill Mountain =

Mountain in the state of Montana

Coordinates: 48°11′26″N 113°15′58″W

Slippery Bill Mountain is a summit in Flathead County, Montana, in the United States. With an elevation of 7,421 feet (2,262 m), Slippery Bill Mountain is the 1241st highest summit in the state of Montana.

Slippery Bill Mountain was named after William H. Morrison, a pioneer trapper.
