= Stanton Mountain =

Mountain summit in the Livingston Range

- SSE aspect of Stanton Mountain over Lake McDonald. Mount Vaught on the right.

Highest point
- Elevation: 7,750 ft (2,360 m)
- Prominence: 630 ft (190 m)
- Parent peak: Mount Vaught (8,854 ft)
- Isolation: 1.66 mi (2.67 km)
- Coordinates: 48°39′36″N 113°53′39″W

Naming
- Etymology: Lottie Stanton

Geography
- Location within Montana Location within the United States
- Location: Flathead County, Montana, U.S.
- Parent range: Livingston Range
- Topo map: USGS Camas Ridge East

Climbing
- Easiest route: class 4 scrambling

Stanton Mountain is a 7,750 feet (2,360 m) mountain summit located in the Livingston Range, of Glacier National Park in the U.S. state of Montana. Stanton Mountain rises more than 4,500 feet (1,400 m) above the northern shore of Lake McDonald. The mountain's name refers to Mrs. Lottie Stanton who lived near the west side of the park in the late 1800s, and with her husband operated a livery stable in historic Demersville. She was a pioneering woman who followed the construction camps during the railroad building days. The mountain's name was officially adopted in 1929. In the late 1800s it was known as Mt. Lottie Stanton. The nearest higher peak is Mount Vaught, 1.38 miles (2.22 km) to the northeast. Precipitation runoff from the mountain drains into tributaries of the Flathead River.

== Climate ==
Based on the Köppen climate classification, Stanton Mountain is located in a subarctic climate zone characterized by long, usually very cold winters, and short, cool to mild summers. Temperatures can drop below −10 °F with wind chill factors below −30 °F.

== Geology ==
Like other mountains in Glacier National Park, Stanton Mountain is composed of sedimentary rock laid down during the Precambrian to Jurassic periods. Formed in shallow seas, this sedimentary rock was initially uplifted beginning 170 million years ago when the Lewis Overthrust fault pushed an enormous slab of precambrian rocks 3 mi (4.8 km) thick, 50 miles (80 km) wide and 160 miles (260 km) long over younger rock of the cretaceous period.

== Gallery ==
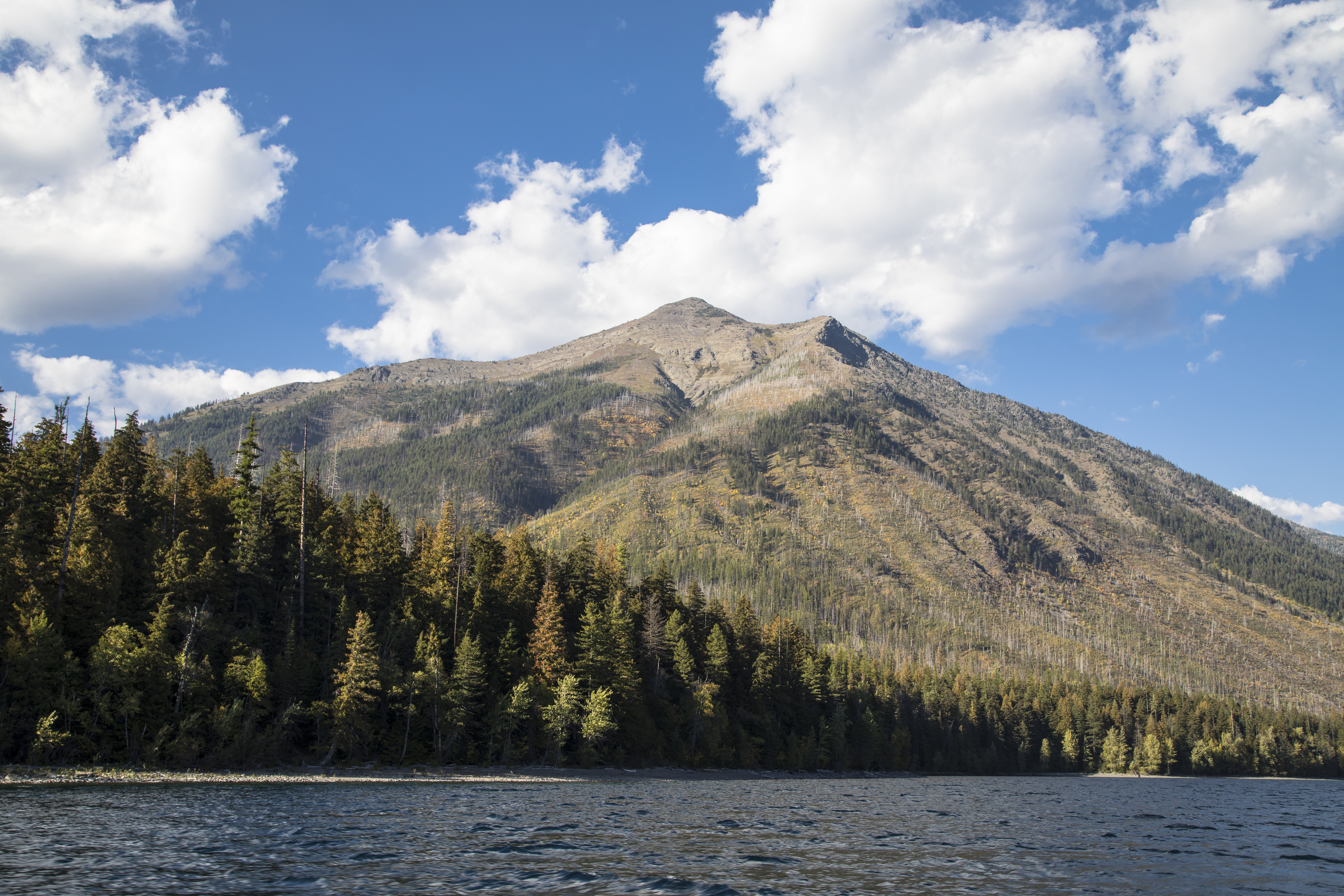
Due south aspect

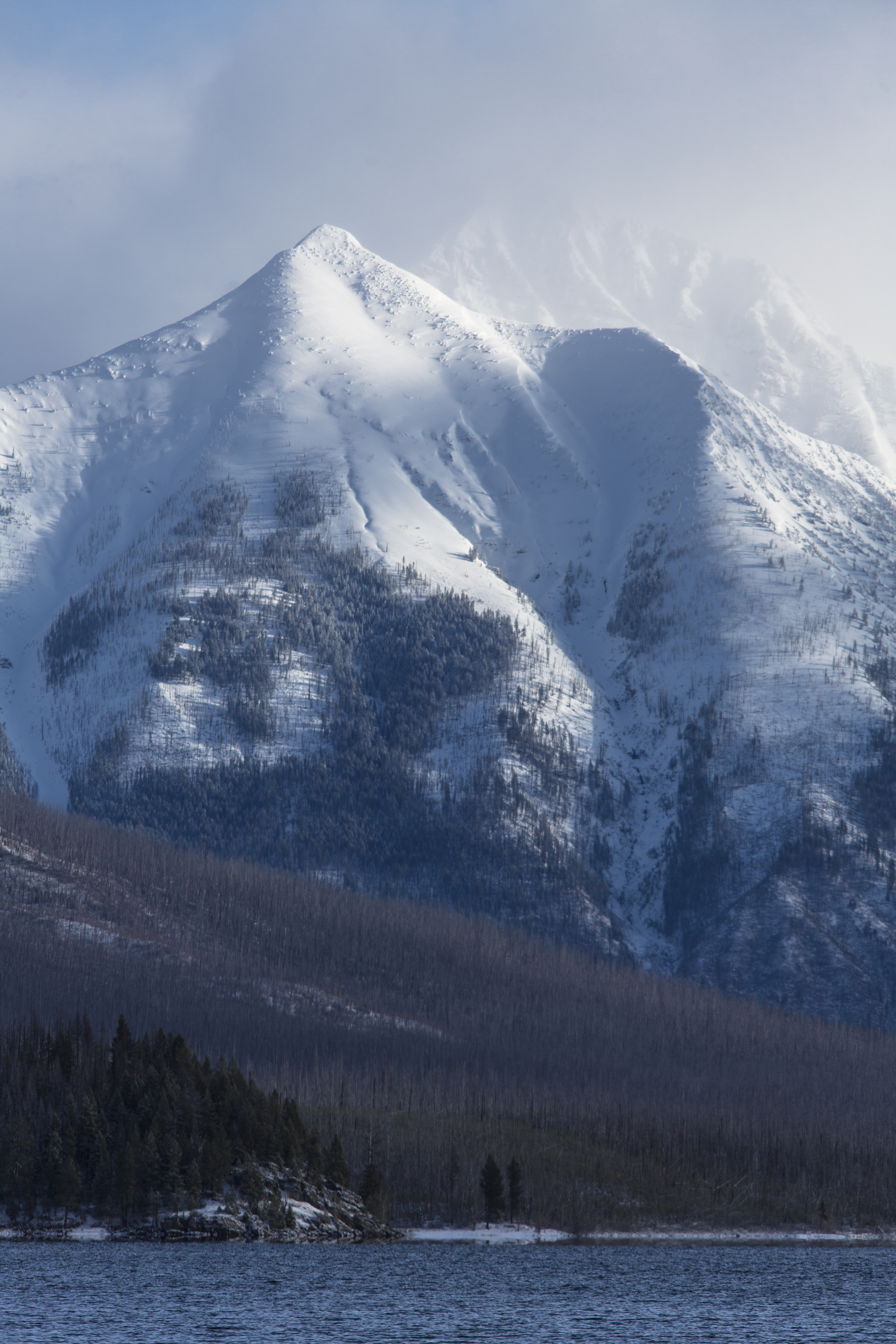
SSW aspect

Stanton Mountain (left) and Mount Vaught (right) and McDonald Creek

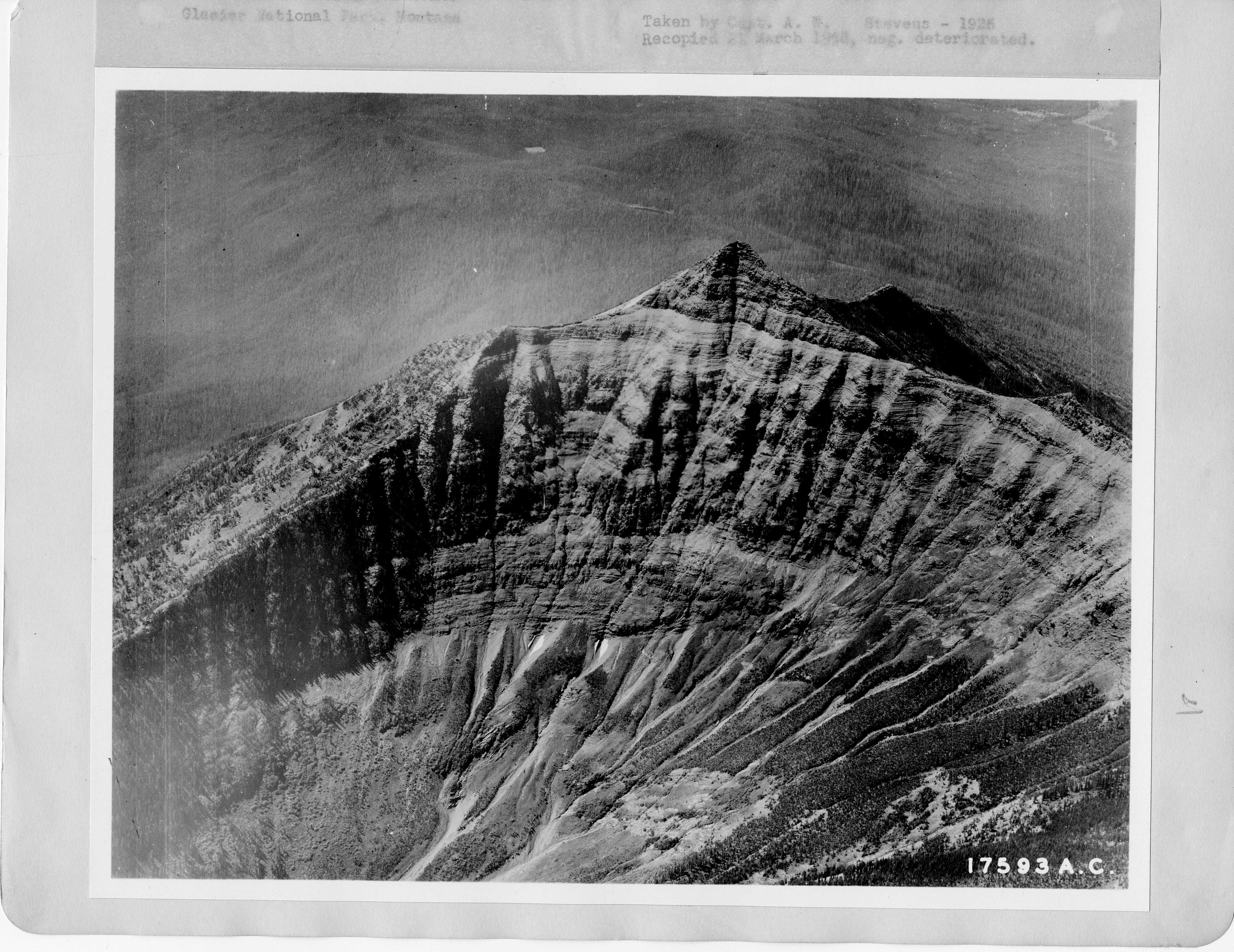
Aerial view of northeast aspect, circa 1925

== See also ==
- List of mountains and mountain ranges of Glacier National Park (U.S.)
- Geology of the Rocky Mountains
