= Mount Baptiste =

Mountain in the state of Montana

Coordinates: 48°7′40″N 113°38′4″W

Mount Baptiste is a summit in the U.S. state of Montana. The elevation is 8,379 feet (2,554 m).

Mount Baptiste was named after Felix Baptiste, a pioneer trapper.
