= Mount Pinchot (Montana) =

Mountain in the American state of Montana

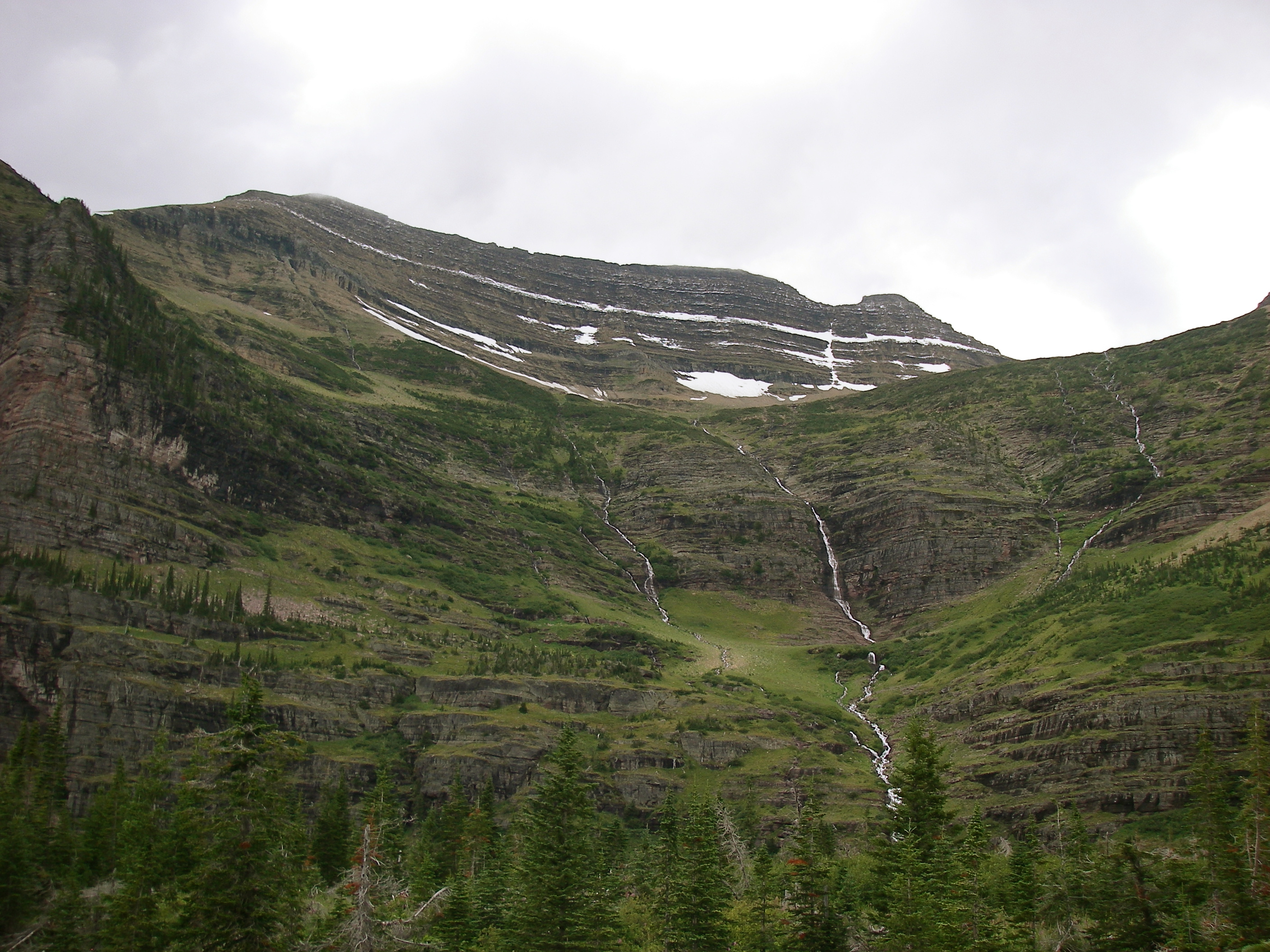
- Stream cascades down the face of Mount Pinchot

Highest point
- Elevation: 9,315 ft (2,839 m)
- Prominence: 1,870 ft (570 m)
- Coordinates: 48°29′44″N 113°35′42″W

Geography
- Location within Montana Location within the United States
- Location: Flathead County, Montana, U.S.
- Parent range: Lewis Range
- Topo map(s): USGS Mount Saint Nicholas, MT

Mount Pinchot (9,315 feet (2,839 m)) is located in the Lewis Range, Glacier National Park in the U.S. state of Montana. Mount Pinchot is less than 1.5 miles (2.4 km) SSE of Mount Stimson while Beaver Woman Lake is southeast of Mount Pinchot.

Mount Pinchot is named for Gifford Pinchot, pioneering forester and past Chief of United States Forest Service, which he helped organize. The name, Mount Pinchot, was officially approved by the United States Geographic Board on March 6, 1929.

== See also ==
- Mountains and mountain ranges of Glacier National Park (U.S.)
- Beaver Woman Lake
- Buffalo Woman Lake

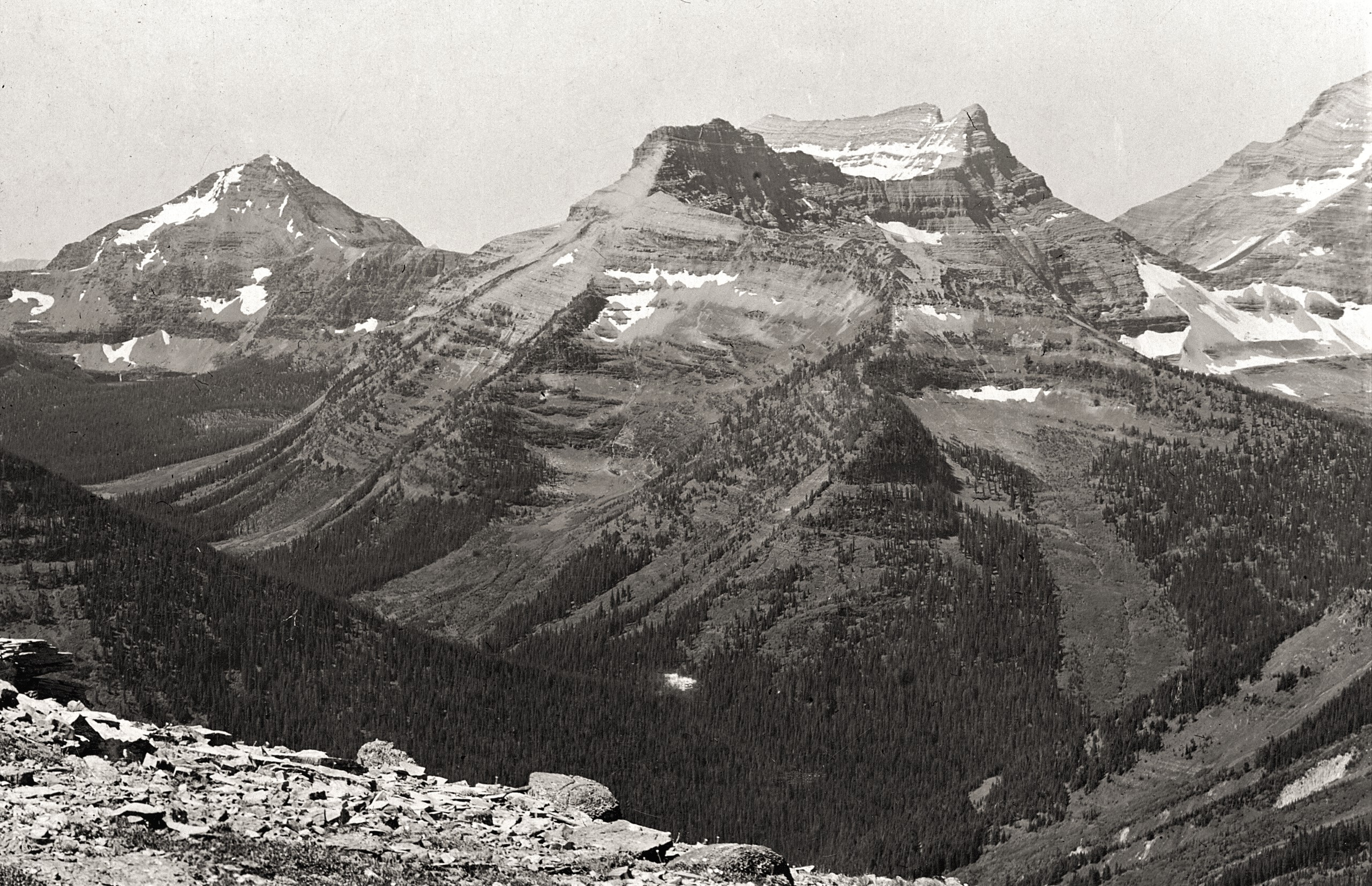
East aspect of Pinchot, with Eaglehead Mountain (left)
