= Mount Furlong =

Mountain in the state of Montana

Coordinates: 48°13′16″N 113°30′57″W

Mount Furlong is a summit in the U.S. state of Montana. The elevation is 7,388 feet (2,252 m).

Mount Furlong was named after James Furlong, a trapper and afterward railroad employee.
