= Mount Stimson =

Mountain in the American state of Montana

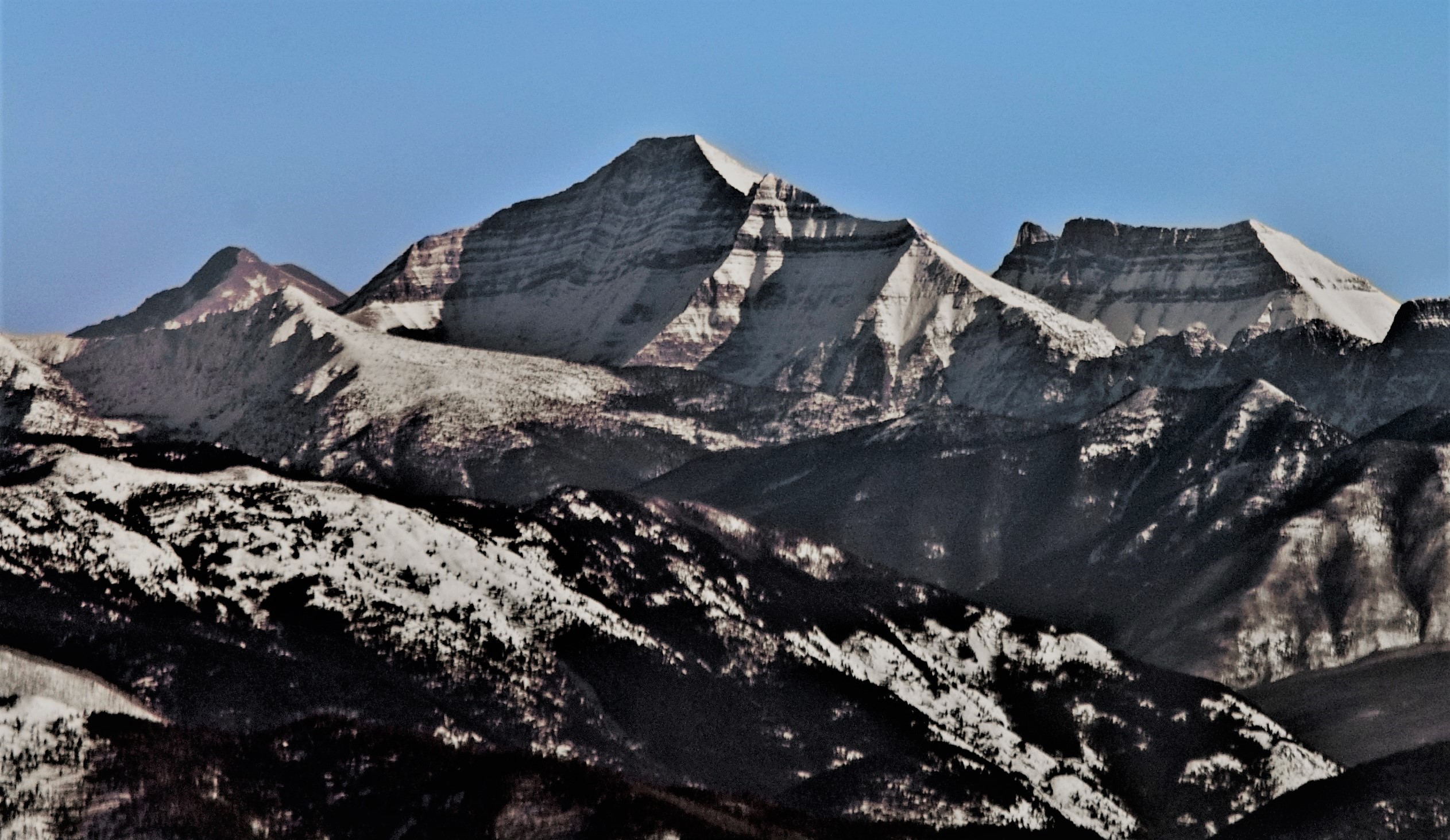
- Mount Stimson's west aspect, centered (Mount Pinchot to right)

Highest point
- Elevation: 10,147 ft (3,093 m)
- Prominence: 4,382 ft (1,336 m)
- Coordinates: 48°30′51″N 113°36′37″W

Geography
- Location within Montana Location within the United States
- Location: Flathead County, Montana, U.S.
- Parent range: Lewis Range
- Topo map: USGS Mount Stimson

Climbing
- First ascent: J. Gordon Edwards and Alice Edwards (1951) and likely earlier
- Easiest route: Hike/scramble (Class 3/4)

Mount Stimson (10,147 feet (3,093 m)) is the second highest peak in Glacier National Park, located in Montana, United States. It is part of the Lewis Range, which spans much of the park. It is located in the remote southwestern portion of the park, approximately 5 miles (8.0 km) west of the Continental Divide and 12 miles (19 km) southeast of Lake McDonald. It is drained by Pinchot Creek (on the south) and Nyack Creek (on the other sides), both of which flow into the Middle Fork of the Flathead River. The mountain is named for Henry L. Stimson (1867–1950), former U.S. Secretary of State and twice Secretary of War, who hiked and assisted George Bird Grinnell survey the area in and around Glacier National Park in the 1890s, and supported efforts to establish the national park.

== Notability ==
Mount Stimson is notable for its large, steep rise above local terrain. For example, its northwest face rises over 6,200 feet (1,900 m) from Nyack Creek in only 1.8 miles (2.9 km). This makes it "truly a monster of a mountain." It is also notable for its isolation; it is one of the farthest peaks from a roadhead in the park.

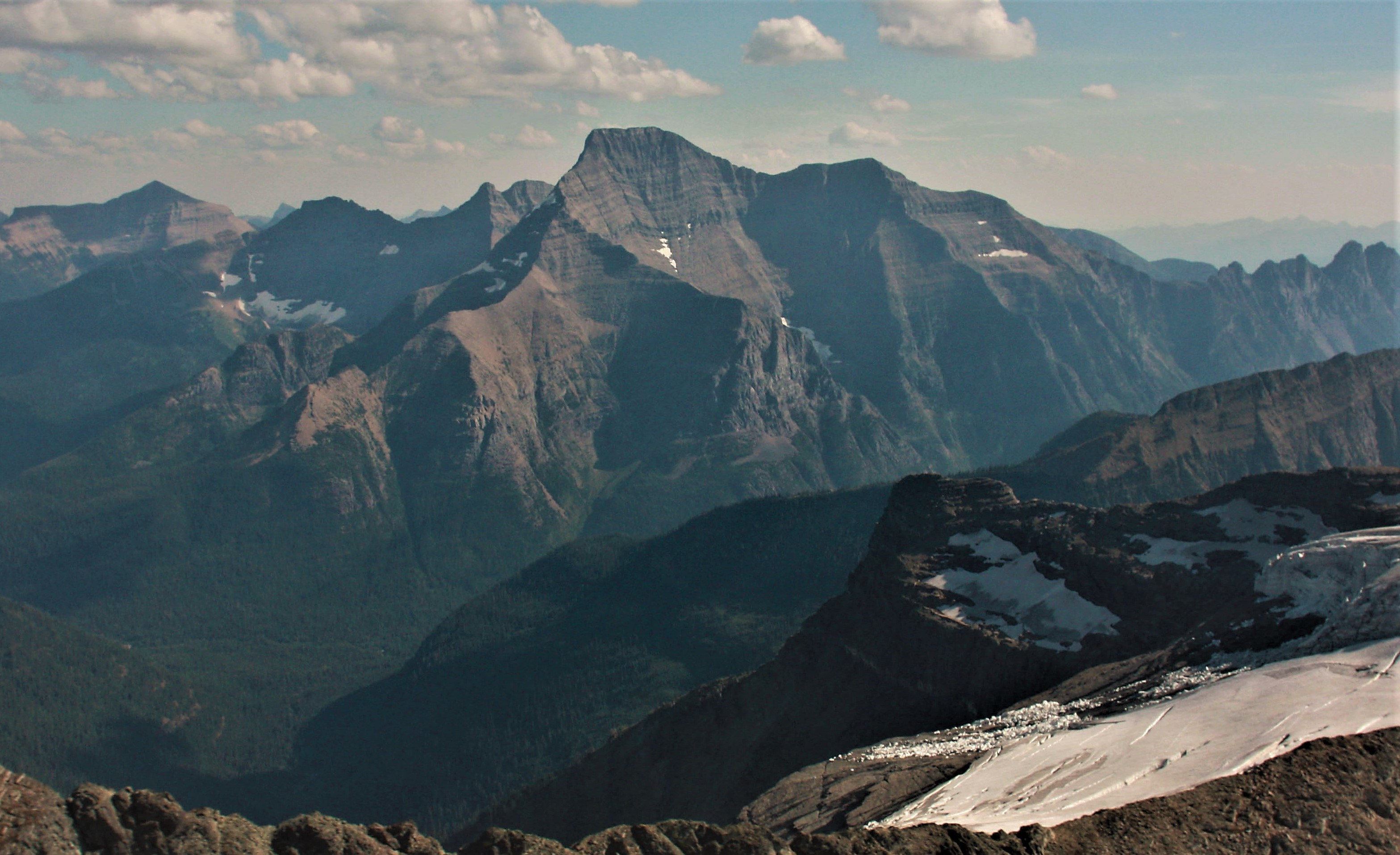
Aerial view of Mount Stimson's north aspect

== Climate ==
Climate data for Mount Stimson 48.5156 N, 113.6078 W, Elevation: 9,098 ft (2,773 m) (1991–2020 normals)
Month	Jan	Feb	Mar	Apr	May	Jun	Jul	Aug	Sep	Oct	Nov	Dec	Year
Mean daily maximum °F (°C)	22.6 (−5.2)	22.2 (−5.4)	26.1 (−3.3)	31.1 (−0.5)	40.5 (4.7)	48.5 (9.2)	59.5 (15.3)	60.0 (15.6)	51.7 (10.9)	38.4 (3.6)	26.4 (−3.1)	21.3 (−5.9)	37.4 (3.0)
Daily mean °F (°C)	16.1 (−8.8)	14.4 (−9.8)	17.2 (−8.2)	21.6 (−5.8)	30.2 (−1.0)	37.4 (3.0)	46.7 (8.2)	47.3 (8.5)	39.4 (4.1)	28.9 (−1.7)	20.1 (−6.6)	15.2 (−9.3)	27.9 (−2.3)
Mean daily minimum °F (°C)	9.6 (−12.4)	6.6 (−14.1)	8.3 (−13.2)	12.1 (−11.1)	19.9 (−6.7)	26.3 (−3.2)	33.9 (1.1)	34.7 (1.5)	27.1 (−2.7)	19.5 (−6.9)	13.7 (−10.2)	9.0 (−12.8)	18.4 (−7.6)
Average precipitation inches (mm)	9.71 (247)	8.34 (212)	8.67 (220)	7.20 (183)	7.18 (182)	8.21 (209)	2.83 (72)	2.99 (76)	4.72 (120)	6.98 (177)	10.45 (265)	9.92 (252)	87.2 (2,215)
Source: PRISM Climate Group

== History ==
The first recorded ascent of Mount Stimson was in 1951, by J. Gordon Edwards and Alice Edwards; however they found clear evidence of a previous ascent. The standard route of ascent is the West or Northwest Face Route, starting from Nyack Creek. A backpacking trail runs along Nyack Creek, providing access; however the National Park Service warns that this is a more brushy and isolated trail than in other areas of the park, with numerous unbridged stream crossings. As in the rest of the park, grizzly bears are an issue as well. The climbing route begins with "tiresome uphill bushwhacking...for possibly three hours" leading to alternating slopes and cliffs (Grades 3 and 4). Other routes on the peak include the Southeast Spur from Martha's Basin and the Pinchot Creek Route from the south.

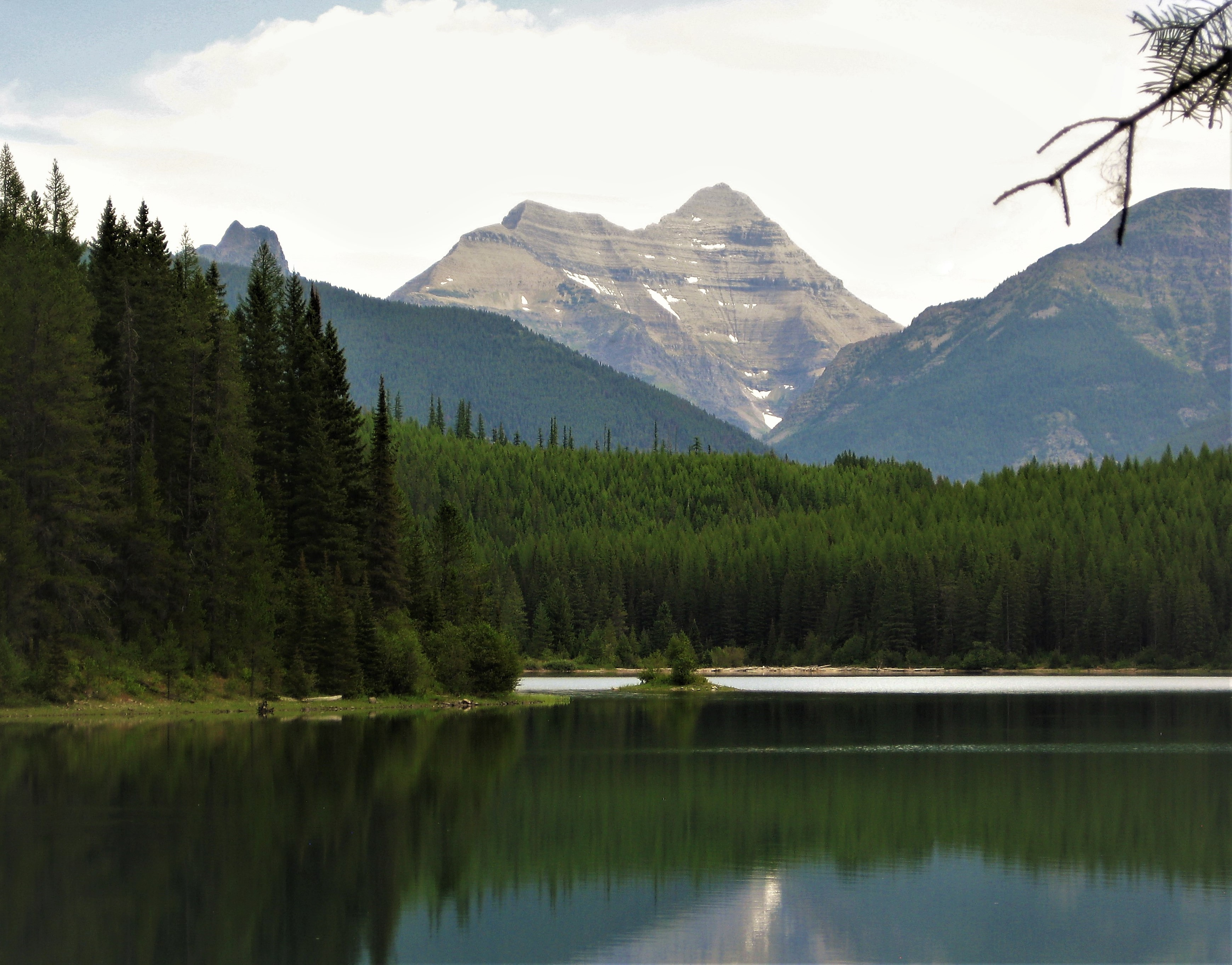
Mount Stimson, southwest aspect, from Stanton Lake

== See also ==
- Mountains and mountain ranges of Glacier National Park (U.S.)
