= Rampage Mountain =

Mountain in Montana, United States

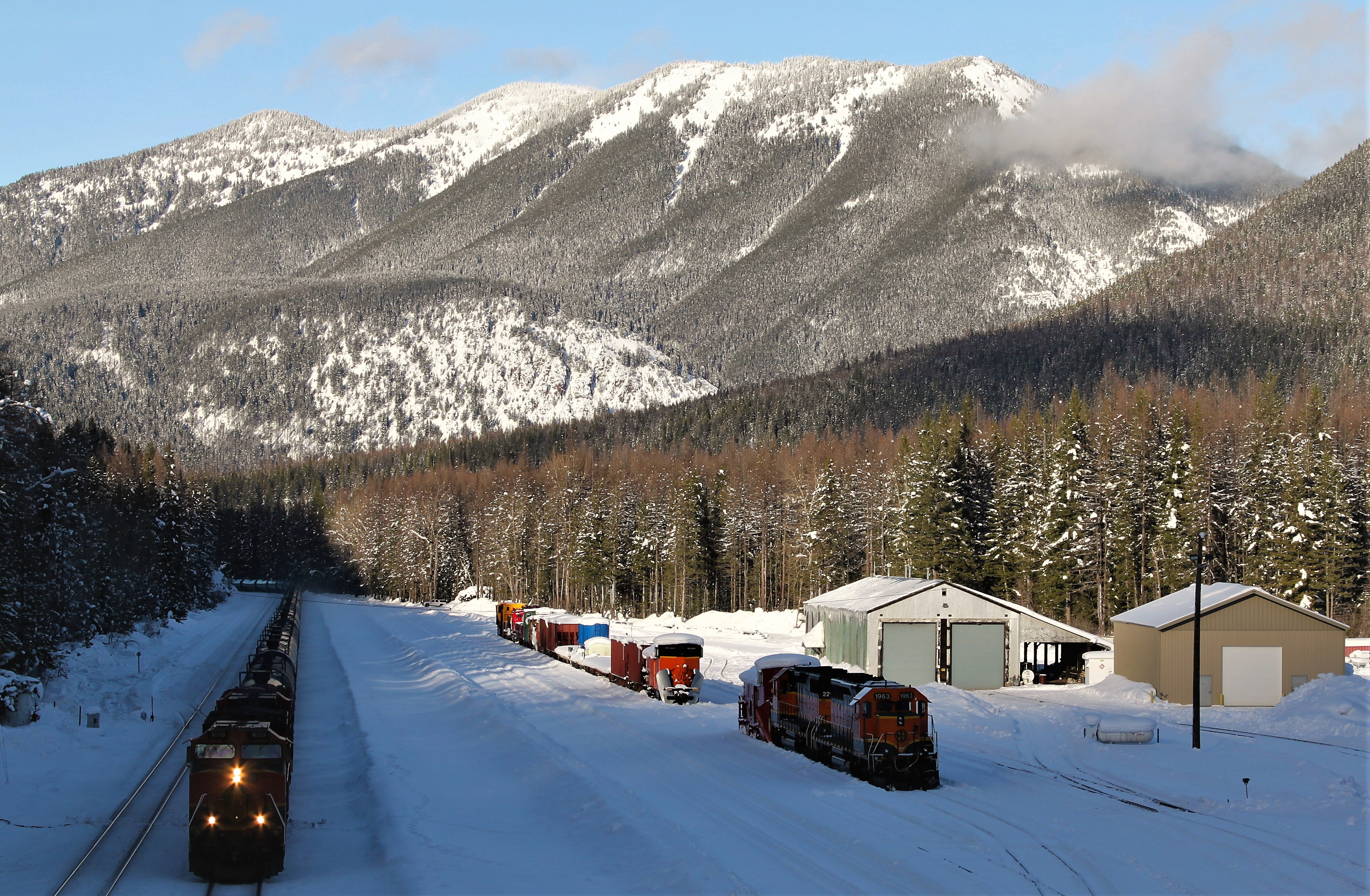
- South aspect, from Essex

Highest point
- Elevation: 6,855 ft (2,089 m)
- Prominence: 1,655 ft (504 m)
- Parent peak: Church Butte (8,816 ft)
- Isolation: 2.94 mi (4.73 km)
- Coordinates: 48°20′45″N 113°35′18″W

Geography
- Location within Montana Location within the United States
- Location: Glacier National Park; Flathead County, Montana, U.S.
- Parent range: Lewis Range; Rocky Mountains
- Topo map: USGS Essex

Rampage Mountain is a summit in Flathead County, Montana, in the United States. With an elevation of 6,855 feet (2,089 m), Rampage Mountain is the 1675th highest summit in the state of Montana. It is situated within Glacier National Park.

== Climate ==
According to the Köppen climate classification system, Rampage Mountain is located in an alpine subarctic climate zone with long, cold, snowy winters, and cool to warm summers. Winter temperatures can drop below −10 °F with wind chill factors below −30 °F. Due to its altitude, it receives precipitation all year, as snow in winter, and as thunderstorms in summer. Precipitation runoff from the mountain drains into tributaries of Middle Fork Flathead River. This climate supports a Lodgepole pine forest on its lower slopes.

== See also ==
- Mountains and mountain ranges of Glacier National Park (U.S.)
- Geology of the Rocky Mountains
