= Mount Saint Nicholas =

Mountain in Montana, United States

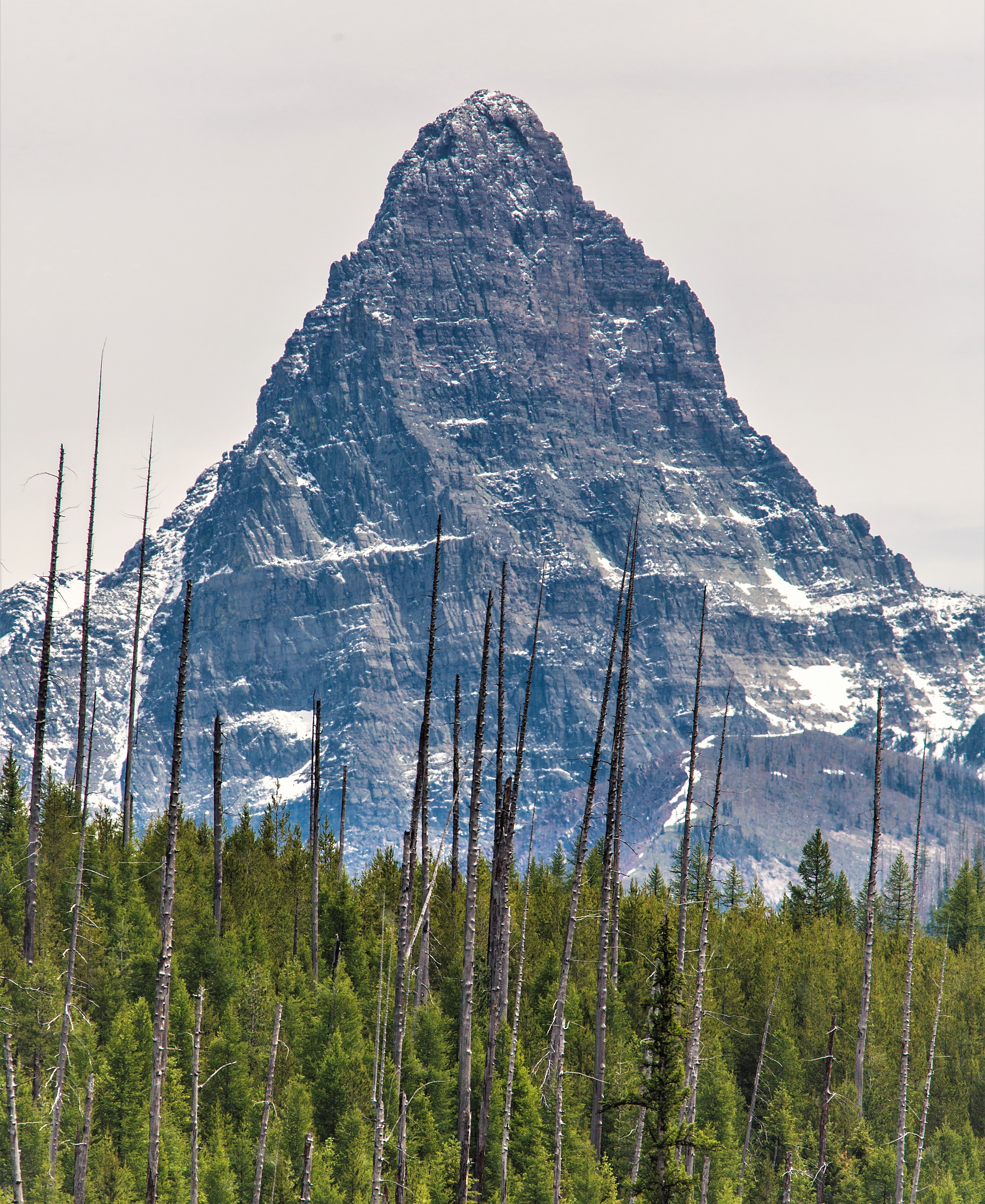

Highest point
- Elevation: 9,381 ft (2,859 m) NAVD 88
- Prominence: 2,456 ft (749 m)
- Coordinates: 48°23′30″N 113°33′01″W

Geography
- Location within Montana Location within the United States
- Location: Glacier National Park; Flathead County, Montana, U.S.
- Parent range: Lewis Range
- Topo map: USGS Mount Saint Nicholas

Climbing
- First ascent: 1926 by Conrad Wellen
- Easiest route: Northeast Ridge: technical rock climb

Mount Saint Nicholas is a peak in the remote southwestern section of Glacier National Park, in Montana. It is a particularly steep, pointed rock pinnacle, and its distinctive profile is visible from many summits in the southern half of the park. Because even its easiest ascent route is technical, with poor rock quality, it is "considered the most dangerous and difficult mountain for climbers in Glacier National Park."

Mount Saint Nicholas excels in terms of steep vertical relief, even by the high standards prevalent in Glacier National Park. For example, its northwest face rises one vertical mile (5,300 ft; 1,600 m) in approximately 1.5 horizontal miles (7,900 ft; 2.4 km). Due to its pointed shape and isolation from the Continental Divide, it has similarly precipitous drops in all directions.

In 1926, Reverend Conrad Wellen of Havre, Montana made the first ascent of Mount Saint Nicholas. The mountain had previously been considered by many to be unclimbable. The standard route is the Northeast Ridge. Starting from the east side of the peak, this route begins with a straightforward scramble up a gully to a prominent notch. From the notch a thousand vertical feet of somewhat technical climbing remain.

== Geology ==
Like other mountains in Glacier National Park, the peak is composed of sedimentary rock laid down during the Precambrian to Jurassic periods. Formed in shallow seas, this sedimentary rock was initially uplifted beginning 170 million years ago when the Lewis Overthrust fault pushed an enormous slab of precambrian rocks 3 mi (4.8 km) thick, 50 miles (80 km) wide and 160 miles (260 km) long over younger rock of the cretaceous period.

== Climate ==
Based on the Köppen climate classification, the peak is located in an alpine subarctic climate zone with long, cold, snowy winters, and cool to warm summers. Temperatures can drop below −10 °F with wind chill factors below −30 °F.

== See also ==
- List of mountains and mountain ranges of Glacier National Park
