= List of mountains in Flathead County, Montana (A-L) =

There are at least 314 named mountains in Flathead County, Montana.

- Adams Mountain, 48°30′26″N 114°40′57″W, el. 5,371 feet (1,637 m)
- Ahern Peak, 48°49′51″N 113°46′56″W, el. 8,753 feet (2,668 m)
- Akinkoka Peak, 48°50′32″N 114°30′59″W, el. 7,014 feet (2,138 m)
- Alcove Mountain, 47°47′07″N 113°37′18″W, el. 7,959 feet (2,426 m)
- Amphitheatre Mountain, 47°38′39″N 113°10′35″W, el. 8,110 feet (2,470 m)
- Anaconda Peak, 48°46′06″N 113°58′24″W, el. 8,166 feet (2,489 m)
- Angel Hill, 47°59′15″N 114°10′27″W, el. 3,094 feet (943 m)
- Antice Knob, 48°38′02″N 114°32′59″W, el. 4,737 feet (1,444 m)
- Argosy Mountain, 48°00′14″N 113°14′22″W, el. 8,048 feet (2,453 m)
- Arrowhead Mountain, 48°06′27″N 113°11′01″W, el. 6,798 feet (2,072 m)
- Ashley Mountain, 48°16′53″N 114°42′44″W, el. 6,293 feet (1,918 m)
- Bald Mountain, 48°11′42″N 114°28′33″W, el. 4,245 feet (1,294 m)
- Bald Mountain, 48°55′55″N 114°43′05″W, el. 6,991 feet (2,131 m)
- Bald Rock, 48°15′44″N 114°28′02″W, el. 4,012 feet (1,223 m)
- Baldhead Mountain, 48°13′52″N 113°22′22″W, el. 7,789 feet (2,374 m)
- Baldy Mountain, 48°01′30″N 114°17′18″W, el. 4,954 feet (1,510 m)
- Bar Z Peak, 47°59′48″N 114°55′40″W, el. 6,293 feet (1,918 m)
- Barrier Buttes, 48°22′50″N 113°24′59″W, el. 7,405 feet (2,257 m)
- Battery Mountain, 48°03′16″N 113°44′56″W, el. 6,886 feet (2,099 m)
- Battlement Mountain, 48°24′53″N 113°31′05″W, el. 8,832 feet (2,692 m)
- Beacon Mountain, 47°59′30″N 113°32′18″W, el. 5,312 feet (1,619 m)
- Bear Peak, 48°06′58″N 113°04′14″W, el. 6,913 feet (2,107 m)
- Bearhat Mountain, 48°40′01″N 113°45′49″W, el. 8,674 feet (2,644 m)
- Beaver Hill, 47°54′37″N 113°23′08″W, el. 6,010 feet (1,830 m)
- Belton Hills, 48°31′22″N 113°55′46″W, el. 6,253 feet (1,906 m)
- Belton Point, 48°26′00″N 113°57′55″W, el. 6,371 feet (1,942 m)
- Bent Mountain, 47°59′02″N 113°24′24″W, el. 7,129 feet (2,173 m)
- Big Bill Mountain, 47°56′39″N 113°22′27″W, el. 6,588 feet (2,008 m)
- Big Hawk Mountain, 48°05′32″N 113°51′12″W, el. 7,470 feet (2,280 m)
- Big Lodge Mountain, 48°09′52″N 113°12′30″W, el. 7,602 feet (2,317 m)
- Big Mountain, 48°30′23″N 114°20′53″W, el. 6,818 feet (2,078 m)
- Bighorn Mountain, 48°01′52″N 112°56′47″W, el. 8,107 feet (2,471 m)
- Bighorn Peak, 48°51′15″N 114°01′02″W, el. 7,162 feet (2,183 m)
- Black Bear Hump, 47°46′36″N 113°22′59″W, el. 6,240 feet (1,900 m)
- Black Bear Mountain, 47°46′45″N 113°20′46″W, el. 7,641 feet (2,329 m)
- Blackfoot Mountain, 48°34′55″N 113°40′06″W, el. 9,544 feet (2,909 m)
- Blacktail Hills, 48°18′31″N 113°24′12″W, el. 6,017 feet (1,834 m)
- Blacktail Mountain, 48°00′39″N 114°21′50″W, el. 6,752 feet (2,058 m)
- Blaine Mountain, 48°16′34″N 114°05′18″W, el. 7,169 feet (2,185 m)
- Bold Peak, 47°55′23″N 114°49′41″W, el. 6,339 feet (1,932 m)
- Boorman Peak, 48°10′49″N 114°31′56″W, el. 5,420 feet (1,650 m)
- Boulder Peak, 48°57′20″N 114°05′28″W, el. 8,527 feet (2,599 m)
- Bow Mountain, 47°57′17″N 113°03′52″W, el. 7,818 feet (2,383 m)
- Bowl Mountain, 47°59′11″N 112°55′33″W, el. 8,150 feet (2,480 m)
- Brave Dog Mountain, 48°21′32″N 113°27′40″W, el. 8,468 feet (2,581 m)
- Broken Leg Mountain, 48°03′17″N 113°52′49″W, el. 7,362 feet (2,244 m)
- Brownie Point, 47°37′13″N 113°29′57″W, el. 8,235 feet (2,510 m)
- Bruce Mountain, 47°52′13″N 113°37′05″W, el. 7,634 feet (2,327 m)
- Bungalow Mountain, 47°47′06″N 113°09′21″W, el. 8,127 feet (2,477 m)
- Bunker Hill, 47°50′22″N 113°27′11″W, el. 5,876 feet (1,791 m)
- Canyon Point, 48°13′50″N 113°44′18″W, el. 6,296 feet (1,919 m)
- Cap Mountain, 48°06′42″N 113°02′54″W, el. 7,461 feet (2,274 m)
- Caper Peak, 48°26′02″N 113°29′54″W, el. 8,268 feet (2,520 m)
- Capitol Mountain, 48°02′47″N 113°18′57″W, el. 7,851 feet (2,393 m)
- Castle Rock, 47°58′03″N 114°50′06″W, el. 6,181 feet (1,884 m)
- Cathedral Peak, 47°49′26″N 113°18′57″W, el. 7,572 feet (2,308 m)
- Center Mountain, 48°51′12″N 114°26′13″W, el. 5,253 feet (1,601 m)
- Chair Mountain, 48°02′56″N 113°11′58″W, el. 7,070 feet (2,150 m)
- Chipmunk Peak, 47°51′15″N 113°32′40″W, el. 7,214 feet (2,199 m)
- Church Butte, 48°22′54″N 113°30′49″W, el. 8,816 feet (2,687 m)
- Cinabar Mountain, 47°52′15″N 113°32′39″W, el. 7,247 feet (2,209 m)
- Circus Peak, 48°05′37″N 113°36′36″W, el. 7,775 feet (2,370 m)
- Clack Mountain, 47°58′59″N 113°04′37″W, el. 7,572 feet (2,308 m)
- Cleft Rock Mountain, 48°54′46″N 114°31′53″W, el. 7,277 feet (2,218 m)
- Clements Mountain, 48°41′35″N 113°44′25″W, el. 8,671 feet (2,643 m)
- Cliff Mountain, 47°39′25″N 113°07′44″W, el. 8,566 feet (2,611 m)
- Cloudcroft Peaks, 48°26′02″N 113°34′08″W, el. 8,674 feet (2,644 m)
- Columbia Mountain, 48°20′48″N 114°05′53″W, el. 7,208 feet (2,197 m)
- Condor Peak, 48°00′56″N 113°26′30″W, el. 7,198 feet (2,194 m)
- Cone Peak, 47°38′59″N 113°16′43″W, el. 7,329 feet (2,234 m)
- Crater Mountain, 48°06′59″N 113°54′39″W, el. 6,762 feet (2,061 m)
- Crossover Mountain, 48°01′58″N 113°33′29″W, el. 6,608 feet (2,014 m)
- Cruiser Mountain, 48°00′00″N 113°08′25″W, el. 8,022 feet (2,445 m)
- Cyclone Peak, 48°43′28″N 114°18′55″W, el. 6,030 feet (1,840 m)
- Desert Mountain, 48°25′55″N 113°57′57″W, el. 6,368 feet (1,941 m)
- Devils Hump, 48°13′15″N 113°29′01″W, el. 7,618 feet (2,322 m)
- Diamond Peak, 48°41′08″N 114°32′32″W, el. 7,296 feet (2,224 m)
- Dog Mountain, 48°35′05″N 114°37′10″W, el. 3,655 feet (1,114 m)
- Doris Mountain, 48°18′14″N 114°04′39″W, el. 7,405 feet (2,257 m)
- Double Mountain, 48°24′01″N 113°39′11″W, el. 6,027 feet (1,837 m)
- Dry Park Mountain, 48°03′47″N 113°35′22″W, el. 7,198 feet (2,194 m)
- Dunsire Point, 48°24′16″N 114°48′47″W, el. 6,171 feet (1,881 m)
- Eagle Ribs Mountain, 48°24′22″N 113°25′02″W, el. 8,140 feet (2,480 m)
- Eaglehead Mountain, 48°28′25″N 113°36′19″W, el. 9,098 feet (2,773 m)
- Edwards Mountain, 48°37′22″N 113°47′10″W, el. 9,012 feet (2,747 m)
- Elk Mountain, 48°15′44″N 113°43′26″W, el. 7,385 feet (2,251 m)
- Elk Mountain, 48°18′24″N 113°26′40″W, el. 7,808 feet (2,380 m)
- Emery Hill, 48°23′41″N 113°55′58″W, el. 5,400 feet (1,600 m)
- Essex Mountain, 48°15′52″N 113°39′50″W, el. 6,975 feet (2,126 m)
- Felix Peak, 48°11′47″N 113°39′50″W, el. 7,989 feet (2,435 m)
- Firefighter Mountain, 48°19′58″N 113°52′40″W, el. 5,669 feet (1,728 m)
- Flattop Mountain, 48°48′07″N 113°52′00″W, el. 6,844 feet (2,086 m)
- Forks Lookout, 48°35′53″N 114°20′43″W, el. 6,506 feet (1,983 m)
- Forster Mountain, 48°11′36″N 113°29′30″W, el. 7,789 feet (2,374 m)
- Fox Mountain, 48°26′06″N 114°46′52″W, el. 6,174 feet (1,882 m)
- Gable Peaks, 48°02′25″N 113°10′32″W, el. 7,700 feet (2,300 m)
- Gardner Point, 48°58′38″N 114°07′38″W, el. 7,359 feet (2,243 m)
- Garnet Peak, 47°36′48″N 113°26′52″W, el. 8,140 feet (2,480 m)
- Gateway Points, 48°01′47″N 112°59′11″W, el. 6,863 feet (2,092 m)
- Gildart Peak, 47°50′27″N 113°39′59″W, el. 7,858 feet (2,395 m)
- Glacier View Mountain, 48°37′33″N 114°10′35″W, el. 6,092 feet (1,857 m)
- Gladiator Mountain, 47°37′51″N 113°09′31″W, el. 8,195 feet (2,498 m)
- Great Bear Mountain, 48°24′41″N 113°52′45″W, el. 7,579 feet (2,310 m)
- Great Northern Mountain, 48°20′09″N 113°46′37″W, el. 8,560 feet (2,610 m)
- Green Mountain, 47°58′15″N 113°22′47″W, el. 7,405 feet (2,257 m)
- Grizzly Mountain, 48°25′07″N 113°24′07″W, el. 9,039 feet (2,755 m)
- Grouse Mountain, 48°31′02″N 114°43′35″W, el. 5,686 feet (1,733 m)
- Grubb Mountain, 48°15′28″N 114°49′39″W, el. 5,453 feet (1,662 m)
- Gunsight Mountain, 48°37′09″N 113°45′12″W, el. 9,085 feet (2,769 m)
- Gunsight Peak, 47°58′34″N 113°19′38″W, el. 7,136 feet (2,175 m)
- Gunsight Rock, 47°58′27″N 113°20′11″W, el. 6,896 feet (2,102 m)
- Hash Mountain, 48°14′37″N 114°01′50″W, el. 7,077 feet (2,157 m)
- Haskill Mountain, 48°02′42″N 114°33′22″W, el. 6,263 feet (1,909 m)
- Haystack Butte, 48°43′59″N 113°43′56″W, el. 7,487 feet (2,282 m)
- Heavens Peak, 48°42′32″N 113°51′22″W, el. 8,848 feet (2,697 m)
- Helen Mountain, 47°43′20″N 113°15′30″W, el. 8,028 feet (2,447 m)
- Helmet Point, 48°05′16″N 113°18′10″W, el. 5,610 feet (1,710 m)
- Hematite Peak, 48°07′26″N 113°29′20″W, el. 7,165 feet (2,184 m)
- Hornet Mountain, 48°52′47″N 114°30′47″W, el. 6,742 feet (2,055 m)
- Horseshoe Peak, 48°04′33″N 113°25′01″W, el. 7,608 feet (2,319 m)
- Huckleberry Mountain, 48°36′02″N 114°08′04″W, el. 6,585 feet (2,007 m)
- Hungry Horse Mountain, 48°22′10″N 113°54′21″W, el. 5,600 feet (1,700 m)
- Huntsberger Peak, 48°48′25″N 114°39′40″W, el. 7,237 feet (2,206 m)
- Ibex Mountain, 47°48′47″N 113°12′57″W, el. 7,979 feet (2,432 m)
- Ingalls Mountain, 48°21′28″N 114°45′29″W, el. 6,129 feet (1,868 m)
- Inspiration Point, 47°46′37″N 113°39′09″W, el. 7,552 feet (2,302 m)
- Java Mountain, 48°12′41″N 113°35′24″W, el. 6,788 feet (2,069 m)
- Johnson Peak, 48°26′59″N 114°41′10″W, el. 6,010 feet (1,830 m)
- Kah Mountain, 48°00′25″N 113°40′35″W, el. 6,453 feet (1,967 m)
- Keith Mountain, 48°32′26″N 114°41′20″W, el. 5,292 feet (1,613 m)
- Kerr Mountain, 47°58′43″N 114°20′20″W, el. 6,099 feet (1,859 m)
- Ketowke Mountain, 48°35′25″N 114°43′47″W, el. 5,610 feet (1,710 m)
- Kinnerly Peak, 48°57′22″N 114°09′55″W, el. 9,947 feet (3,032 m)
- Kintla Peak, 48°56′38″N 114°10′16″W, el. 10,072 feet (3,070 m)
- Lake Mountain, 48°46′40″N 114°35′28″W, el. 7,802 feet (2,378 m)
- Larch Hill, 47°44′06″N 113°09′09″W, el. 8,153 feet (2,485 m)
- Limestone Peak, 47°52′36″N 113°14′43″W, el. 7,251 feet (2,210 m)
- Lincoln Peak, 48°35′49″N 113°47′00″W, el. 7,241 feet (2,207 m)
- Link Mountain, 48°45′36″N 114°34′32″W, el. 7,221 feet (2,201 m)
- Lion Hill, 48°21′24″N 114°00′51″W, el. 4,810 feet (1,470 m)
- Lion Mountain, 48°03′04″N 114°19′09″W, el. 5,692 feet (1,735 m)
- Lion Mountain, 48°25′15″N 114°23′53″W, el. 4,357 feet (1,328 m)
- Little Dog Mountain, 48°20′35″N 113°23′13″W, el. 8,573 feet (2,613 m)
- Little Matterhorn, 48°38′10″N 113°47′04″W, el. 7,611 feet (2,320 m)
- Lodgepole Mountain, 48°05′47″N 113°12′31″W, el. 7,188 feet (2,191 m)
- Logging Mountain, 48°48′21″N 114°02′49″W, el. 8,540 feet (2,600 m)
- Lone Butte, 47°43′58″N 113°13′37″W, el. 8,274 feet (2,522 m)
- Lone Walker Mountain, 48°27′12″N 113°28′44″W, el. 8,396 feet (2,559 m)
- Loneman Mountain, 48°29′21″N 113°46′10″W, el. 7,149 feet (2,179 m)
- Long Knife Peak, 48°59′50″N 114°12′28″W, el. 9,708 feet (2,959 m)
- Longfellow Peak, 48°44′44″N 113°56′21″W, el. 8,855 feet (2,699 m)

== See also ==
- List of mountains in Montana
- List of mountain ranges in Montana
