= Union Mountain =

Mountain in Montana, United States

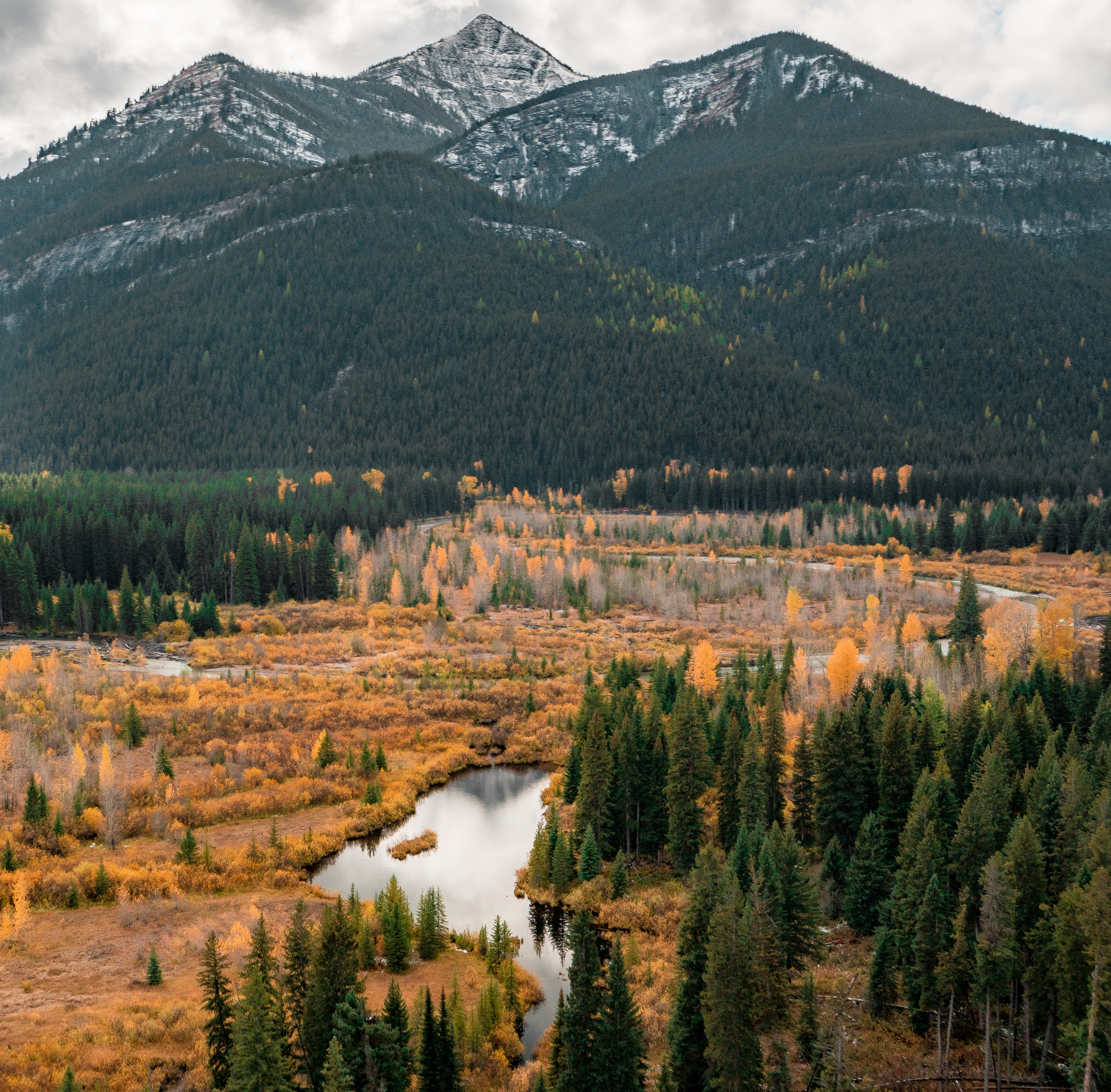
- Northeast aspect

Highest point
- Elevation: 7,601 ft (2,317 m)
- Prominence: 701 ft (214 m)
- Parent peak: Capitol Mountain (7,868 ft)
- Isolation: 1.87 mi (3.01 km)
- Coordinates: 48°03′20″N 113°16′42″W

Geography
- Location within Montana Location within the United States
- Location: Flathead County, Montana, U.S.
- Parent range: Rocky Mountains; Flathead Range
- Topo map: USGS Capitol Mountain

Geology
- Rock age: Precambrian
- Rock type: Sedimentary rock

Union Mountain is a 7,601-foot (2,317-metre) summit located in Flathead County of the U.S. state of Montana.

== Description ==
Union Mountain is located in the Flathead Range, a subset of the Rocky Mountains. It is situated in the Great Bear Wilderness, on land managed by Flathead National Forest. Schafer Meadows, Shafer Ranger Station, and the Schafer landing strip are set below the mountain's northeast base. The landing strip was grandfathered with the wilderness designation. The landing strip provides access for hikers, hunters, and river rafters. Precipitation runoff from the mountain drains north to the Middle Fork Flathead River, and topographic relief is significant as the summit rises 2,800 feet (850 meters) above the river in approximately 1.5 mile. The nearest higher neighbor is Capitol Mountain, 1.9 miles (3.1 km) to the west-southwest.

== Climate ==
Based on the Köppen climate classification, Union Mountain is located in a subarctic climate zone characterized by long, usually very cold winters, and short, cool to mild summers. Winter temperatures can drop below −10 °F with wind chill factors below −30 °F.

== Geology ==
Union Mountain is composed of sedimentary rock laid down during the Precambrian to Jurassic periods. Formed in shallow seas, this sedimentary rock was initially uplifted beginning 170 million years ago when the Lewis Overthrust fault pushed an enormous slab of precambrian rocks 3 mi (4.8 km) thick, 50 miles (80 km) wide and 160 miles (260 km) long over younger rock of the cretaceous period.

== Gallery ==
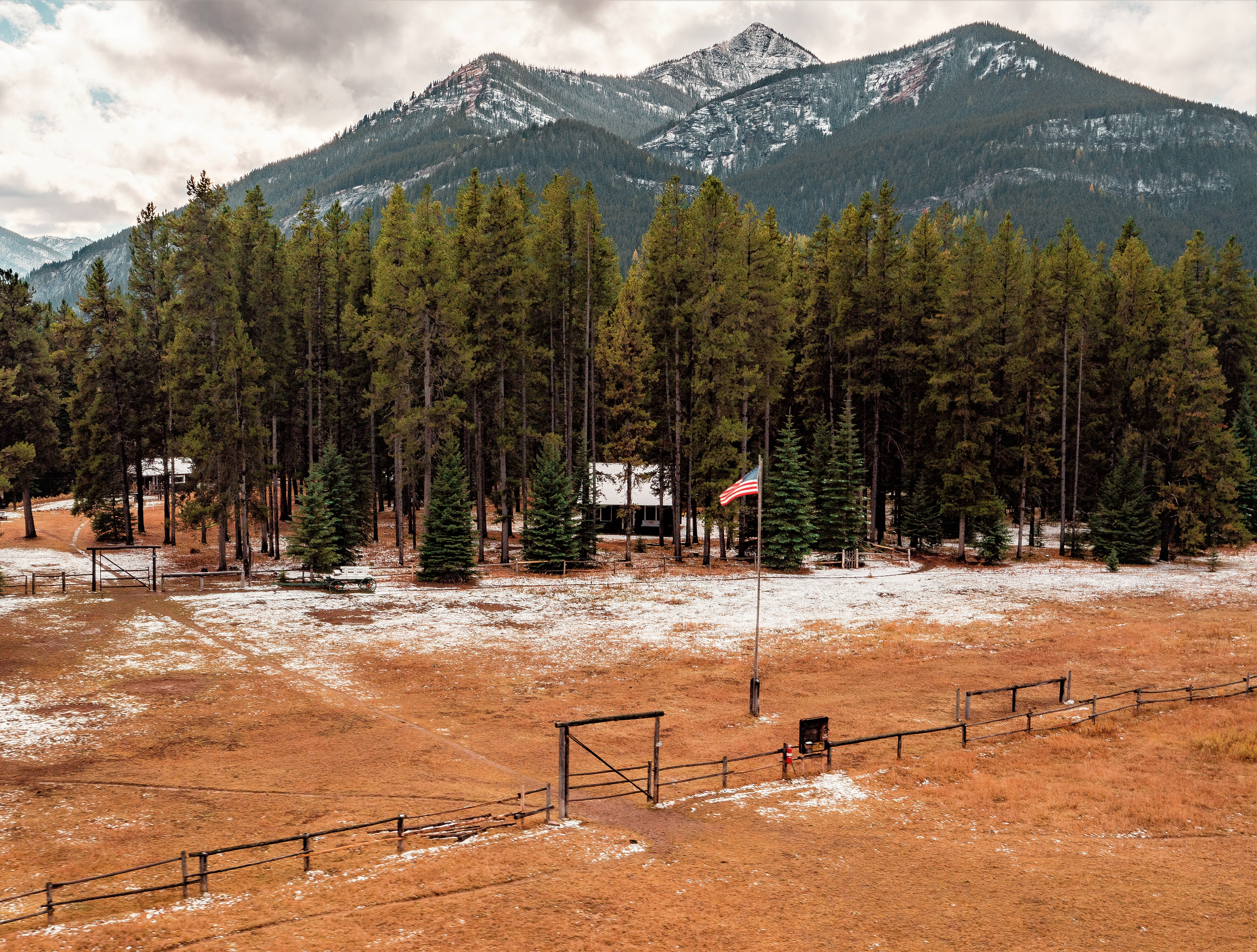
Union Mountain seen from Schafer Ranger Station

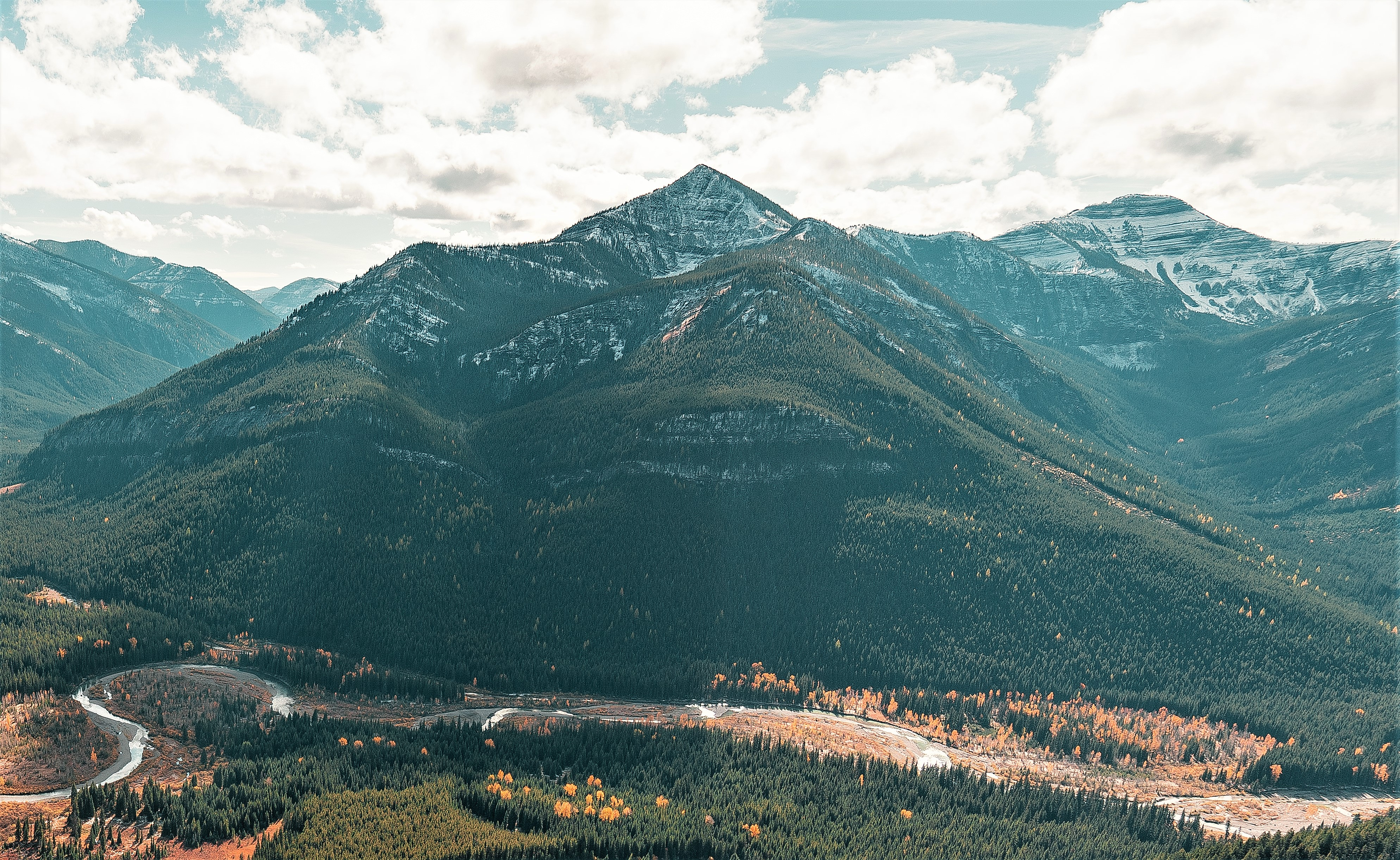
Aerial view of Union centered, with parent Capitol Mountain to right, and Middle Fork Flathead River at bottom of feame.

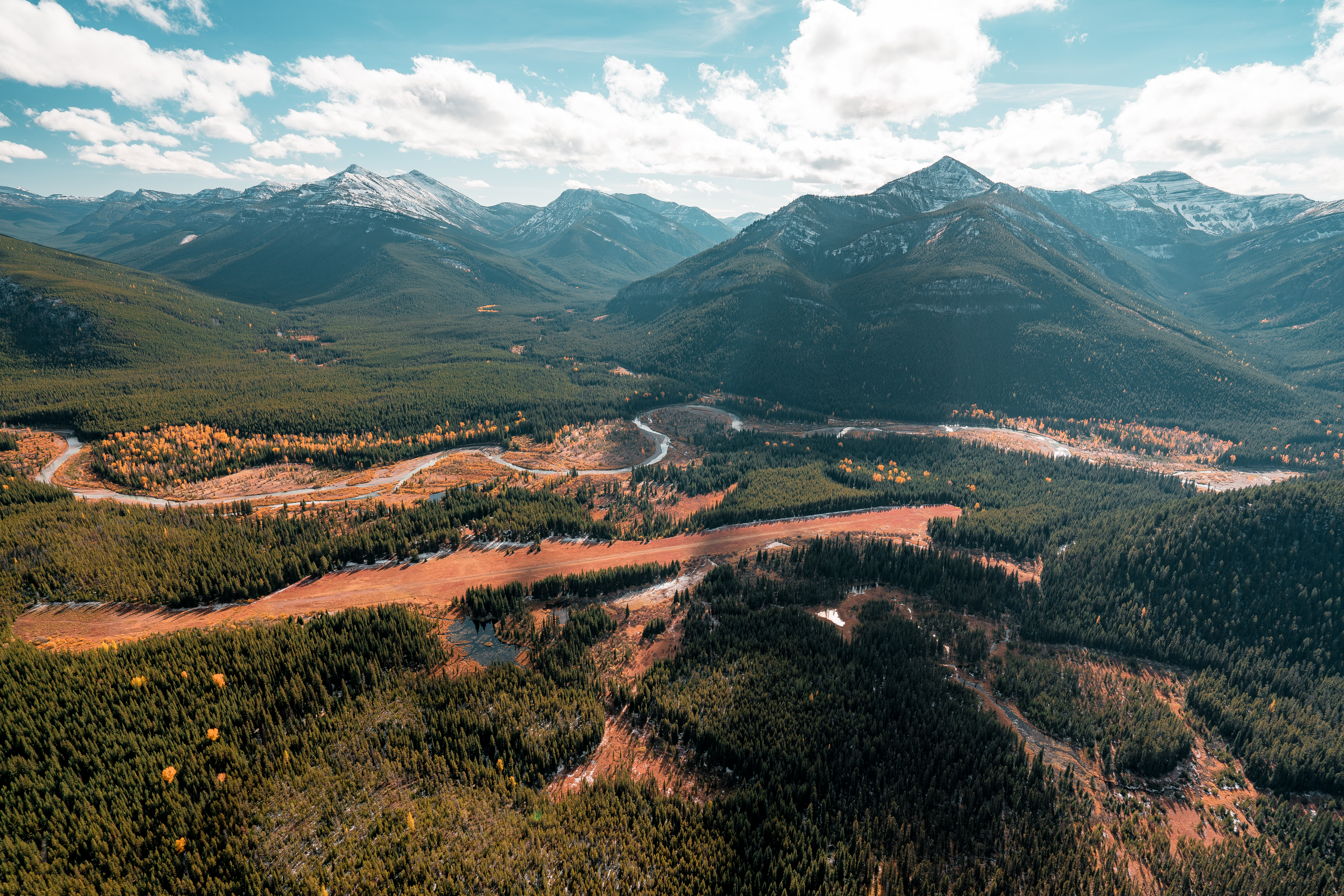
Union Mountain right of center, with Schafer landing strip in front

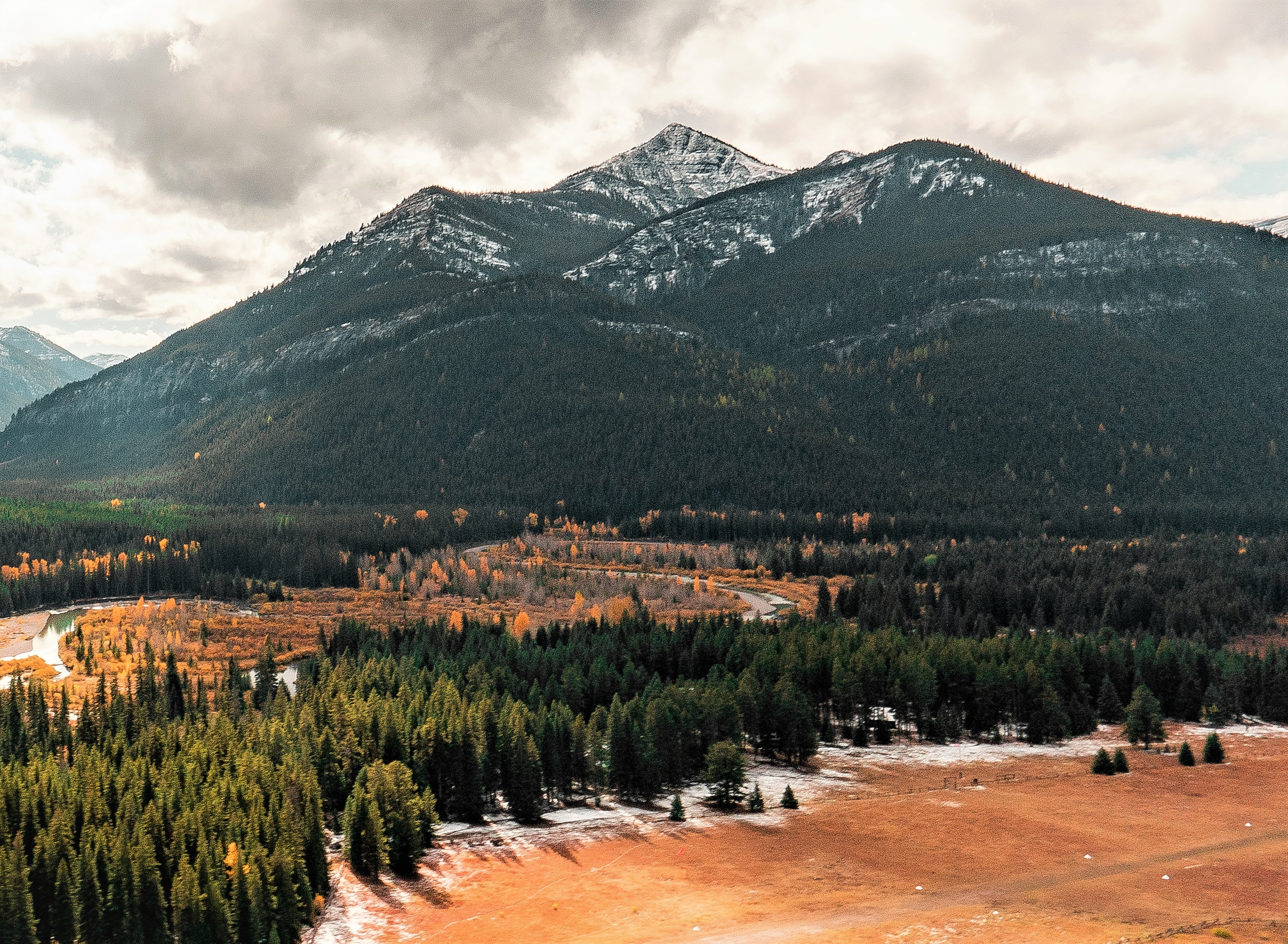

== See also ==
- Geology of the Rocky Mountains
- Argosy Mountain
