= Pumpkin Glacier =

Glacier in the U.S. state of Montana

- Location within Montana
- Type: Mountain glacier
- Location: Glacier National Park, Flathead County, Montana, United States
- Coordinates: 48°35′03″N 113°39′27″W
- Area: Pumpkin and Pumpelly Glaciers combined cover 310 acres (1.3 km^{2}) in 2005
- Terminus: Barren rock
- Status: Retreating

Pumpkin Glacier is a glacier in Glacier National Park in the U.S. state of Montana. It is northeast of Blackfoot Mountain and adjacent to Pumpelly Glacier, the two glaciers separated by crevasses. Pumpkin Glacier covers approximately 35 acres (0.14 km^{2}) at elevations between 8,500 feet (2,600 m) and 8,000 feet (2,400 m) above sea level. Pumpkin Glacier is immediately west of the Continental Divide. Pumpkin and Pumpelly Glaciers covered 310 acres (1.3 km^{2}) as of 2005, a 15 percent reduction in area since 1966.

== See also ==
- List of glaciers in the United States
- Glaciers in Glacier National Park (U.S.)
