= Vigil Peak =

Mountain in the American state of Montana

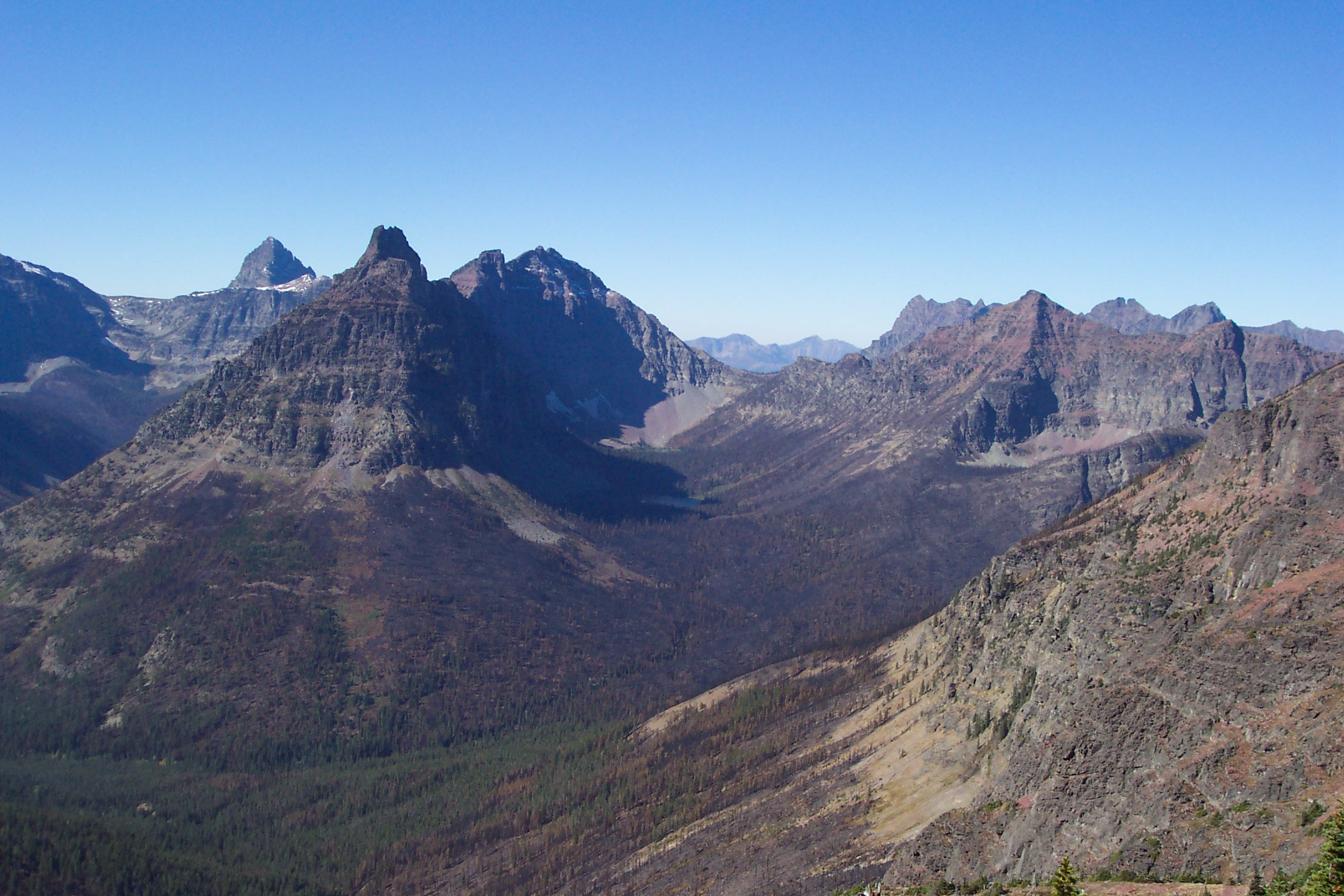
- Vigil Peak on the left, east aspect. (L to R: St. Nicholas, Vigil, Battlement, Caper)

Highest point
- Elevation: 8,593 ft (2,619 m)
- Prominence: 1,073 ft (327 m)
- Coordinates: 48°24′57″N 113°29′03″W

Geography
- Location within Montana Location within the United States
- Location: Flathead County, Montana, U.S.
- Parent range: Lewis Range
- Topo map(s): USGS Mount Rockwell, MT

Climbing
- Easiest route: class 3

Vigil Peak (8,593 feet (2,619 m)) is located in the Lewis Range, Glacier National Park in the U.S. state of Montana. Lake Isabel is northwest of the peak.

== See also ==
- Mountains and mountain ranges of Glacier National Park (U.S.)
