= Pumpelly Glacier =

Glacier in the U.S. state of Montana

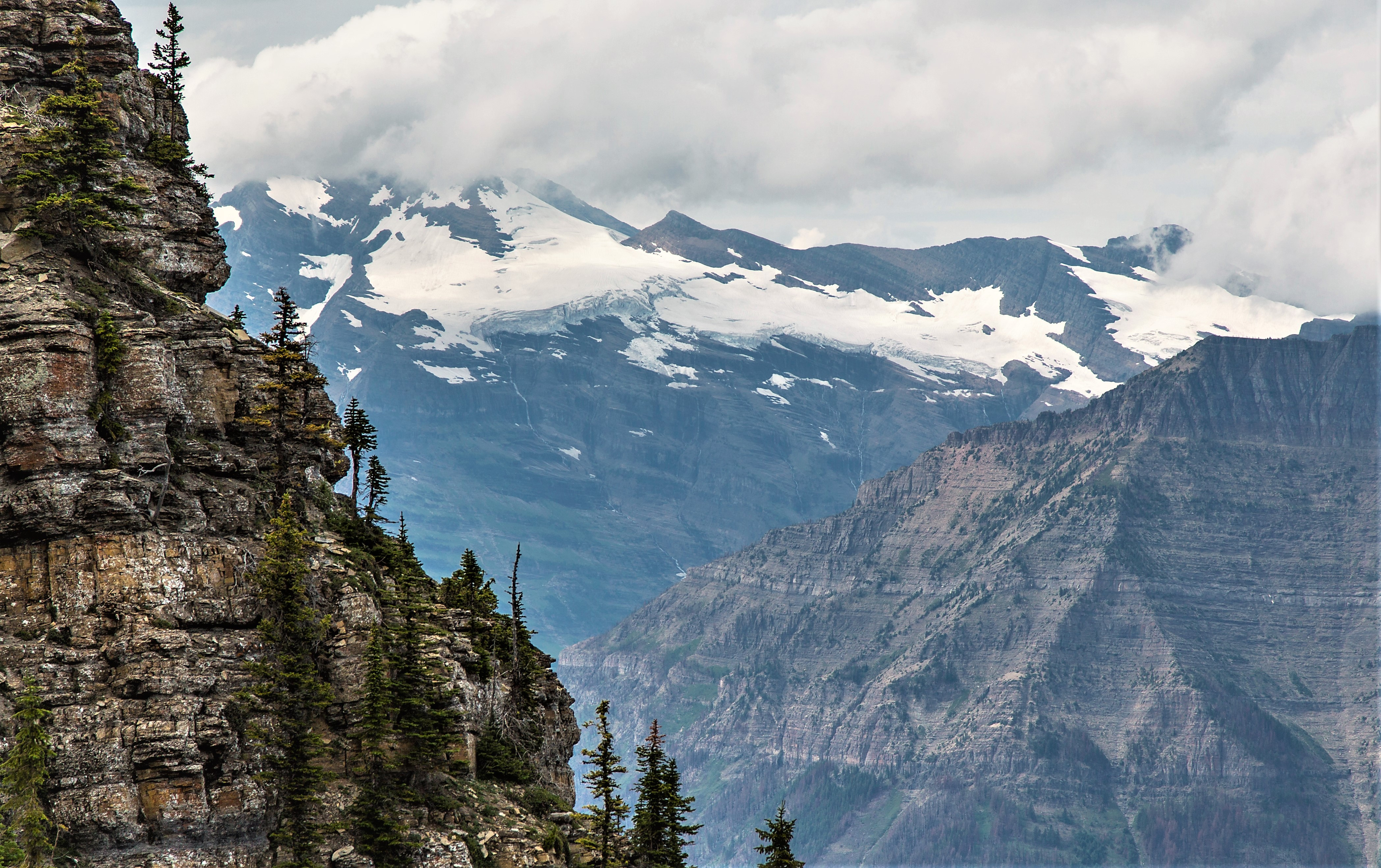
- Pumpelly Glacier seen from Tinkham Mountain

- Location within Montana
- Type: Mountain glacier
- Location: Glacier National Park, Flathead County, Montana, United States
- Coordinates: 48°35′00″N 113°39′33″W
- Area: Pumpelly and Pumpkin Glaciers combined cover 310 acres (1.3 km^{2}) in 2005
- Length: .50 mi (0.80 km)
- Terminus: Barren rock
- Status: Retreating

Pumpelly Glacier is in Glacier National Park in the U.S. state of Montana. The glacier is situated immediately northeast of Blackfoot Mountain at an elevation between 8,500 and 8,000 ft (2,600 and 2,400 m) above sea level. Pumpelly Glacier is just west of the Continental Divide and adjacent to Pumpkin Glacier, the two glaciers separated by crevasses. The glacier was named after Raphael Pumpelly who had first sighted the glacier in 1883. Pumpelly and Pumpkin Glaciers cover 310 acres (1.3 km^{2}) as of 2005, a 15 percent reduction in area since 1966.

== See also ==
- List of glaciers in the United States
- Glaciers in Glacier National Park (U.S.)
