= Blackfoot Glacier =

Glacier in Montana, United States

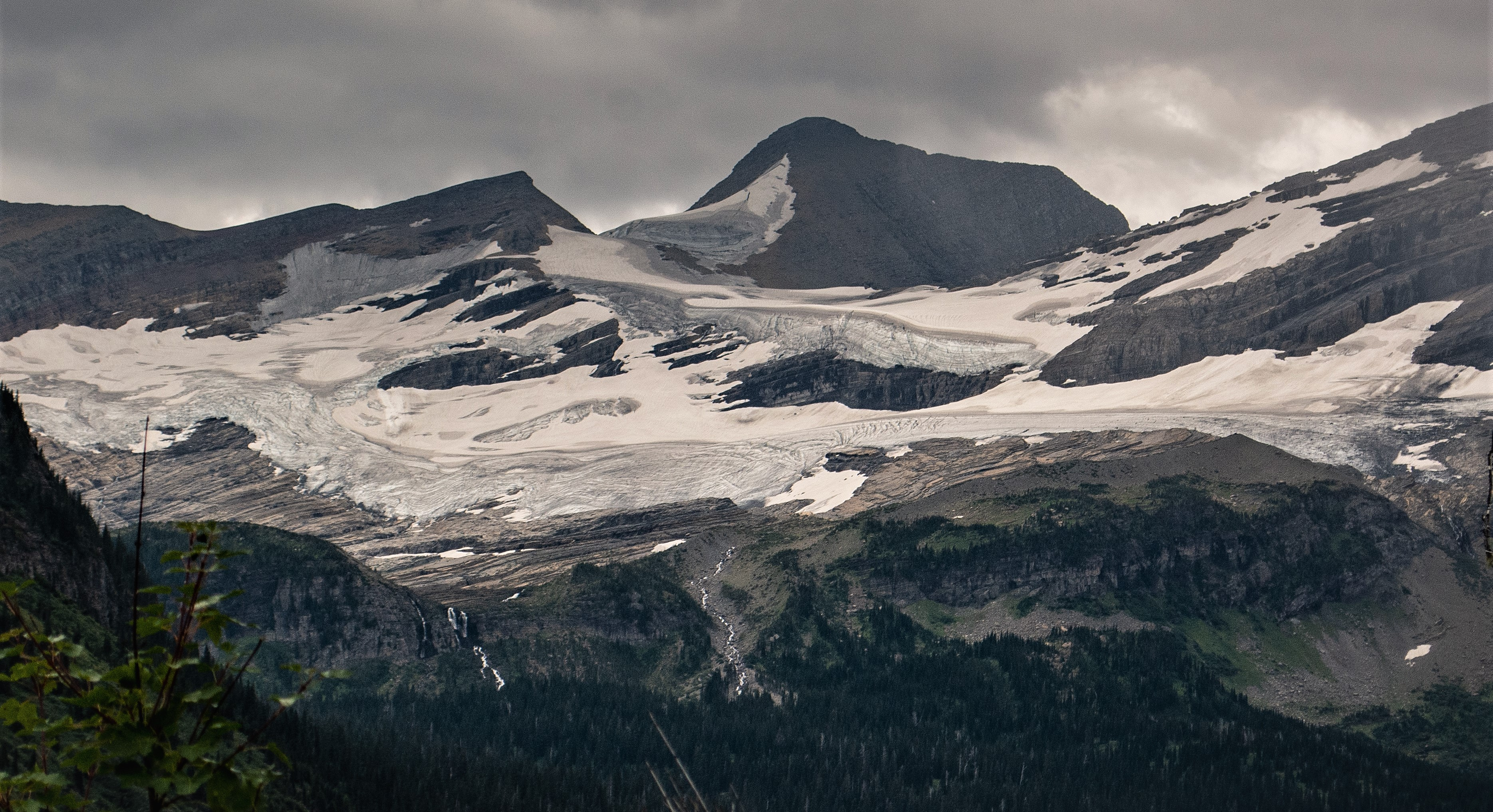
- Blackfoot Glacier and Blackfoot Mountain

- Location within Montana
- Type: Mountain glacier
- Location: Glacier National Park, Glacier County, Montana, U.S.
- Coordinates: 48°35′40″N 113°40′12″W
- Area: 370 acres (1.5 km^{2}) in 2015
- Length: 1 mile (1.6 km)
- Terminus: Moraine
- Status: Retreating

Blackfoot Glacier is the second largest of the remaining 25 glaciers in Glacier National Park, Montana. Blackfoot Glacier is just to the north of Blackfoot Mountain and near Jackson Glacier. The glacier was most recently measured in 2015 at 370 acres (1.5 km^{2}), yet when first documented in 1850, the glacier also included the now separate Jackson Glacier and together, they covered 1,875 acres (7.59 km^{2}). In 1850, there were an estimated 150 glaciers in the park. Glaciologists have stated that by the year 2030, all the glaciers in the park may disappear. However, under a modest increase in overall carbon dioxide levels, some glaciers will remain until the late 23rd century.

Jackson and Blackfoot glaciers have been selected for monitoring by the U.S. Geological Survey's Glacier Monitoring Research program, which is researching changes to the mass balance of glaciers in and surrounding Glacier National Park. The glacier is being monitored using remote sensing equipment and repeat photography, where images of the glacier are taken from identical locations periodically. Between 1966 and 2005, Blackfoot Glacier lost over 23 percent of its surface area. In the summer of 2007, a portion of Blackfoot Glacier broke off and formed an ice avalanche.

Images of Blackfoot Glacier
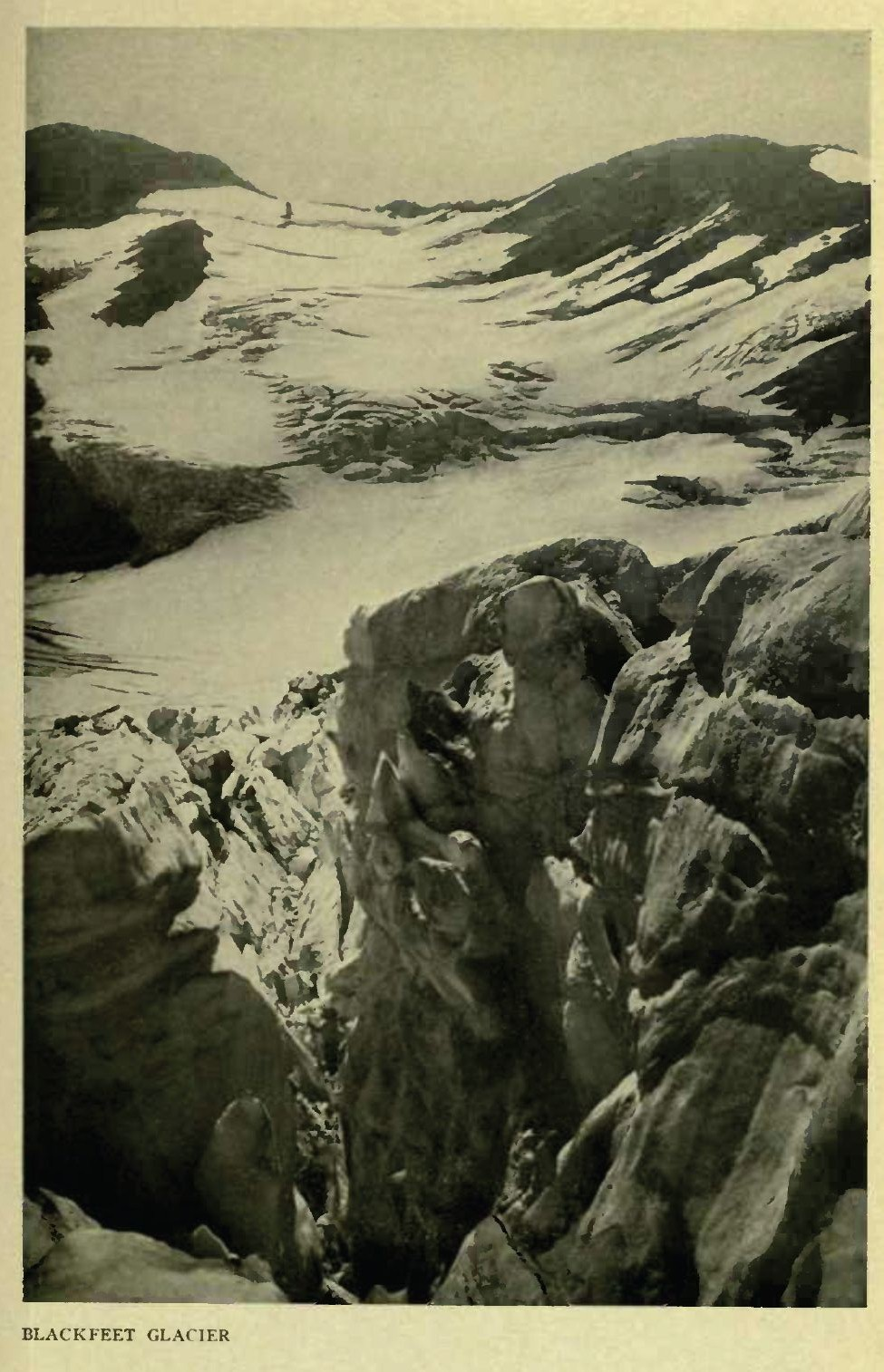
Blackfoot Glacier, 1917

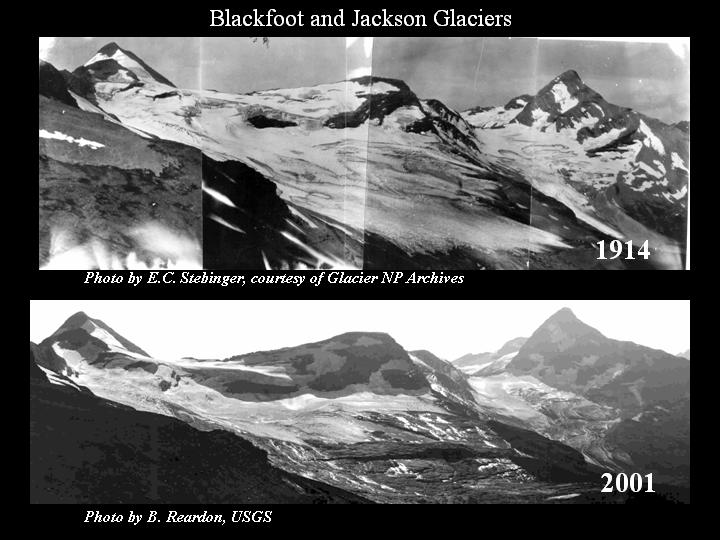
The upper image shows how Blackfoot (on the left) and Jackson Glaciers (on the right) appeared in 1914. The lower image is taken from the same vantage point in 2001

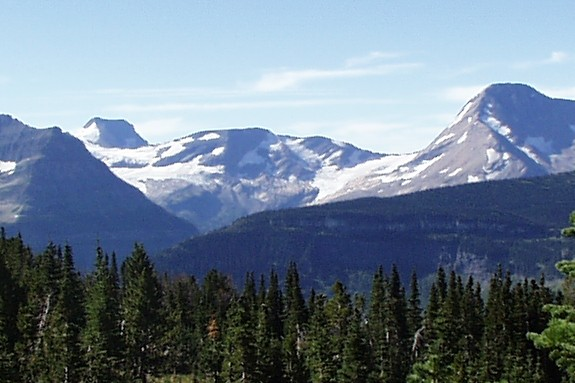
Blackfoot Glacier at left was once joined to Jackson Glacier on the right

== See also ==
- List of glaciers in the United States
- Glaciers in Glacier National Park (U.S.)
