= Capitol Mountain =

Mountain in Montana, United States

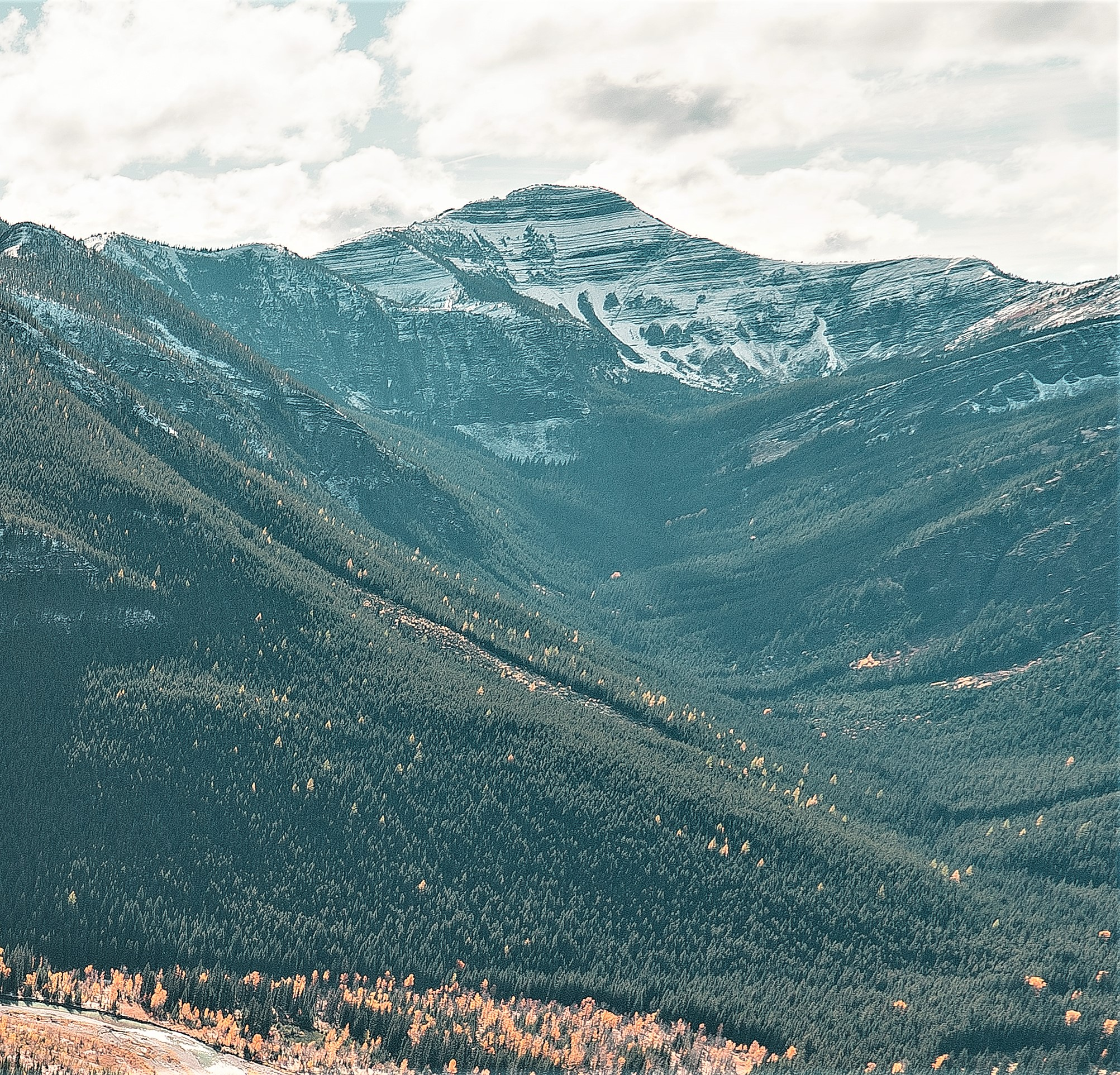
- Northeast aspect

Highest point
- Elevation: 7,868 ft (2,398 m)
- Prominence: 1,308 ft (399 m)
- Parent peak: Argosy Mountain (8,155 ft)
- Isolation: 4.52 mi (7.27 km)
- Coordinates: 48°02′46″N 113°18′58″W

Geography
- Location within Montana Location within the United States
- Location: Flathead County, Montana, U.S.
- Parent range: Rocky Mountains; Flathead Range
- Topo map: USGS Capitol Mountain

Geology
- Rock age: Precambrian
- Rock type: Sedimentary rock

Capitol Mountain is a 7,868-foot (2,398-metre) summit located in Flathead County of the U.S. state of Montana.

== Description ==
Capitol Mountain is located in the Flathead Range, a subset of the Rocky Mountains. It is situated in the Great Bear Wilderness, on land managed by Flathead National Forest. Precipitation runoff from the mountain drains north to the Middle Fork Flathead River, and topographic relief is significant as the summit rises over 2,800 feet (850 meters) above Schafer Creek in less than two miles. Union Mountain is set two miles to the east-northeast, and the nearest higher neighbor is Argosy Mountain, 4.6 miles (7.4 km) to the southeast. Access to this remote peak is from the nearby Shafer Ranger Station at the Schafer landing strip which was grandfathered with the wilderness designation.

== Climate ==
Based on the Köppen climate classification, Capitol Mountain is located in a subarctic climate zone characterized by long, usually very cold winters, and short, cool to mild summers. Winter temperatures can drop below −10 °F with wind chill factors below −30 °F.

== Geology ==
Capitol Mountain is composed of sedimentary rock laid down during the Precambrian to Jurassic periods. Formed in shallow seas, this sedimentary rock was initially uplifted beginning 170 million years ago when the Lewis Overthrust fault pushed an enormous slab of precambrian rocks 3 mi (4.8 km) thick, 50 miles (80 km) wide and 160 miles (260 km) long over younger rock of the cretaceous period.

== See also ==
- Geology of the Rocky Mountains
