= Battlement Mountain =

Mountain in Montana, United States

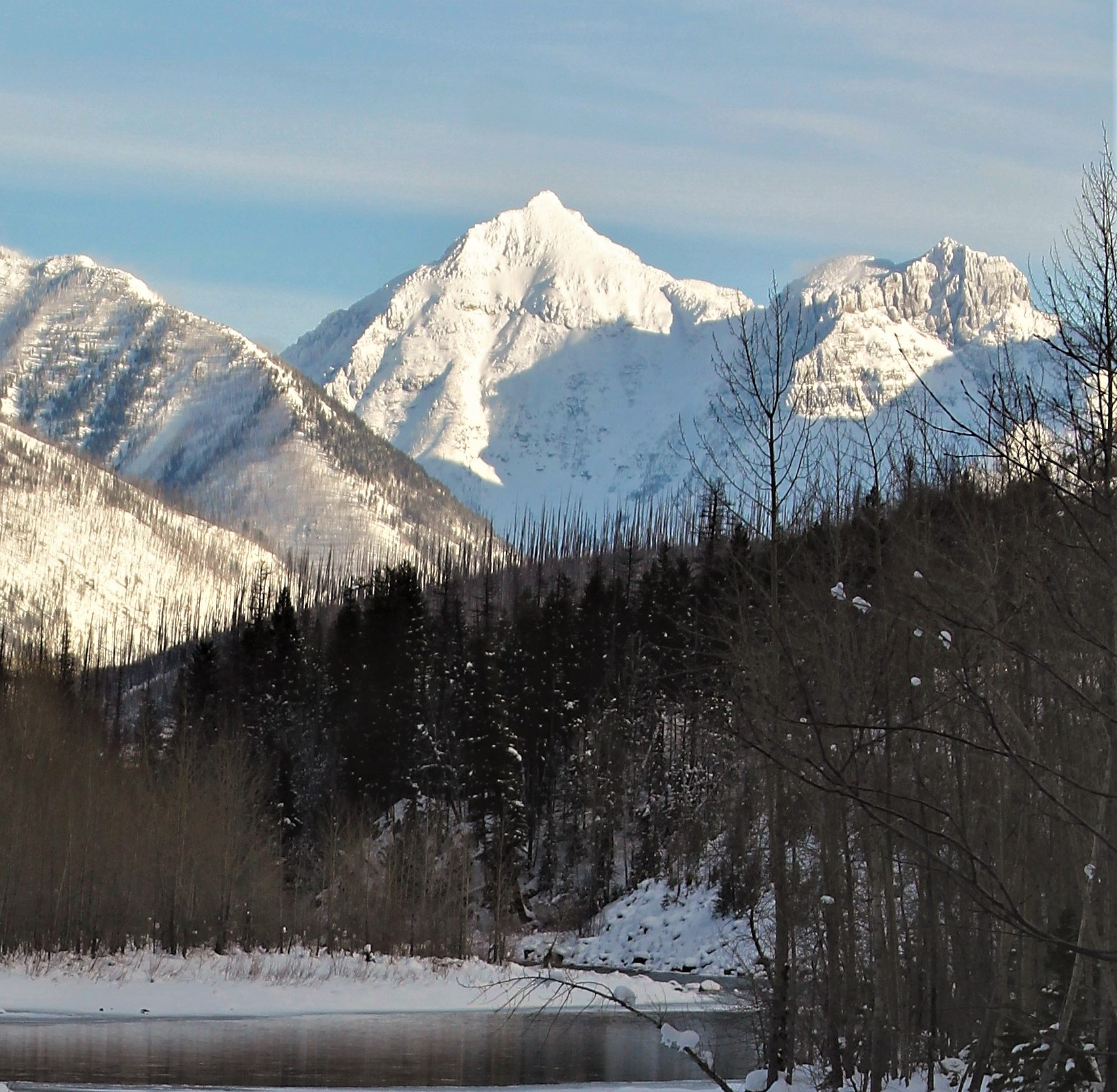
- West aspect

Highest point
- Elevation: 8,830 ft (2,690 m)
- Prominence: 1,155 ft (352 m)
- Listing: Mountains in Flathead County
- Coordinates: 48°24′53″N 113°31′05″W

Geography
- Location within Montana Location within the United States
- Location: Flathead County, Montana, U.S.
- Parent range: Lewis Range
- Topo map(s): USGS Mount Saint Nicholas, MT

Battlement Mountain (8,830 feet (2,691 m)) is located in the Lewis Range, Glacier National Park in the U.S. state of Montana. Lake Isabel is northeast of the peak.

== Geology ==
Like other mountains in Glacier National Park, the peak is composed of sedimentary rock laid down during the Precambrian to Jurassic periods. Formed in shallow seas, this sedimentary rock was initially uplifted beginning 170 million years ago when the Lewis Overthrust fault pushed an enormous slab of precambrian rocks 3 mi (4.8 km) thick, 50 miles (80 km) wide and 160 miles (260 km) long over younger rock of the cretaceous period.

== Climate ==
Based on the Köppen climate classification, the peak is located in an alpine subarctic climate zone with long, cold, snowy winters, and cool to warm summers. Temperatures can drop below −10 °F with wind chill factors below −30 °F.

== See also ==
- List of mountains and mountain ranges of Glacier National Park (U.S.)
