= Jackson Glacier =

Glacier in Montana, United States

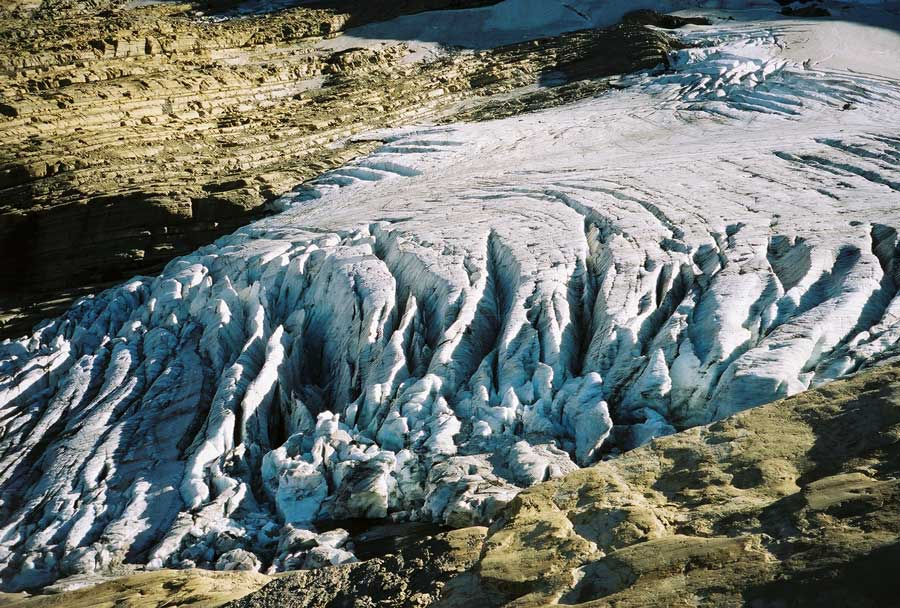
- Terminus of Jackson Glacier

- Location within Montana
- Type: Mountain glacier
- Location: Glacier National Park, Glacier County, Montana, U.S.
- Coordinates: 48°35′55″N 113°42′04″W
- Area: 250 acres (1.0 km^{2}) in 2005
- Length: 0.7 miles (1.1 km)
- Terminus: Bare rock
- Status: Retreating

Jackson Glacier is approximately the seventh largest of the remaining 25 glaciers in Glacier National Park located in the US state of Montana. A part of the largest grouping of glaciers in the park, Jackson Glacier rests on the north side of Mount Jackson. The glacier was most recently measured in 2005 at 250 acres (1.0 km^{2}), yet when first documented in 1850, the glacier also included the now separate Blackfoot Glacier and together, they covered 1,875 acres (7.59 km^{2}). Between 1966 and 2005, Jackson Glacier lost almost a third of its acreage. When the two glaciers were united prior to their separation sometime before 1929, they were known simply as Blackfoot Glacier.

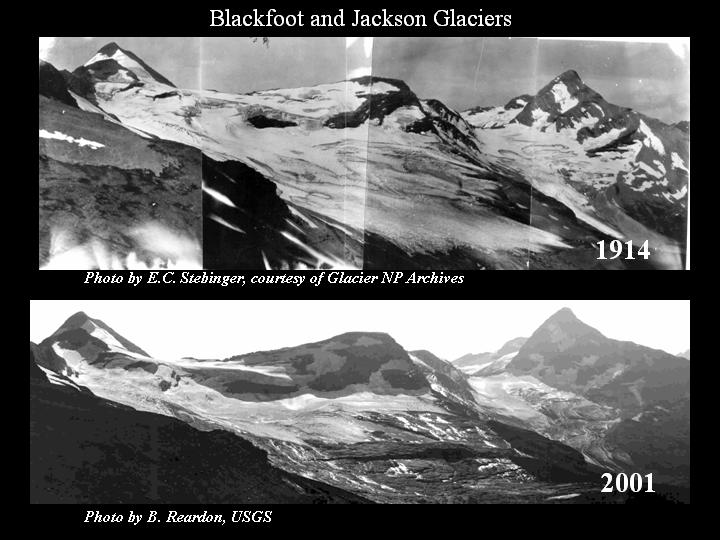
The upper image shows how Blackfoot (on the left) and Jackson Glaciers (on the right) appeared in 1914. The lower image is taken from the same vantage point in 2001.

In 1850, there were an estimated 150 glaciers in the park. Glaciologists have stated that by the year 2030, many if not all of the glaciers in the park may disappear completely. Jackson and Blackfoot glaciers have been selected for monitoring by the U.S. Geological Survey's Glacier Monitoring Research program, which is researching changes to the mass balance of glaciers in and surrounding Glacier National Park. The glacier is being monitored using remote sensing equipment and repeat photography, where images of the glacier are taken from identical locations periodically. Jackson Glacier is one of the easiest of the park's glaciers to observe, and is located south of the Going-to-the-Sun Road on the east side of the Continental Divide, upper St. Mary Valley.

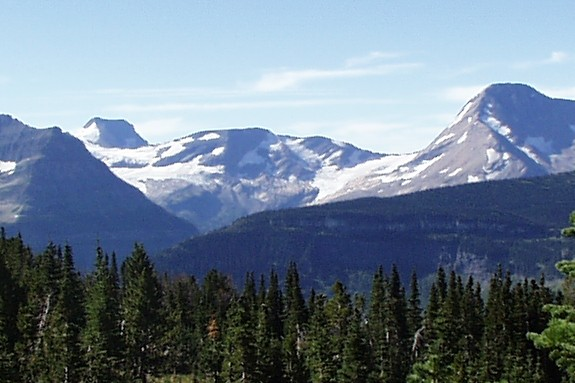
Jackson Glacier at right was once joined to Blackfoot Glacier on the left.

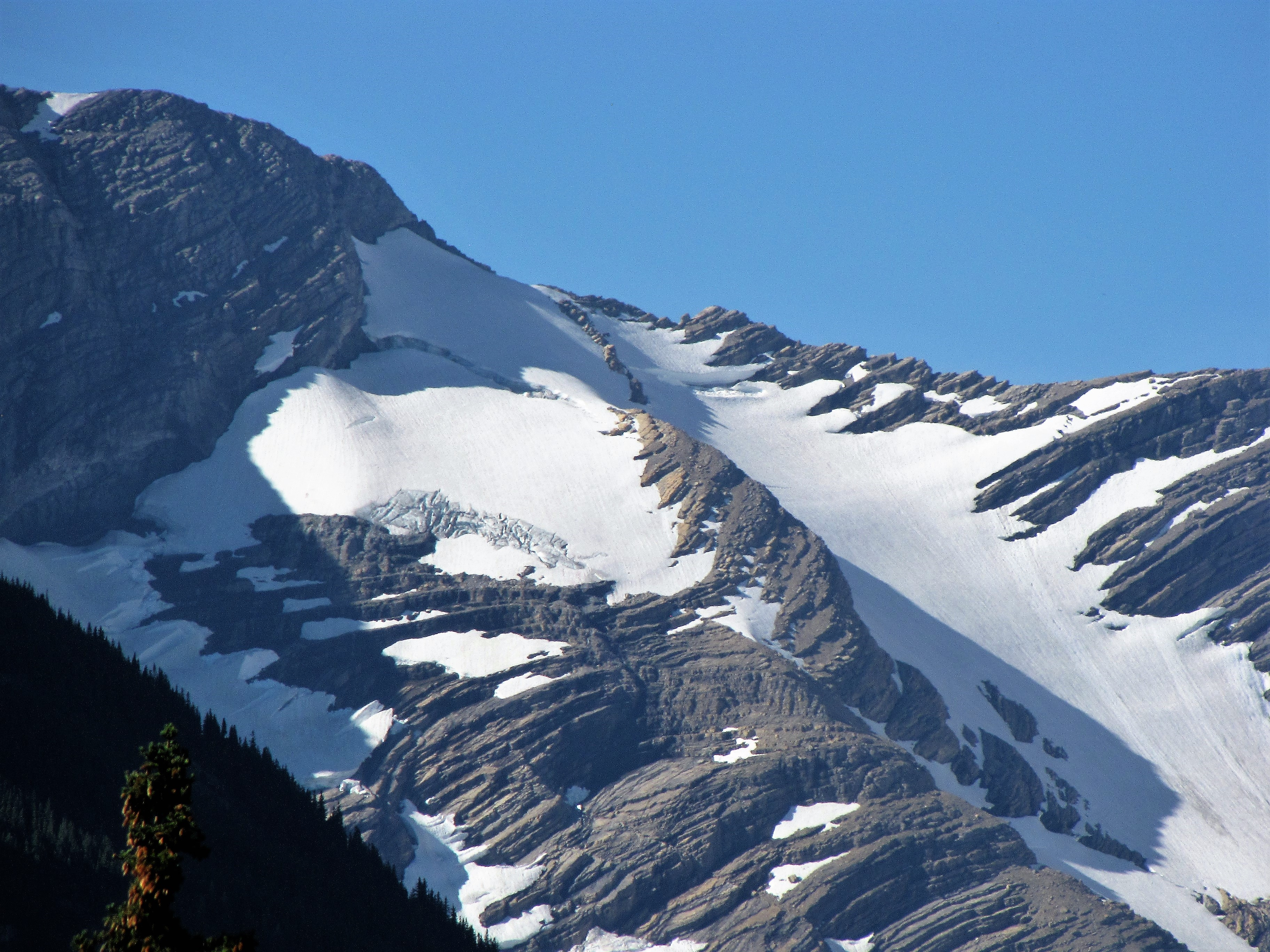
A glacial remnant to east of Jackson Glacier in July 2017

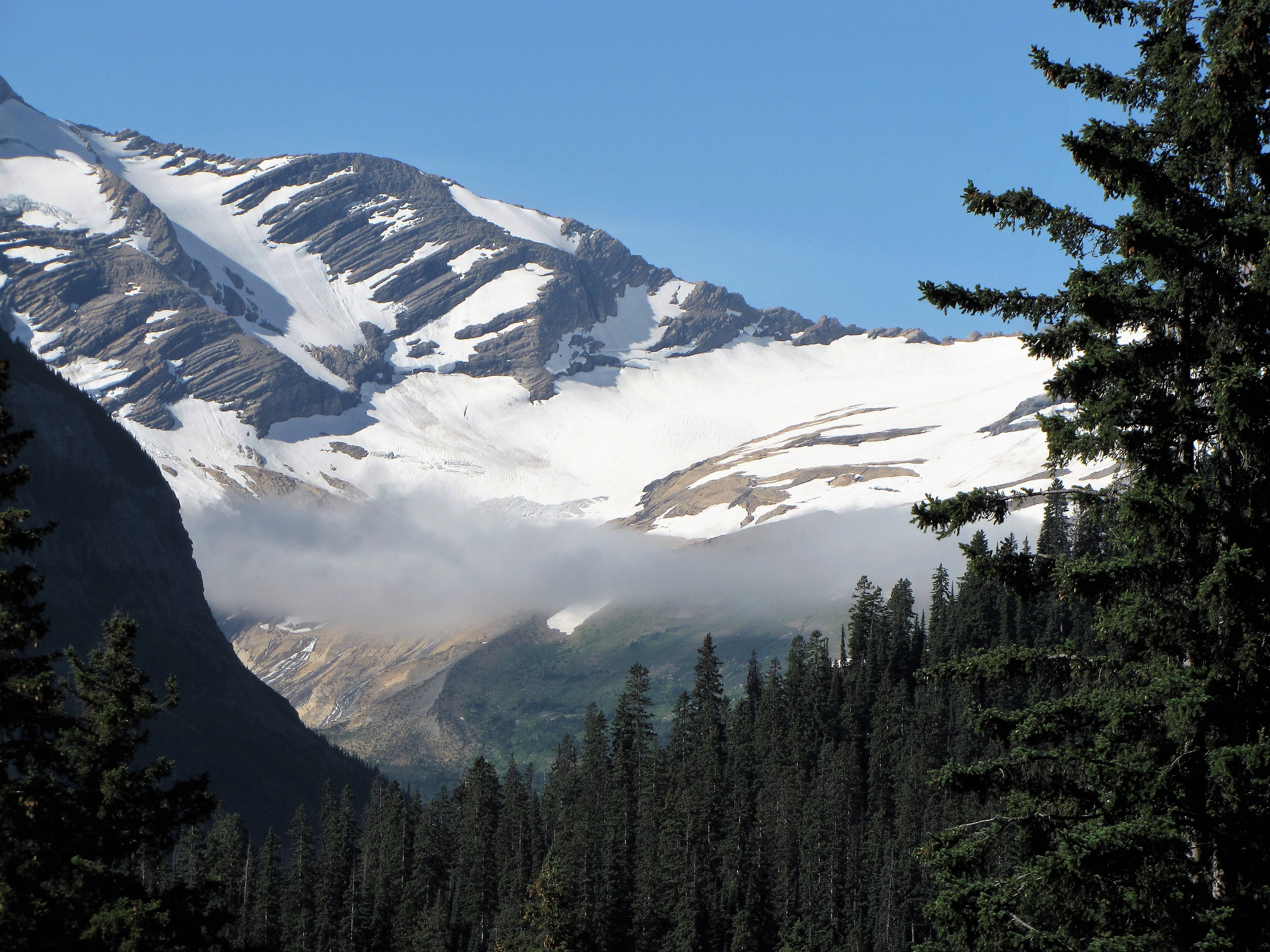
Jackson Glacier from the Going-to-the-Sun Road in July 2017

== See also ==
- List of glaciers in the United States
- Glaciers in Glacier National Park (U.S.)
