= Mount Jackson (Montana) =

Mountain in Montana, United States

- Northeast aspect

Highest point
- Elevation: 10,052 ft (3,064 m)
- Prominence: 3,406 ft (1,038 m)
- Parent peak: Mount Cleveland
- Listing: Mountains in Flathead County, Montana
- Coordinates: 48°36′02″N 113°43′19″W

Geography
- Location within Montana
- Location: Flathead County, Montana, Glacier County, Montana, U.S.
- Parent range: Lewis Range
- Topo map(s): USGS Mount Jackson, MT

Mount Jackson (10,052 feet (3,064 m)) is located in the Lewis Range, Glacier National Park in the U.S. state of Montana. Mount Jackson is the fourth tallest mountain in Glacier National Park and it is situated on the Continental Divide. Both the mountain and its namesake Jackson Glacier are easily seen from the Going-to-the-Sun Road. Harrison Glacier, the park's largest remaining glacier, is located on the mountain's southern flank. Based on the Köppen climate classification, Mount Jackson has an alpine climate characterized by long, usually very cold winters, and short, cool to mild summers. Temperatures can drop below −10 °F with wind chill factors below −30 °F.

== Geology ==
Like other mountains in Glacier National Park, Mount Jackson is composed of sedimentary rock laid down during the Precambrian to Jurassic periods. Formed in shallow seas, this sedimentary rock was initially uplifted beginning 170 million years ago when the Lewis Overthrust fault pushed an enormous slab of precambrian rocks 3 mi (4.8 km) thick, 50 miles (80 km) wide and 160 miles (260 km) long over younger rock of the cretaceous period.

== Climate ==
Climate data for Mount Jackson 48.6002 N, 113.7226 W, Elevation: 9,193 ft (2,802 m) (1991–2020 normals)
Month	Jan	Feb	Mar	Apr	May	Jun	Jul	Aug	Sep	Oct	Nov	Dec	Year
Mean daily maximum °F (°C)	22.5 (−5.3)	22.0 (−5.6)	25.8 (−3.4)	30.8 (−0.7)	40.2 (4.6)	48.2 (9.0)	59.2 (15.1)	59.7 (15.4)	51.4 (10.8)	38.1 (3.4)	26.2 (−3.2)	21.2 (−6.0)	37.1 (2.8)
Daily mean °F (°C)	15.9 (−8.9)	14.1 (−9.9)	16.9 (−8.4)	21.3 (−5.9)	29.8 (−1.2)	37.0 (2.8)	46.3 (7.9)	46.7 (8.2)	39.0 (3.9)	28.6 (−1.9)	19.8 (−6.8)	15.0 (−9.4)	27.5 (−2.5)
Mean daily minimum °F (°C)	9.3 (−12.6)	6.3 (−14.3)	7.9 (−13.4)	11.7 (−11.3)	19.4 (−7.0)	25.9 (−3.4)	33.4 (0.8)	33.6 (0.9)	26.7 (−2.9)	19.1 (−7.2)	13.4 (−10.3)	8.8 (−12.9)	18.0 (−7.8)
Average precipitation inches (mm)	11.73 (298)	9.89 (251)	10.54 (268)	8.06 (205)	7.39 (188)	8.89 (226)	3.08 (78)	2.98 (76)	4.96 (126)	8.48 (215)	12.08 (307)	12.30 (312)	100.38 (2,550)
Source: PRISM Climate Group

== Gallery ==
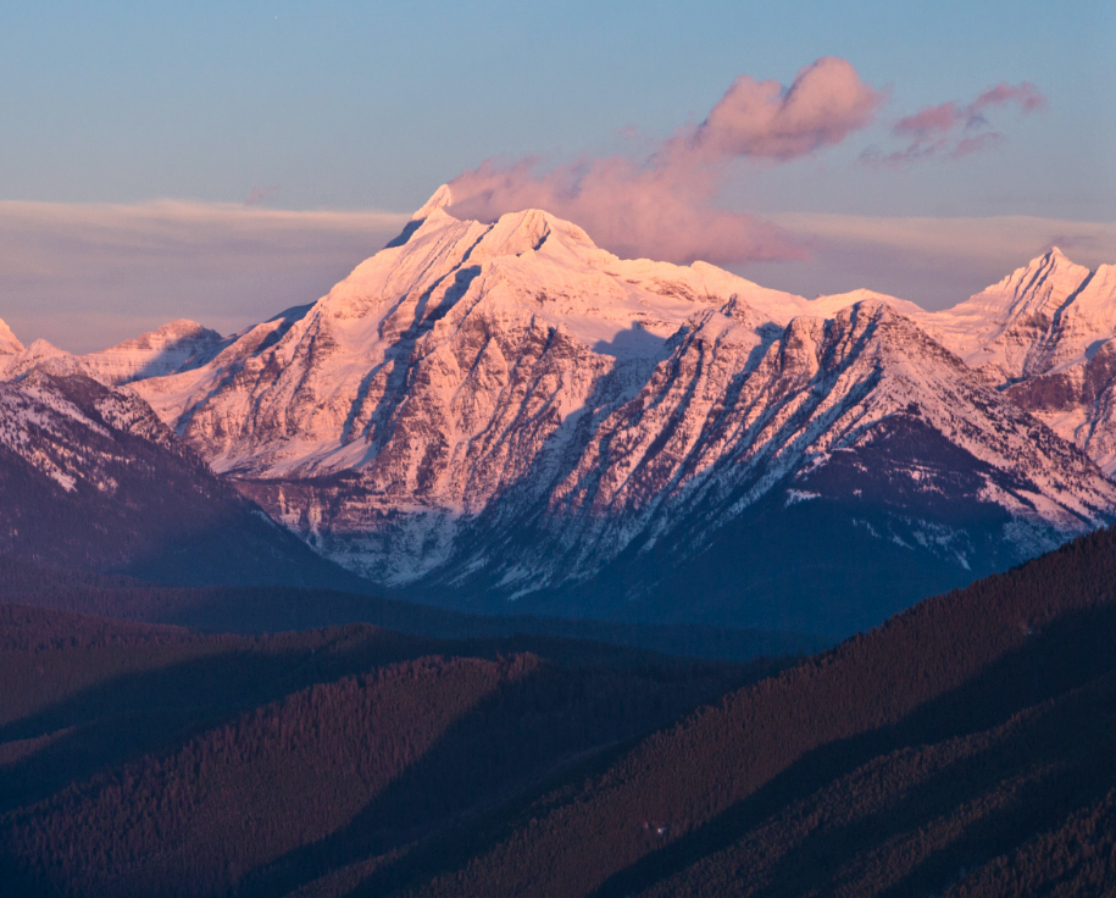
West-southwest aspect of Mount Jackson at sunset

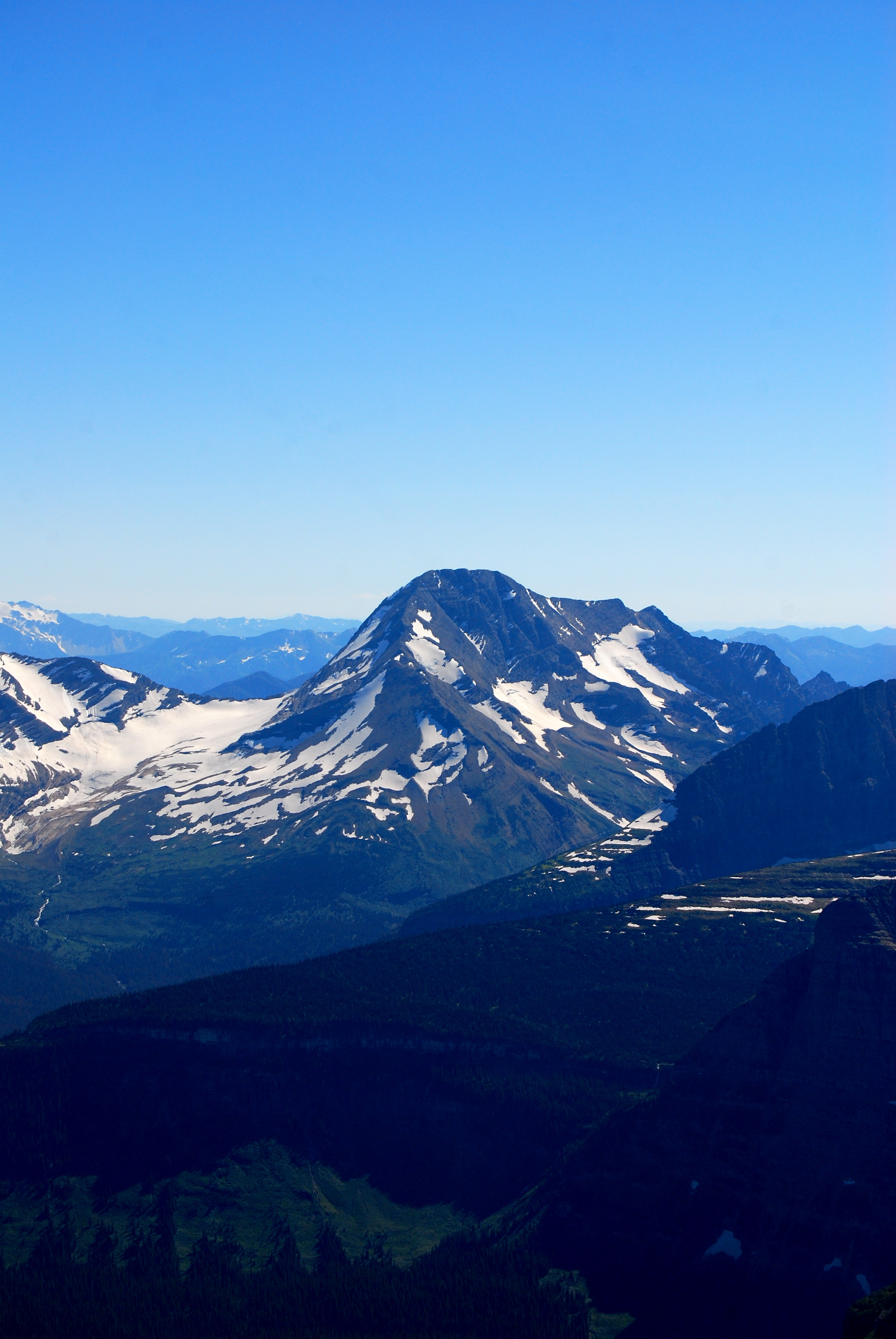
Mount Jackson with Jackson Glacier directly to the left of the mountain

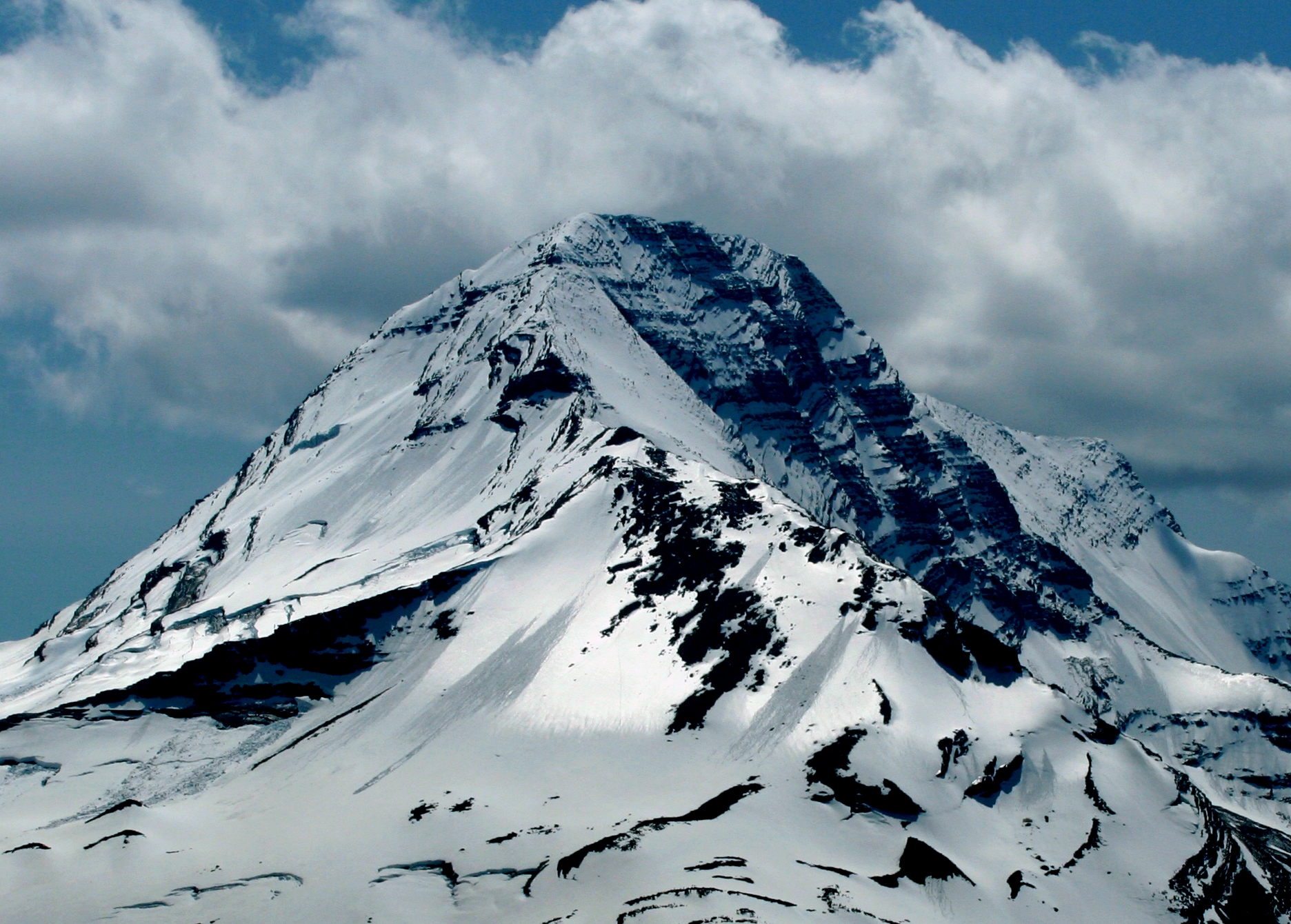
North-northeast aspect of Mount Jackson

== See also ==
- Mountains and mountain ranges of Glacier National Park (U.S.)
- Geology of the Rocky Mountains
