= Lake Isabel (Flathead County, Montana) =

Lake in Montana, United States

- Location within Montana Location within the United States
- Location: Glacier National Park, Flathead County, Montana, US
- Coordinates: 48°25′20″N 113°29′37″W
- Type: Natural
- Basin countries: United States
- Max. length: .35 mi (0.56 km)
- Max. width: .25 mi (0.40 km)
- Surface elevation: 5,715 ft (1,742 m)

Lake Isabel is located in Glacier National Park, in the U. S. state of Montana. Lake Isabel is northeast of Battlement Mountain and northwest of Vigil Peak. Located in a remote region of Glacier National Park, Lake Isabel is a 30 miles (48 km) roundtrip hike from Two Medicine Lake.

== See also ==
- List of lakes in Flathead County, Montana (A-L)
