= Blackfoot Mountain =

Mountain in the state of Montana

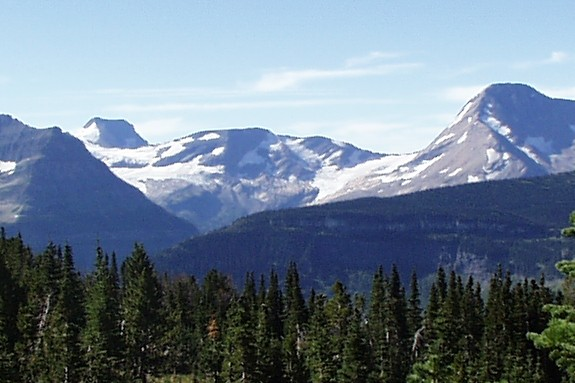
- Blackfoot Mountain is along the skyline in the background on the left beyond Blackfoot Glacier

Highest point
- Elevation: 9,579 ft (2,920 m) NAVD 88
- Prominence: 1,721 ft (525 m)
- Parent peak: Mount Jackson
- Listing: Mountains in Flathead County, Montana
- Coordinates: 48°34′55″N 113°40′06″W

Geography
- Location within Montana Location within the United States
- Location: Flathead County, Montana, U.S.
- Parent range: Lewis Range
- Topo map: USGS Mount Jackson

Climbing
- First ascent: 1894 Henry L. Stimson

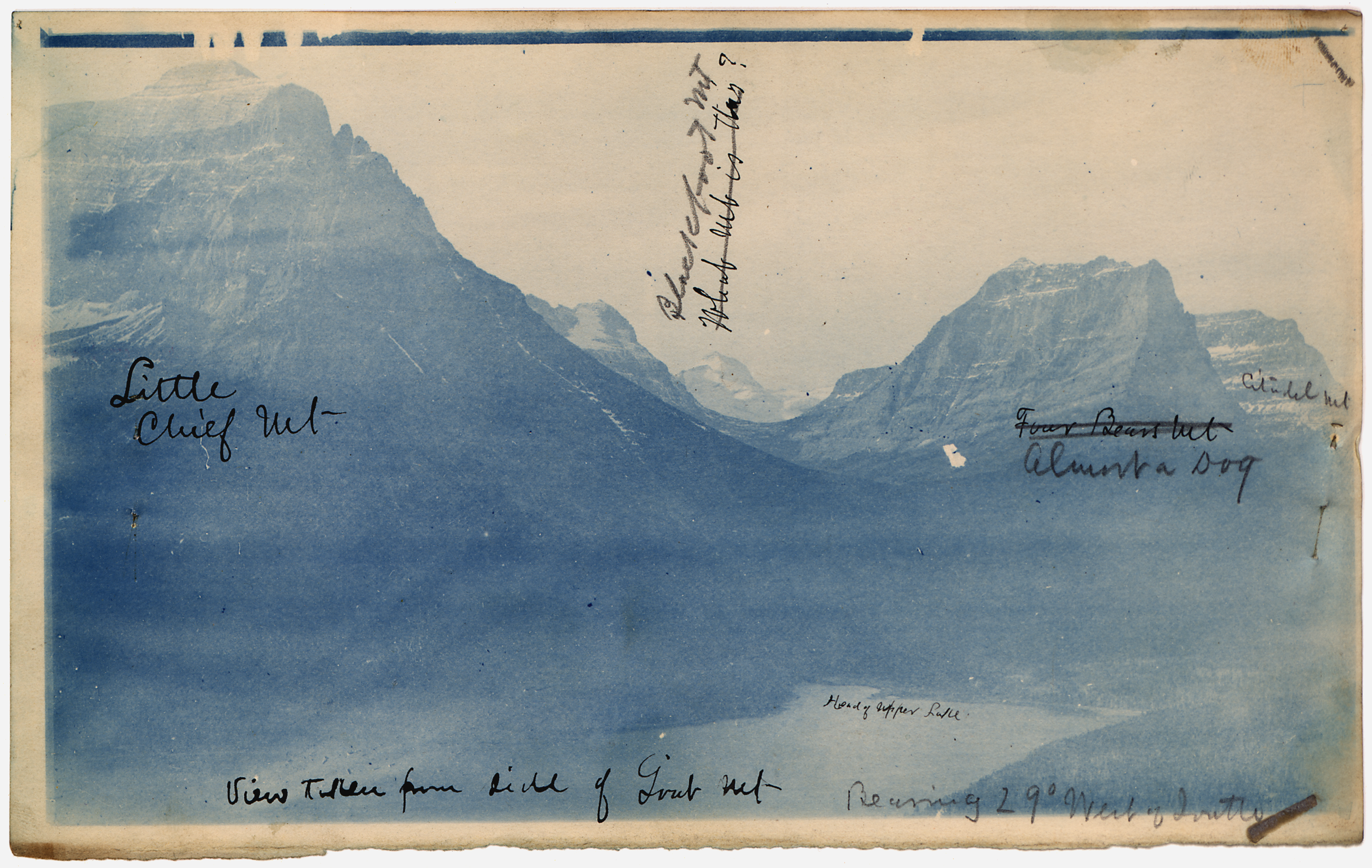
Little Chief Mountain, Blackfoot Mountain, and Citadel Mountain, viewed from Goat Mountain

Blackfoot Mountain (9,579 ft (2,920 m)) is located in the Lewis Range, Glacier National Park in the U.S. state of Montana. To the north of Blackfoot Mountain lies Blackfoot Glacier, one of the largest glaciers in the park. The stagnant Pumpelly Glacier is located to the immediate east and northeast of the mountain.

== See also ==
- List of mountains and mountain ranges of Glacier National Park (U.S.)
