= Harrison Glacier =

Alpine glacier in Montana, United States

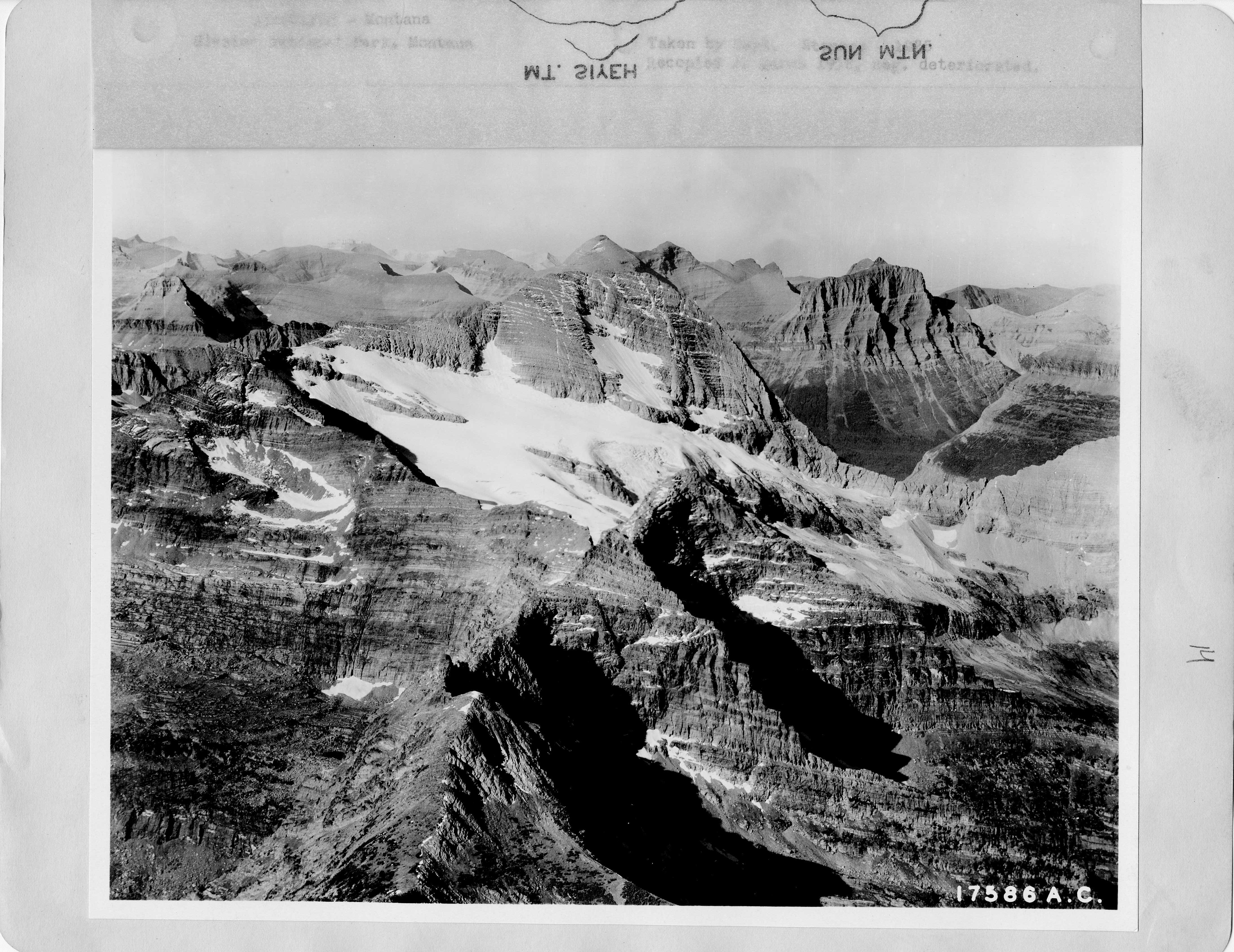
- Harrison Glacier centered, circa 1925

- Location within Montana
- Type: Mountain glacier
- Location: Glacier National Park, Flathead County, Montana, United States
- Coordinates: 48°35′34″N 113°43′49″W
- Area: 466 acres (189 ha) in 2005
- Length: .50 mi (0.80 km)
- Terminus: Barren rock/talus
- Status: Retreating

Harrison Glacier is a glacier located in the US state of Montana in Glacier National Park. Situated on a southeast‐facing ridge immediately south of Mount Jackson, it is the largest remaining glacier in Glacier National Park, estimated in 2005 to have an area of 466 acres (1.89 km^{2}). Though many experts have stated that all the glaciers in Glacier National Park may disappear by the year 2030, Harrison Glacier lost only 9 percent of its surface area in the 40-year period between 1966 and 2005 and will likely still exist well beyond 2030. Compared to many of the vanishing glaciers in Glacier National Park, Harrison Glacier's accumulation zone is at a much higher altitude (approximately 9,000 feet (2,700 m)), which has allowed it to maintain some equilibrium in its glacier mass balance. Comparisons of images of the glacier taken in 1913 with images from 2009 indicate that the glacier has experienced thinning and retreat.

== See also ==
- List of glaciers in the United States
- Glaciers in Glacier National Park (U.S.)
