= Gable Peaks =

Mountain in Montana, United States

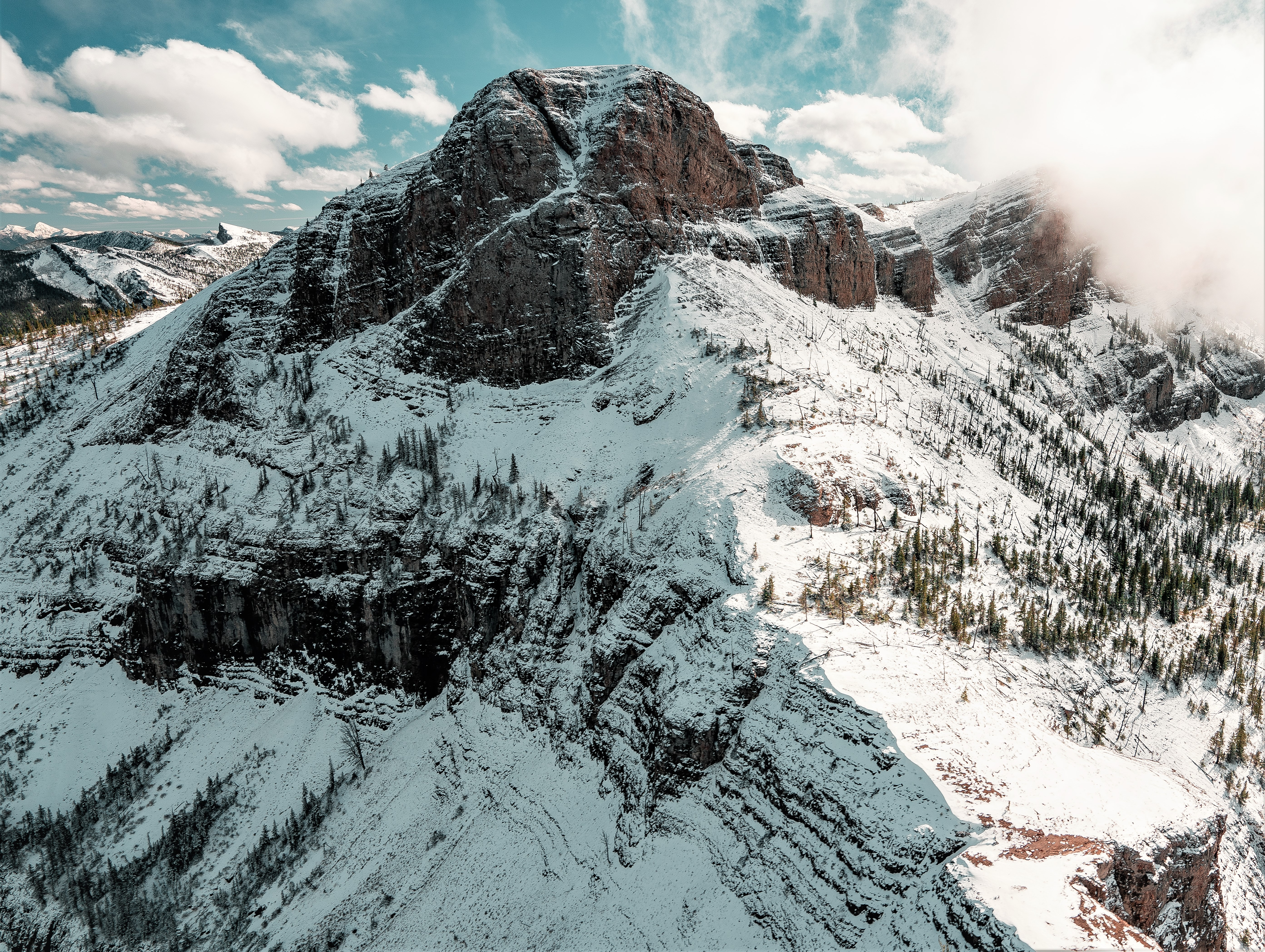
- Aerial view of north peak

Highest point
- Elevation: 7,700 ft (2,347 m)
- Prominence: 480 ft (146 m)
- Parent peak: Trilobite Peak (8,245 ft)
- Isolation: 3.34 mi (5.38 km)
- Coordinates: 48°02′24″N 113°10′32″W

Geography
- Location within Montana Location within the United States
- Location: Flathead County, Montana, U.S.
- Parent range: Rocky Mountains; Flathead Range; Trilobite Range
- Topo map: USGS Gable Peaks

Geology
- Rock age: Precambrian
- Rock type: Sedimentary rock

Gable Peaks is a remote 7,700-foot (2,347-metre) double summit mountain located in Flathead County of the U.S. state of Montana.

== Description ==
Gable Peaks is located at the north end of the Trilobite Range, which is a subset of the Flathead Range. It is situated on the common boundary shared by Great Bear Wilderness and the Bob Marshall Wilderness, on land managed by Flathead National Forest. The 7,700-foot north peak and 7,698-foot south peak are 0.35 mile apart. Precipitation runoff from the mountain drains north to the Middle Fork Flathead River, and topographic relief is significant as the summit rises over 2,700 feet (820 meters) above the river in approximately 1.5 mile. The nearest higher neighbor is Cruiser Mountain, 3.5 miles (5.6 km) to the south-southeast.

== Climate ==
Based on the Köppen climate classification, Gable Peaks is located in a subarctic climate zone characterized by long, usually very cold winters, and short, cool to mild summers. Winter temperatures can drop below −10 °F with wind chill factors below −30 °F.

== Geology ==
Gable Peaks is composed of sedimentary rock laid down during the Precambrian to Jurassic periods. Formed in shallow seas, this sedimentary rock was initially uplifted beginning 170 million years ago when the Lewis Overthrust fault pushed an enormous slab of precambrian rocks 3 mi (4.8 km) thick, 50 miles (80 km) wide and 160 miles (260 km) long over younger rock of the cretaceous period.

== Gallery ==
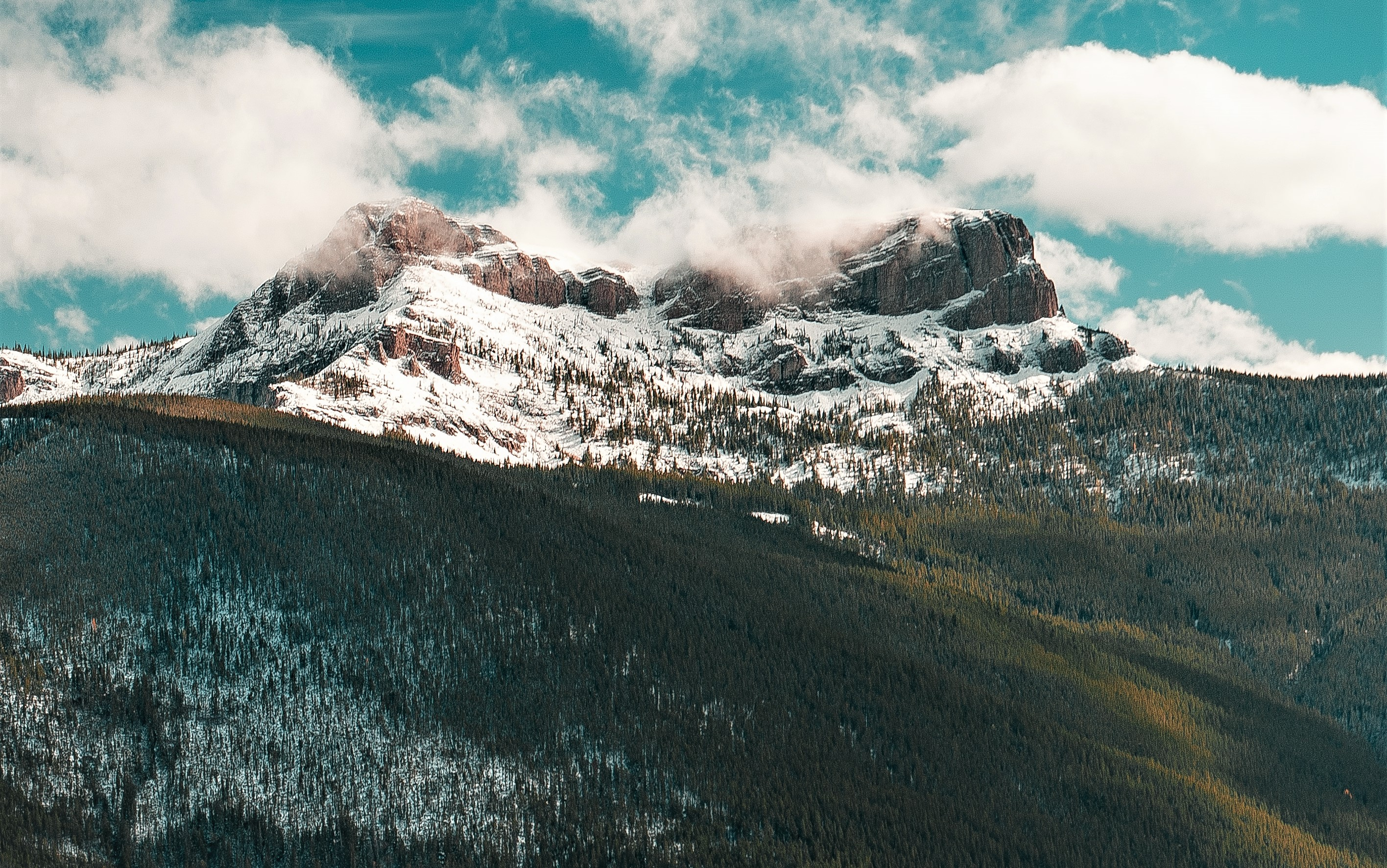
North peak to left, south peak to right.

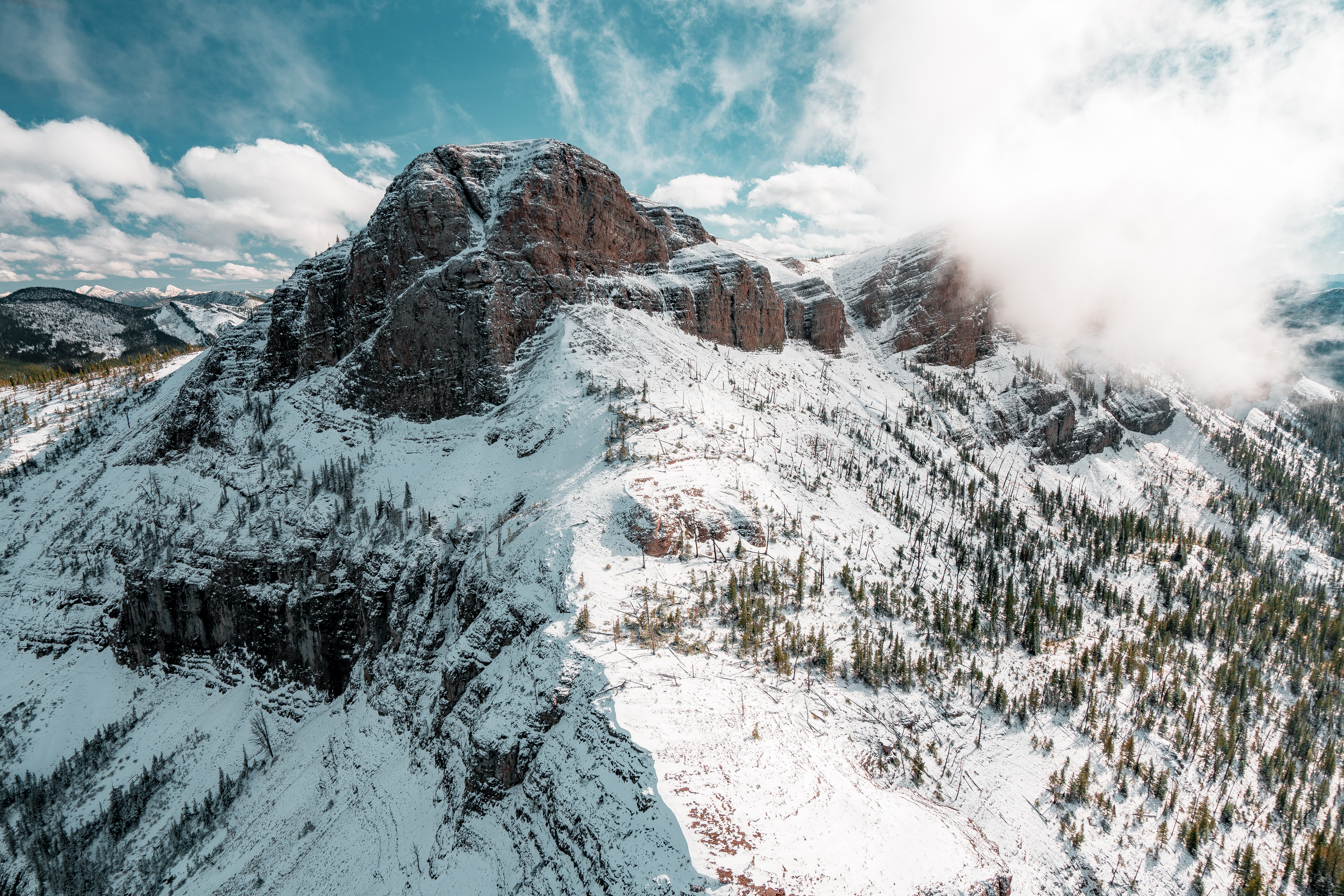
Aerial view of north peak to left, with south peak to right in cloud.

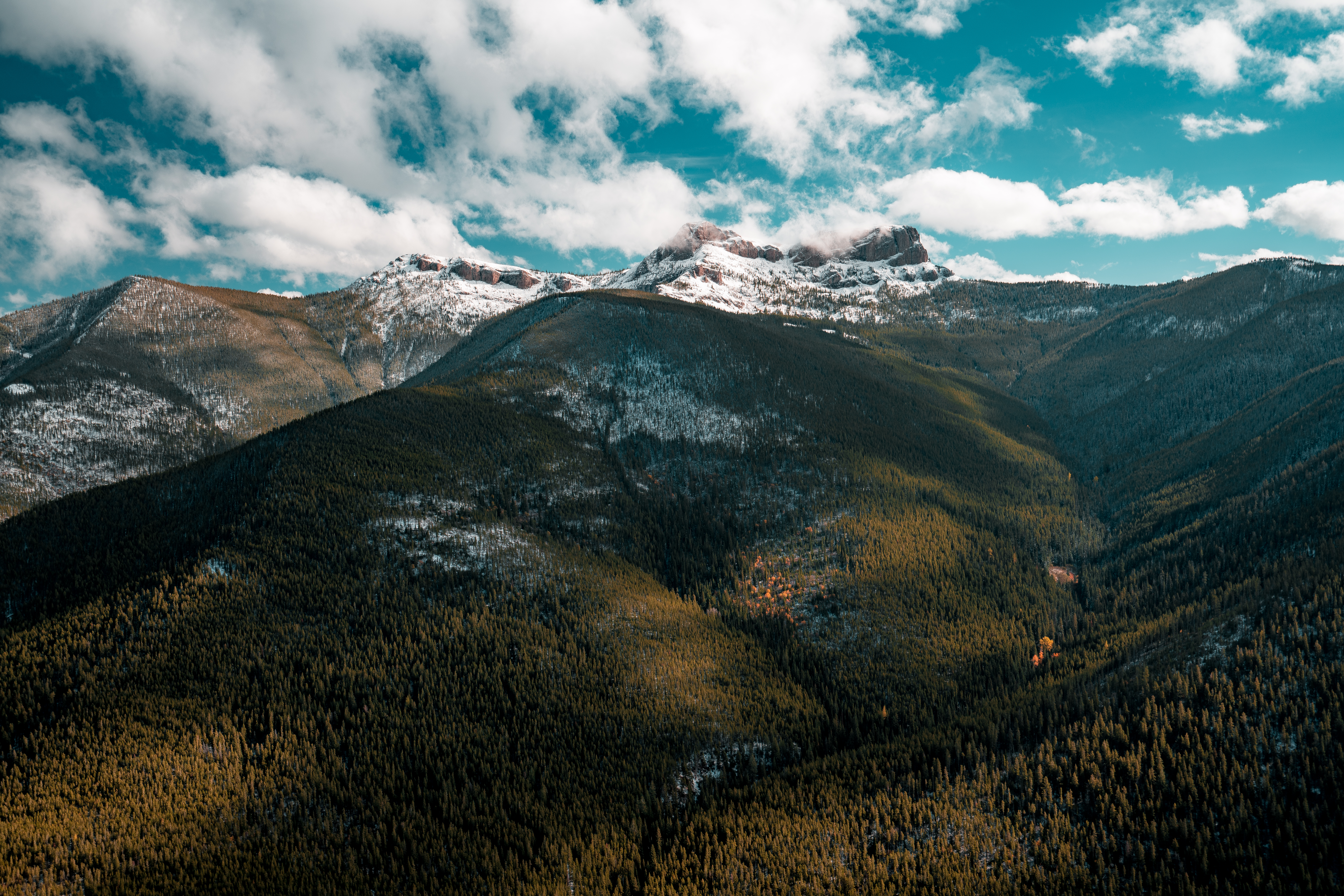

== See also ==
- Geology of the Rocky Mountains
