= Firefighter Mountain =

Mountain in Montana, United States of America

Coordinates: 48°19′58″N 113°52′40″W

Firefighter Mountain is a summit in Flathead County, Montana, in the United States. It is located within Flathead National Forest. With an elevation of 5,669 feet (1,728 m), Firefighter Mountain is the 2092nd highest summit in the state of Montana.
