= Argosy Mountain =

Mountain in Montana, United States

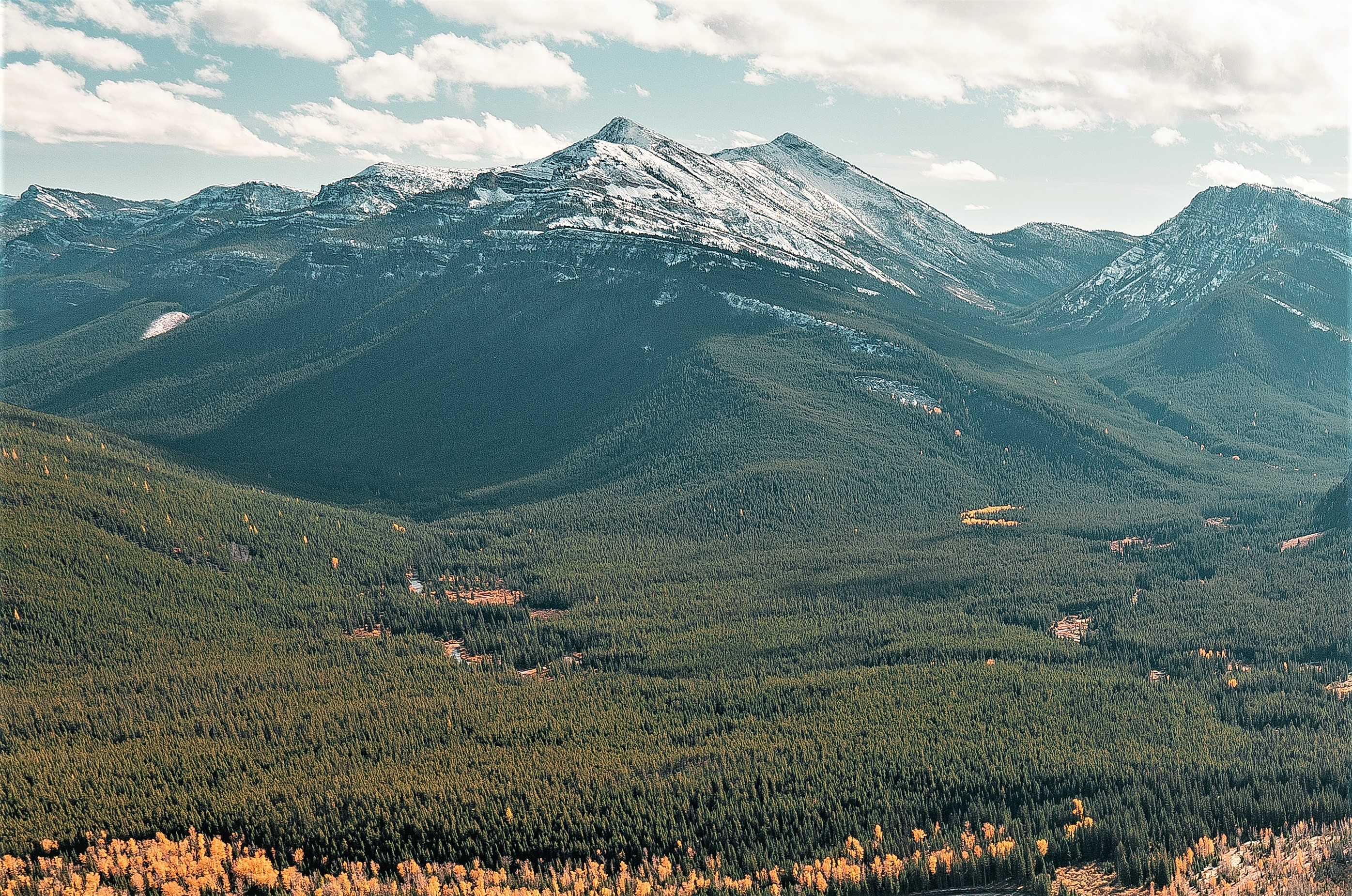
- Aerial view of north aspect

Highest point
- Elevation: 8,155 ft (2,486 m)
- Prominence: 1,395 ft (425 m)
- Parent peak: Pentagon Mountain (8,873 ft)
- Isolation: 4.51 mi (7.26 km)
- Coordinates: 48°00′12″N 113°14′23″W

Geography
- Location within Montana Location within the United States
- Location: Flathead County, Montana, U.S.
- Parent range: Rocky Mountains; Flathead Range
- Topo map: USGS Gable Peaks

Argosy Mountain is an 8,155-foot (2,486-metre) summit located in Flathead County of the U.S. state of Montana.

== Description ==
Argosy Mountain is located in the Flathead Range, a subset of the Rocky Mountains. It is situated in the Great Bear Wilderness, on land managed by Flathead National Forest. Precipitation runoff from the mountain drains north to the Middle Fork Flathead River via Roaring, Argosy, and Dolly Varden creeks. Topographic relief is significant as the summit rises 2,350 feet (720 meters) above Argosy Creek in one mile. The nearest higher neighbor is Trilobite Peak, 4.5 miles (7.2 km) to the east-southeast. Access to this remote peak is from the nearby Shafer Ranger Station at the Schafer landing strip which was grandfathered with the wilderness designation.

== Climate ==
Based on the Köppen climate classification, Argosy Mountain is located in a subarctic climate zone characterized by long, usually very cold winters, and short, cool to mild summers. Winter temperatures can drop below −10 °F with wind chill factors below −30 °F.

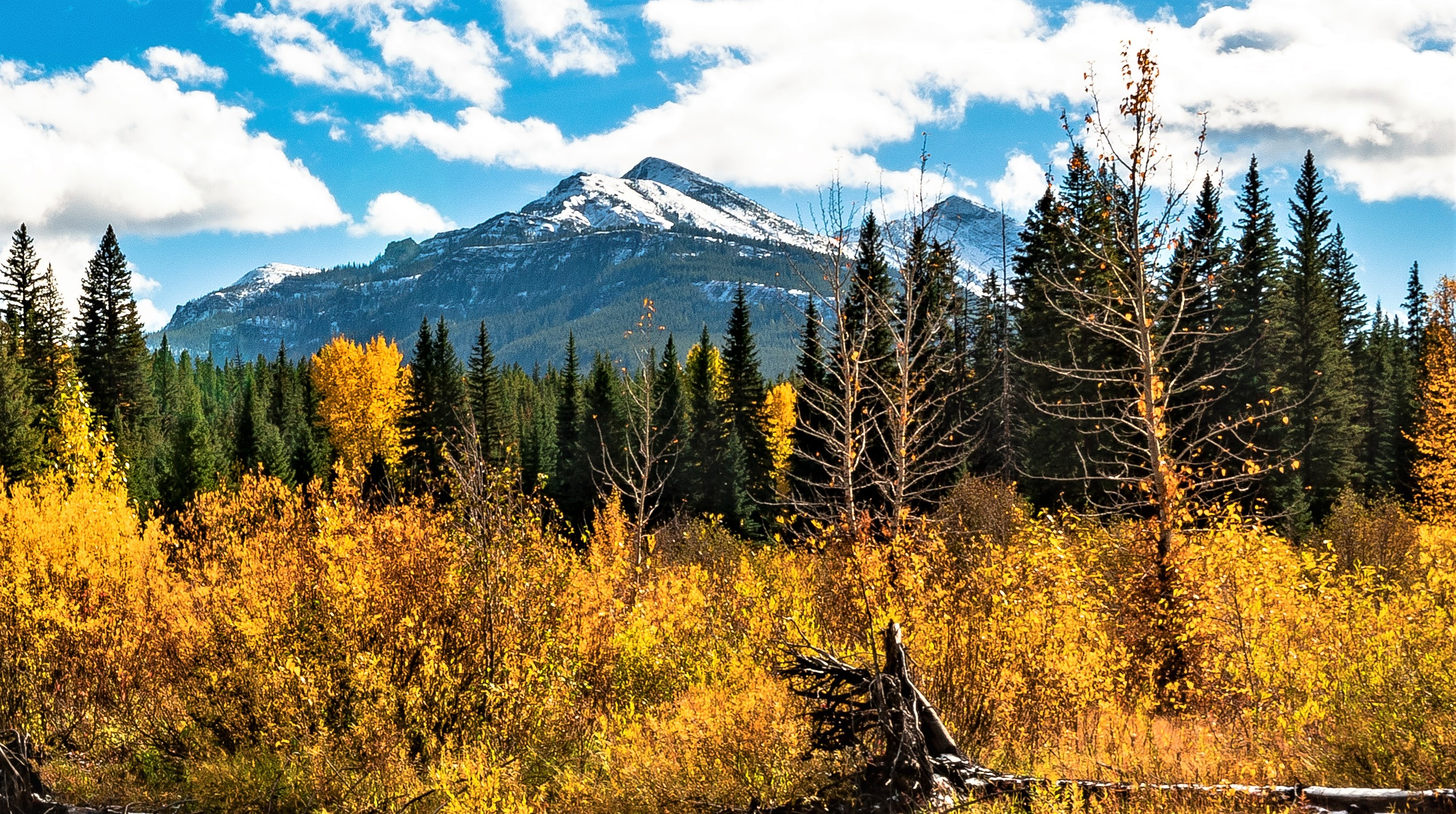
Argosy Mountain in autumn, summit right of center

== Geology ==
Argosy Mountain is composed of sedimentary rock laid down during the Precambrian to Jurassic periods. Formed in shallow seas, this sedimentary rock was initially uplifted beginning 170 million years ago when the Lewis Overthrust fault pushed an enormous slab of precambrian rocks 3 mi (4.8 km) thick, 50 miles (80 km) wide and 160 miles (260 km) long over younger rock of the cretaceous period.

== See also ==
- Geology of the Rocky Mountains
