= National Register of Historic Places listings in Glacier National Park =

This is a list of the National Register of Historic Places listings in Glacier National Park.

This is intended to be a complete list of the properties and districts on the National Register of Historic Places in Glacier National Park, United States. The locations of National Register properties and districts for which the latitude and longitude coordinates are included below, may be seen in a Google map.

There are 94 properties and districts listed on the National Register in the park, three of which are National Historic Landmarks.

There are more than 700 historic structures in the park, though. The National Park Service's "Ranger Melissa", host of Science Fridays series, introduces architectural historian Kim Hyatt, to introduce the topic and show a number of examples, in a 10 minute film available here or here. It starts with coverage of the Margaret McCarthy Homestead.

This National Park Service list is complete through NPS recent listings posted May 1, 2026.

== Current listings ==
| | Name on the Register | Image | Date listed | Location | City or town | Description |
|---|---|---|---|---|---|---|
| 1 | Apgar Fire Lookout | Apgar Fire Lookout | December 16, 1986 (#86003695) | Near Lake McDonald; 48°31′05″N 114°01′10″W | West Glacier | |
| 2 | Alice Beck Cabin | | December 26, 2008 (#08001219) | South of Kelly's Camp Rd. and east of McDonald Creek in Glacier National Park; 48°37′51″N 113°52′05″W | Lake McDonald | |
| 3 | Belly River Ranger Station Historic District | Belly River Ranger Station Historic District | February 14, 1986 (#86000329) | Head of Belly River Valley; 48°55′56″N 113°42′40″W | West Glacier | |
| 4 | Bowman Lake Patrol Cabin | Bowman Lake Patrol Cabin | February 14, 1986 (#86000340) | Lower end of Bowman Lake, ½ mile east of the Bowman Lake Ranger Station; 48°49′40″N 114°11′31″W | West Glacier | |
| 5 | Bowman Lake Road | Bowman Lake Road | January 19, 1996 (#95001565) | North Fork drainage between Polebridge and Bowman ranger stations in Glacier National Park; 48°49′39″N 114°12′08″W | West Glacier | |
| 6 | Bull Head Lodge and Studio | | February 6, 1984 (#84002465) | Off Going-to-the-Sun Road; 48°31′58″N 113°59′45″W | Apgar | Summer home of artist Charles M. Russell |
| 7 | Camas Creek Cutoff Road | Camas Creek Cutoff Road | July 11, 2014 (#14000393) | Glacier National Park; 48°32′26″N 114°00′01″W | West Glacier | |
| 8 | Cattle Queen Snowshoe Cabin | | July 1, 1999 (#99000778) | McDonald Subdistrict; 48°48′38″N 113°49′15″W | West Glacier | |
| 9 | Chief Mountain Border Station and Quarters | Chief Mountain Border Station and Quarters | May 20, 2008 (#06000744) | Montana Highway 17 at the Canada–US border in Glacier National Park; 48°59′48″N 113°39′33″W | Babb | |
| 10 | Coal Creek Patrol Cabin | Coal Creek Patrol Cabin | July 1, 1999 (#99000777) | U.S. Route 2; 48°25′00″N 113°38′56″W | West Glacier | |
| 11 | Cut Bank Ranger Station Historic District | Cut Bank Ranger Station Historic District | January 19, 1996 (#95001566) | Northern side of Cut Bank Creek in Glacier National Park; 48°36′22″N 113°22′34″W | East Glacier | |
| 12 | DESMET (Boat) | DESMET (Boat) | December 14, 2017 (#100001896) | Lake McDonald, Glacier National Park; 48°37′04″N 113°52′47″W | West Glacier | |
| 13 | Fielding Snowshoe Patrol Cabin | Fielding Snowshoe Patrol Cabin | February 14, 1986 (#86000341) | Off U.S. Route 2; 48°17′11″N 113°27′22″W | West Glacier | |
| 14 | Fish Creek Bay Boathouse | Fish Creek Bay Boathouse | January 19, 1996 (#95001567) | Fish Creek Campground on the western shore of Lake McDonald in Glacier National Park; 48°33′04″N 113°58′48″W | West Glacier | |
| 15 | Ford Creek Patrol Cabin | Ford Creek Patrol Cabin | February 14, 1986 (#86000342) | Glacier Route 7; 48°37′33″N 113°56′36″W | West Glacier | |
| 16 | Glacier National Park Tourist Trails-Inside Trail, South Circle, North Circle | Glacier National Park Tourist Trails-Inside Trail, South Circle, North Circle | January 19, 1996 (#95001579) | Inside Trail, South Circle and North Circle Trails; 48°41′41″N 113°33′46″W | St. Mary | |
| 17 | Goathaunt Bunkhouse | Goathaunt Bunkhouse | January 19, 1996 (#95001568) | Southern end of Waterton Lake in Glacier National Park; 48°57′39″N 113°53′53″W | St. Mary | |
| 18 | Going-to-the-Sun Road | Going-to-the-Sun Road | June 16, 1983 (#83001070) | Glacier Route 1; 48°38′48″N 113°46′48″W | West Glacier | Extends into Flathead County. National Historic Landmark. |
| 19 | Going-to-the-Sun Road | Going-to-the-Sun Road | February 18, 1997 (#83001070) | Glacier National Park; 48°38′01″N 113°47′15″W | West Glacier | Extends into Glacier County |
| 20 | Granite Park Chalet | Granite Park Chalet | June 27, 1983 (#83001060) | Glacier National Park; 48°46′12″N 113°46′11″W | West Glacier | |
| 21 | Great Northern Railway Buildings | Great Northern Railway Buildings | May 28, 1987 (#87001453) | Glacier National Park; 48°38′29″N 113°32′17″W | Glacier National Park | National Historic Landmark. |
| 22 | Greve's Tourist Cabins | Greve's Tourist Cabins | December 26, 2008 (#08001222) | Western side of Going-to-the-Sun Road in Glacier National Park; 48°37′25″N 113°52′16″W | Lake McDonald | |
| 23 | Gunsight Pass Shelter | Gunsight Pass Shelter | February 14, 1986 (#86000344) | Junction of Gunsight Pass Trail and the Continental Divide; 48°36′34″N 113°44′16″W | West Glacier | |
| 24 | Harrison Lake Patrol Cabin | Harrison Lake Patrol Cabin | February 16, 2001 (#01000116) | U.S. Route 2; 48°31′39″N 113°45′18″W | Glacier National Park | |
| 25 | Headquarters Historic District | Headquarters Historic District | January 19, 1996 (#95001569) | East of Glacier Route 1 at the crossing of the Middle Fork of the Flathead River in Glacier National Park; 48°30′06″N 113°58′47″W | West Glacier | |
| 26 | Heaven's Peak Fire Lookout | Heaven's Peak Fire Lookout | December 19, 1986 (#86003688) | Mount Cannon; 48°31′05″N 114°01′10″W | West Glacier | |
| 27 | Howes' Lake McDonald Cottage Sites Historic District | Howes' Lake McDonald Cottage Sites Historic District | December 26, 2008 (#08001223) | Northern side of Apgar Loop Rd. in Glacier National Park; 48°31′39″N 113°59′17″W | West Glacier | |
| 28 | Huckleberry Fire Outlook | Huckleberry Fire Outlook | February 14, 1986 (#86000346) | Summit of Huckleberry Mountain; 48°36′01″N 114°08′01″W | West Glacier | |
| 29 | Kelly's Camp Historic District | Kelly's Camp Historic District | December 23, 2009 (#08001224) | South of Kelly's Camp Rd. between Kelly's Creek and south of cabins in Glacier National Park; 48°37′36″N 113°54′06″W | Lake McDonald | |
| 30 | Kintla Lake Ranger Station | Kintla Lake Ranger Station | February 14, 1986 (#86000332) | Southern shore of Kintla Lake; 48°56′04″N 114°20′25″W | West Glacier | |
| 31 | Kishenehn Ranger Station Historic District | Kishenehn Ranger Station Historic District | February 14, 1986 (#86000335) | 3 miles south of the Canada–US border near the confluence of the northern fork of the Flathead River and Kishenehn Creek; 48°57′37″N 114°25′14″W | West Glacier | |
| 32 | Kootenai Creek Snowshoe Cabin | Kootenai Creek Snowshoe Cabin | July 1, 1999 (#99000775) | Flattop Mountain along Kootenai Creek; 48°51′55″N 113°54′28″W | St. Mary | |
| 33 | Lake McDonald Lodge Coffee Shop | Lake McDonald Lodge Coffee Shop | October 14, 2008 (#08001014) | Lake McDonald Lodge Boulevard; 48°37′04″N 113°52′35″W | Lake McDonald | |
| 34 | Lake McDonald Lodge | Lake McDonald Lodge | May 28, 1987 (#87001447) | Off Going-to-the-Sun Road; 48°37′02″N 113°52′41″W | West Glacier | National Historic Landmark. |
| 35 | Lake McDonald Lodge Historic District | Lake McDonald Lodge Historic District | May 22, 1978 (#78000280) | Off Going-to-the-Sun Road; 48°37′02″N 113°52′41″W | West Glacier | |
| 36 | Lee Creek Snowshoe Cabin | Lee Creek Snowshoe Cabin | March 2, 2001 (#01000203) | Northeastern corner of Glacier National Park; 48°59′10″N 113°37′20″W | Glacier National Park | |
| 37 | Lincoln Creek Snowshoe Cabin | | February 2, 2001 (#01000037) | U.S. Route 2; 48°29′53″N 113°52′41″W | West Glacier | |
| 38 | Little Chief (boat) | Little Chief (boat) | December 14, 2017 (#100001897) | Two Medicine Lake, Glacier National Park; 48°41′27″N 113°31′30″W | East Glacier Park vicinity | Duplicate listing for Rising Wolf, below. |
| 39 | Logan Creek Patrol Cabin | Logan Creek Patrol Cabin | February 14, 1986 (#86000348) | Eastern side of Going-to-the-Sun Road at the crossing of Logan Creek; 48°43′25″N 113°45′48″W | West Glacier | |
| 40 | Logan Pass Visitor Center | Logan Pass Visitor Center | April 15, 2008 (#08000334) | Going-to-the-Sun Rd., 18 miles west of U.S. Route 89; 48°41′43″N 113°43′04″W | St. Mary | |
| 41 | Logging Creek Ranger Station Historic District | Logging Creek Ranger Station Historic District | December 16, 1986 (#86003697) | Glacier Route 7 near Logging Creek; 48°41′51″N 114°11′34″W | West Glacier | |
| 42 | Loneman Fire Lookout | Loneman Fire Lookout | February 14, 1986 (#86000353) | Access via Loneman Mountain Trail; 48°29′21″N 113°46′04″W | West Glacier | |
| 43 | Lower Logging Lake Snowshoe Cabin and Boathouse | Lower Logging Lake Snowshoe Cabin and Boathouse | December 16, 1986 (#86003692) | Near the foot of Logging Lake; 48°44′26″N 114°07′47″W | West Glacier | |
| 44 | Lower Nyack Snowshoe Cabin | Lower Nyack Snowshoe Cabin | February 14, 1986 (#86000356) | Western side of Nyack Creek Trail; 48°29′47″N 113°41′16″W | West Glacier | |
| 45 | Lower Park Creek Patrol Cabin | Lower Park Creek Patrol Cabin | December 16, 1986 (#86003701) | Eastern side of Park Creek Trail past the crossing of Fielding-Coal Creek Trail; 48°20′08″N 113°32′37″W | West Glacier | |
| 46 | Margaret McCarthy Homestead | Margaret McCarthy Homestead | July 21, 1988 (#88001095) | Glacier National Park; 48°48′27″N 114°19′20″W | Big Prairie | Duplicate listing of McCarthy Homestead Cabin |
| 47 | McCarthy Homestead Cabin | McCarthy Homestead Cabin | December 16, 1986 (#86003691) | On the northern fork of the Flathead River; 48°48′27″N 114°19′21″W | West Glacier | Duplicate listing of Margaret McCarthy Homestead |
| 48 | Many Glacier Barn and Bunkhouse | Many Glacier Barn and Bunkhouse | January 19, 1996 (#95001570) | Glacier Route 3 at Apikuni Flat in Glacier National Park; 48°48′04″N 113°38′33″W | St. Mary | |
| 49 | Many Glacier Campground Camptender's Cabin | Many Glacier Campground Camptender's Cabin | January 19, 1996 (#95001571) | Many Glacier in Glacier National Park; 48°47′49″N 113°40′37″W | St. Mary | |
| 50 | Many Glacier Hotel Historic District | Many Glacier Hotel Historic District | January 19, 1996 (#76000173) | West of Babb; 48°47′54″N 113°39′12″W | Babb | |
| 51 | J.K. Miller Homestead | J.K. Miller Homestead | July 21, 1988 (#88001092) | Glacier National Park; 48°50′11″N 114°19′44″W | Big Prairie | |
| 52 | Morning Eagle (carvel-planked wooden vessel) | Morning Eagle (carvel-planked wooden vessel) | July 23, 2018 (#100002691) | Josephine L., Glacier NP; 48°47′15″N 113°40′10″W | Babb | part of the Glacier National Park MRA |
| 53 | Mount Brown Fire Lookout | Mount Brown Fire Lookout | December 16, 1986 (#86003693) | Off Route 1 near Snyder Lake; 48°37′44″N 113°49′58″W | West Glacier | |
| 54 | North Fork Road | North Fork Road | January 19, 1996 (#95001572) | North Fork drainage, Fish Creek to Kintla Lake in Glacier National Park; 48°32′53″N 113°59′11″W | West Glacier | |
| 55 | Numa Ridge Fire Lookout | Numa Ridge Fire Lookout | February 14, 1986 (#86000357) | Near Bowman Lake; 48°53′01″N 114°10′43″W | West Glacier | |
| 56 | Nyack Ranger Station Historic District | Nyack Ranger Station Historic District | February 14, 1986 (#86000359) | Nyack Ranger Station; 48°26′24″N 113°47′43″W | West Glacier | |
| 57 | Pass Creek Snowshoe Cabin | Pass Creek Snowshoe Cabin | December 19, 1986 (#86003689) | Confluence of the Waterton River and Pass Creek; 48°53′47″N 113°54′23″W | West Glacier | |
| 58 | Polebridge Ranger Station Historic District | Polebridge Ranger Station Historic District | February 14, 1986 (#86000337) | Near the northeastern end of Henshaw Bridge on Route 7; 48°46′56″N 114°16′43″W | West Glacier | |
| 59 | Polebridge to Numa Ridge Phoneline | Polebridge to Numa Ridge Phoneline | April 4, 1996 (#95001573) | North Fork drainage, Polebridge to Numa Ridge in Glacier National Park; 48°49′59″N 114°13′10″W | West Glacier | |
| 60 | Ptarmigan Tunnel | Ptarmigan Tunnel | February 14, 1986 (#86000360) | North of Ptarmigan Lake; 48°51′13″N 113°42′24″W | West Glacier | |
| 61 | Quartz Lake Patrol Cabin | Quartz Lake Patrol Cabin | February 14, 1986 (#86000361) | Foot of Quartz Lake; 48°49′19″N 114°08′05″W | West Glacier | |
| 62 | William Raftery Homestead | | July 21, 1988 (#88001099) | Glacier National Park; 48°48′34″N 114°17′30″W | Big Prairie | |
| 63 | Rising Sun Auto Camp | Rising Sun Auto Camp | January 19, 1996 (#95001574) | 500 feet north of Going-to-the-Sun Rd. at St. Mary Lake in Glacier National Park; 48°41′46″N 113°31′06″W | St. Mary | |
| 64 | Rising Wolf | Rising Wolf | November 14, 2016 (#16000772) | Glacier National Park; 48°41′27″N 113°31′30″W | St. Mary | 1926 boat plying St. Mary Lake, now called Little Chief. Duplicate listing above under "Little Chief". |
| 65 | Roes Creek Campground Camptender's Cabin | Roes Creek Campground Camptender's Cabin | April 4, 1996 (#95001575) | North of Going-to-the-Sun Rd. at St. Mary Lake in Glacier National Park; 48°41′39″N 113°31′13″W | St. Mary | |
| 66 | Saint Mary Ranger Station | Saint Mary Ranger Station | February 14, 1986 (#86000367) | Eastern end of Upper Saint Mary Lake; 48°44′16″N 113°25′40″W | West Glacier | |
| 67 | St. Mary Utility Area Historic District | St. Mary Utility Area Historic District | January 19, 1996 (#95001576) | East of St. Mary at Divide Creek in Glacier National Park; 48°44′17″N 113°25′45″W | St. Mary | |
| 68 | Saint Mary Visitor Center, Entrance Station and Checking Stations | Saint Mary Visitor Center, Entrance Station and Checking Stations | April 15, 2008 (#08000335) | Going-to-the-Sun Rd., 5 miles east of U.S. Route 89; 48°44′30″N 113°26′21″W | St. Mary | |
| 69 | Scalplock Mountain Fire Lookout | | February 14, 1986 (#86000363) | Accessible by trail connecting to Boundary Trail near the Walton Ranger Station; 48°18′01″N 113°34′24″W | West Glacier | |
| 70 | Anton Schoenberger Homestead | | July 21, 1988 (#88001094) | Glacier National Park; 48°48′34″N 114°17′30″W | Big Prairie | |
| 71 | Charlie Schoenberger Homestead | | July 21, 1988 (#88001093) | Glacier National Park; 48°48′31″N 114°19′23″W | Big Prairie | |
| 72 | Sherburne Ranger Station Historic District | Sherburne Ranger Station Historic District | December 16, 1986 (#86003698) | Glacier Route 3 near Glacier Entrance; 48°49′19″N 113°34′45″W | West Glacier | |
| 73 | Sherwood Lodge | | December 26, 2008 (#08001226) | Grist Rd. in Glacier National Park; 48°32′11″N 113°59′45″W | West Glacier | |
| 74 | Skyland Camp-Bowman Lake Ranger Station | Skyland Camp-Bowman Lake Ranger Station | February 14, 1986 (#86000365) | Southwestern shore of Bowman Lake; 48°49′44″N 114°12′13″W | West Glacier | |
| 75 | Slide Lake-Otatso Creek Patrol Cabin and Woodshed | Slide Lake-Otatso Creek Patrol Cabin and Woodshed | February 14, 1986 (#86000370) | Northern side of Otatso Creek; 48°54′36″N 113°35′56″W | West Glacier | |
| 76 | Sperry Chalet | Sperry Chalet | August 2, 1977 (#77000115) | East of West Glacier; 48°36′16″N 113°47′03″W | West Glacier | Destroyed by forest fire August 31, 2017 |
| 77 | Stillwater Ranger Station Historic District | Stillwater Ranger Station Historic District | July 8, 1981 (#81000340) | U.S. Route 93; 48°32′33″N 114°34′03″W | Olney | |
| 78 | Sun Camp Fireguard Cabin | Sun Camp Fireguard Cabin | July 1, 1999 (#99000776) | Going-to-the-Sun Rd. 48°41′11″N 113°35′13″W | St. Mary | |
| 79 | Swanson Boathouse | Swanson Boathouse | January 19, 1996 (#95001577) | Eastern shore of Two Medicine Lake in Glacier National Park; 48°28′59″N 113°22′07″W | East Glacier | |
| 80 | Swiftcurrent Auto Camp Historic District | Swiftcurrent Auto Camp Historic District | January 19, 1996 (#95001578) | Western end of Glacier Route 3 in Glacier National Park; 48°47′54″N 113°40′33″W | Many Glacier | |
| 81 | Swiftcurrent Fire Lookout | Swiftcurrent Fire Lookout | December 16, 1986 (#86003694) | Near the Continental Garden Wall in the vicinity of Swiftcurrent Mountain; 48°47′08″N 113°45′58″W | West Glacier | |
| 82 | Swiftcurrent Ranger Station Historic District | Swiftcurrent Ranger Station Historic District | December 19, 1986 (#86003690) | Off Route 3 near Swiftcurrent Lake; 48°47′48″N 113°40′26″W | West Glacier | |
| 83 | Two Medicine Campground Camptender's Cabin | Two Medicine Campground Camptender's Cabin | January 19, 1996 (#95001580) | Two Medicine Lake in Glacier National Park; 48°29′18″N 113°21′54″W | East Glacier | |
| 84 | Two Medicine General Store | Two Medicine General Store | February 14, 1986 (#86000372) | Eastern shore of Two Medicine Lake; 48°29′06″N 113°22′08″W | West Glacier | |
| 85 | Upper Kintla Lake Patrol Cabin | Upper Kintla Lake Patrol Cabin | February 14, 1986 (#86000374) | Head of Kintla Lake; 48°58′38″N 114°14′47″W | West Glacier | |
| 86 | Upper Lake McDonald Ranger Station Historic District | Upper Lake McDonald Ranger Station Historic District | December 16, 1986 (#86003699) | Northern shore of Lake McDonald; 48°38′23″N 113°52′21″W | West Glacier | |
| 87 | Upper Logging Lake Snowshoe Cabin | Upper Logging Lake Snowshoe Cabin | February 14, 1986 (#86000376) | Near the head of Logging Lake; 48°46′36″N 114°01′22″W | West Glacier | |
| 88 | Upper Nyack Snowshoe Cabin | Upper Nyack Snowshoe Cabin | February 14, 1986 (#86000377) | Northern side of Nyack Creek; 48°32′52″N 113°34′00″W | West Glacier | |
| 89 | Upper Park Creek Patrol Cabin | Upper Park Creek Patrol Cabin | December 16, 1986 (#86003702) | Junction of Park Creek and Two Medicine Pass Trails; 48°24′54″N 113°27′34″W | West Glacier | |
| 90 | Johnnie Walsh's Guest Lodge | | July 21, 1988 (#88001096) | Glacier National Park; 48°48′14″N 114°19′02″W | Big Prairie | |
| 91 | Johnnie Walsh Homestead | | July 21, 1988 (#88001098) | Glacier National Park; 48°48′29″N 114°18′26″W | Big Prairie | |
| 92 | Walton Ranger Station Historic District | Walton Ranger Station Historic District | December 16, 1986 (#86003700) | U.S. Route 2 near Essex; 48°16′25″N 113°36′08″W | West Glacier | |
| 93 | West Entrance Station | West Entrance Station | April 4, 1996 (#95001581) | Going-to-the-Sun Road, near West Glacier in Glacier National Park; 48°30′23″N 113°59′12″W | West Glacier | |
| 94 | Burton and Lulu Wheeler Cabin | Burton and Lulu Wheeler Cabin | November 27, 1998 (#98001527) | Northern end of Lake McDonald; 48°38′25″N 113°53′00″W | Apgar | Boundary increase listed October 24, 2008 |

== See also ==
- National Register of Historic Places listings in Flathead County, Montana
- National Register of Historic Places listings in Glacier County, Montana
- List of National Historic Landmarks in Montana
- National Register of Historic Places listings in Montana
