= National Register of Historic Places listings in Flathead County, Montana =

Location of Flathead County in Montana

This is a list of the National Register of Historic Places listings in Flathead County, Montana.

This is intended to be a complete list of the properties and districts on the National Register of Historic Places in Flathead County, Montana, United States. The locations of National Register properties and districts for which the latitude and longitude coordinates are included below, may be seen in a map.

There are 149 properties and districts listed on the National Register in the county, including 3 National Historic Landmarks.

This National Park Service list is complete through NPS recent listings posted May 1, 2026.

== Current listings ==
	Name on the Register	Image	Date listed	Location	City or town	Description
1	W.L. Adair General Mercantile Historic District	W.L. Adair General Mercantile Historic District	February 6, 1986 (#86000155)	On Polebridge Loop Rd., 0.25 miles (0.40 km) east of its intersection with North Fork Road; 48°45′43″N 114°17′01″W	Polebridge	
2	Alexander and Busey Houses	Alexander and Busey Houses	August 24, 1994 (#94000869)	106 and 112 5th Ave., W. 48°11′45″N 114°19′18″W	Kalispell	#106 has been demolished.
3	Anderson Style Shop	Anderson Style Shop	August 24, 1994 (#94000870)	222 Main St. 48°11′46″N 114°18′44″W	Kalispell	
4	Apgar Fire Lookout	Apgar Fire Lookout	December 16, 1986 (#86003695)	Near Lake McDonald; 48°31′05″N 114°01′10″W	West Glacier	
5	Bader-Jaquette and Westwang Houses and Rental Property	Bader-Jaquette and Westwang Houses and Rental Property	August 24, 1994 (#94000871)	46 and 36 5th Ave. W. 48°11′48″N 114°19′14″W	Kalispell	
6	Beaman House	Beaman House	August 24, 1994 (#94000872)	230 4th Ave., W. 48°11′43″N 114°19′05″W	Kalispell	
7	Alice Beck Cabin		December 26, 2008 (#08001219)	South of Kelly's Camp Rd. and east of McDonald Creek in Glacier National Park; 48°37′51″N 113°52′05″W	Lake McDonald	
8	Belton Chalets	Belton Chalets	November 15, 1978 (#78001685)	U.S. Route 2; 48°29′48″N 113°58′32″W	West Glacier	
9	Big Creek Ranger Station Historic District		January 7, 2015 (#14001126)	North Fork Rd. 48°36′06″N 114°09′58″W	Polebridge	Flathead National Forest
10	Billsborough House	Billsborough House	August 24, 1994 (#94000873)	376 6th Ave., E., N. 48°12′19″N 114°18′22″W	Kalispell	
11	Charles Boles House	Charles Boles House	February 14, 2006 (#06000041)	40 Appleway Dr. 48°11′50″N 114°20′05″W	Kalispell	
12	Bowman Lake Patrol Cabin	Bowman Lake Patrol Cabin	February 14, 1986 (#86000340)	Lower end of Bowman Lake, 0.5 miles (0.80 km) east of the Bowman Lake Ranger Station; 48°49′40″N 114°11′31″W	West Glacier	
13	Bowman Lake Road	Bowman Lake Road	January 19, 1996 (#95001565)	North Fork drainage between Polebridge and Bowman ranger stations in Glacier National Park; 48°49′39″N 114°12′08″W	West Glacier	
14	Boyd's Shop	Boyd's Shop	August 24, 1994 (#94000874)	227 1st. St., W. 48°11′50″N 114°18′58″W	Kalispell	Established as a blacksmith shop in the 1910s. Later shifted to welding.
15	Brice Apartments	Brice Apartments	August 24, 1994 (#94000875)	228 2nd Ave., E. 48°11′47″N 114°18′38″W	Kalispell	
16	Bruyer Granary	Bruyer Granary	October 12, 2006 (#06000937)	1355 Whitefish Stage Rd. 48°13′41″N 114°18′23″W	Kalispell	
17	Bull Head Lodge and Studio		February 6, 1984 (#84002465)	Off Going-to-the-Sun Road; 48°31′58″N 113°59′45″W	Glacier National Park	Summer home of artist Charles M. Russell
18	Camas Creek Cutoff Road	Camas Creek Cutoff Road	July 11, 2014 (#14000393)	Glacier National Park; 48°32′26″N 114°00′01″W	West Glacier	
19	Cattle Queen Snowshoe Cabin		July 1, 1999 (#99000778)	McDonald Subdistrict; 48°48′38″N 113°49′15″W	West Glacier	
20	City Water Department	City Water Department	August 24, 1994 (#94000876)	336 1st Ave., E. 48°11′44″N 114°18′37″W	Kalispell	1927 Georgian Revival office building, designed by Kalispell architect Fred Brinkman.
21	Coal Creek Patrol Cabin	Coal Creek Patrol Cabin	July 1, 1999 (#99000777)	U.S. Route 2; 48°25′00″N 113°38′56″W	West Glacier	
22	C. E. Conrad Memorial Cemetery	C. E. Conrad Memorial Cemetery	December 5, 2012 (#12000995)	641 Conrad Dr. 48°12′12″N 114°17′20″W	Kalispell	
23	Charles E. Conrad Mansion	Charles E. Conrad Mansion	February 20, 1975 (#75001083)	313 6th Ave., E. 48°11′49″N 114°18′08″W	Kalispell	The Shingle-styled mansion was designed by Kirtland Cutter and built in 1895 for businessman Conrad.
24	Continental Oil Company Filling Station		August 24, 1994 (#94000877)	35 1st Ave., N. 48°11′53″N 114°18′39″W	Kalispell	Demolished
25	Continental Oil Company Warehouse and Garage	Continental Oil Company Warehouse and Garage	August 24, 1994 (#94000878)	51 1st Ave., W., N. 48°12′00″N 114°18′53″W	Kalispell	
26	Courthouse Historic District	Courthouse Historic District	August 24, 1994 (#94000879)	500-800 blocks of Main St. 48°11′29″N 114°18′37″W	Kalispell	
27	A. J. Dean House	A. J. Dean House	August 11, 1980 (#80002415)	244 Woodland Ave. 48°11′46″N 114°18′12″W	Kalispell	
28	DESMET (Boat)	DESMET (Boat)	December 14, 2017 (#100001896)	Lake McDonald, Glacier National Park; 48°37′04″N 113°52′47″W	West Glacier	
29	East Side Historic District	East Side Historic District	August 24, 1994 (#94000880)	Roughly bounded by Central St., E., Woodland Park, Woodland Ave., 13th St., E., and 1st Ave., E. 48°11′43″N 114°18′16″W	Kalispell	Various businesses, institutions and residences built as early as the 1890s.;
30	Equity Supply Company Elevator and Creamery		August 24, 1994 (#94000881)	50 1st Ave., W., N. 48°12′00″N 114°18′57″W	Kalispell	Demolished
31	Federal Building	Federal Building	August 24, 1994 (#94000882)	247 1st Ave., E. 48°11′47″N 114°18′36″W	Kalispell	Now the local library
32	Ferguson House	Ferguson House	August 24, 1994 (#94000883)	320 4th Ave., W. 48°12′19″N 114°19′02″W	Kalispell	The Ferguson House is an American Foursquare cottage with Queen Anne stylings, built in 1897 by Ferguson, a boilermaker for the Great Northern Railway.
33	Fielding Snowshoe Patrol Cabin	Fielding Snowshoe Patrol Cabin	February 14, 1986 (#86000341)	Off U.S. Route 2; 48°17′11″N 113°27′22″W	West Glacier	
34	First Presbyterian Church of Whitefish	First Presbyterian Church of Whitefish	October 1, 2004 (#04001085)	301 Central Ave. 48°24′33″N 114°20′08″W	Whitefish	
35	Fish Creek Bay Boathouse	Fish Creek Bay Boathouse	January 19, 1996 (#95001567)	Fish Creek Campground on the western shore of Lake McDonald in Glacier National Park; 48°33′04″N 113°58′48″W	West Glacier	
36	Fisher House	Fisher House	August 25, 1994 (#94000884)	441 2nd St., W. 48°11′45″N 114°19′05″W	Kalispell	
37	Flathead National Forest Backcountry Administrative Facilities		December 17, 2014 (#14001047)	Flathead National Forest; 48°09′25″N 113°40′09″W	Hungry Horse	Discontiguous district encompassing backcountry ranger stations and other infrastructure in the Great Bear Wilderness and Bob Marshall Wilderness
38	Flathead River Bridge	Flathead River Bridge	June 17, 2010 (#10000183)	South end of 4th Ave. 48°21′43″N 114°11′02″W	Columbia Falls	
39	Flathead Wholesale Grocery	Flathead Wholesale Grocery	August 22, 1994 (#94000885)	5 1st Ave., E. 48°11′57″N 114°18′40″W	Kalispell	
40	Ford Creek Patrol Cabin	Ford Creek Patrol Cabin	February 14, 1986 (#86000342)	Glacier Route 7; 48°37′33″N 113°56′36″W	West Glacier	
41	Ford Schoolhouse		August 23, 2022 (#100008041)	North Fork Rd. just over nine miles northwest of Polebridge; 48°52′41″N 114°22′39″W	Polebridge vicinity	
42	Edward Gay House	Edward Gay House	August 24, 1994 (#94000886)	236 5th Ave., W. 48°11′41″N 114°19′11″W	Kalispell	
43	Gibson-Lebert House	Gibson-Lebert House	August 24, 1994 (#94000887)	461 E. California St. 48°12′23″N 114°18′34″W	Kalispell	
44	Going-to-the-Sun Road	Going-to-the-Sun Road	June 16, 1983 (#83001070)	Glacier Route 1; 48°38′48″N 113°46′48″W	West Glacier	
45	Going-to-the-Sun Road	Going-to-the-Sun Road	February 18, 1997 (#97000345)	Glacier National Park; 48°38′01″N 113°47′15″W	West Glacier	Extends into Glacier County
46	Graham House	Graham House	August 24, 1994 (#94000888)	825 6th Ave., E. 48°11′31″N 114°18′03″W	Kalispell	
47	Granite Park Chalet	Granite Park Chalet	June 27, 1983 (#83001060)	Glacier National Park; 48°46′12″N 113°46′11″W	West Glacier	
48	Great Northern Railway Buildings	Great Northern Railway Buildings	May 28, 1987 (#87001453)	Glacier National Park; 48°38′29″N 113°32′17″W	Glacier National Park	
49	Great Northern Railway Depot	Great Northern Railway Depot	August 24, 1994 (#94000889)	15 Depot Loop; 48°11′58″N 114°18′44″W	Kalispell	
50	Great Northern Railway Passenger and Freight Depot and Division Office	Great Northern Railway Passenger and Freight Depot and Division Office	July 11, 2002 (#02000766)	500 Depot St. 48°24′48″N 114°20′04″W	Whitefish	
51	Gregg-Moses House	Gregg-Moses House	August 24, 1994 (#94000890)	27 8th Ave., W. 48°11′46″N 114°19′19″W	Kalispell	
52	Greve's Tourist Cabins	Greve's Tourist Cabins	December 26, 2008 (#08001222)	Western side of Going-to-the-Sun Road in Glacier National Park; 48°37′25″N 113°52′16″W	Lake McDonald	
53	Gunsight Pass Shelter	Gunsight Pass Shelter	February 14, 1986 (#86000344)	Junction of Gunsight Pass Trail and the Continental Divide; 48°36′34″N 113°44′16″W	West Glacier	
54	Harrison Lake Patrol Cabin	Harrison Lake Patrol Cabin	February 16, 2001 (#01000116)	U.S. Route 2; 48°31′39″N 113°45′18″W	Glacier National Park	
55	Headquarters Historic District	Headquarters Historic District	January 19, 1996 (#95001569)	East of Glacier Route 1 at the crossing of the Middle Fork of the Flathead River in Glacier National Park; 48°30′06″N 113°58′47″W	West Glacier	
56	Heaven's Peak Fire Lookout	Heaven's Peak Fire Lookout	December 19, 1986 (#86003688)	Mount Cannon; 48°31′05″N 114°01′10″W	West Glacier	
57	Cornelius Hedges Elementary School	Cornelius Hedges Elementary School	June 29, 1989 (#89000765)	827 4th Ave., E. 48°11′30″N 114°18′10″W	Kalispell	
58	Heller Building	Heller Building	March 22, 1991 (#91000332)	140 Main St. 48°11′50″N 114°18′45″W	Kalispell	
59	Hodgson House	Hodgson House	August 24, 1994 (#94000891)	314 9th Ave., W. 48°11′41″N 114°19′30″W	Kalispell	
60	Hornet Lookout	Hornet Lookout	August 19, 1983 (#83001061)	Hornet Mountain; 48°52′47″N 114°30′42″W	Flathead National Forest	
61	Hotel Norden	Hotel Norden	August 24, 1994 (#94000892)	24 1st Ave., W. 48°11′52″N 114°18′52″W	Kalispell	
62	Houtz House	Houtz House	August 24, 1994 (#94000893)	822 5th Ave., W. 48°11′21″N 114°19′03″W	Kalispell	
63	Howes' Lake McDonald Cottage Sites Historic District	Howes' Lake McDonald Cottage Sites Historic District	December 26, 2008 (#08001223)	Northern side of Apgar Loop Rd. in Glacier National Park; 48°31′39″N 113°59′17″W	West Glacier	
64	Huckleberry Fire Outlook	Huckleberry Fire Outlook	February 14, 1986 (#86000346)	Summit of Huckleberry Mountain; 48°36′01″N 114°08′01″W	West Glacier	
65	Izaak Walton Inn	Izaak Walton Inn	October 18, 1985 (#85003235)	Off U.S. Route 2 adjacent to the railroad line in Essex; 48°16′43″N 113°36′41″W	Essex	
66	Johnson-Lee House	Johnson-Lee House	August 24, 1994 (#94000894)	651 2nd Ave., W., N. 48°12′20″N 114°19′06″W	Kalispell	
67	Kalispell Flour Mill	Kalispell Flour Mill	August 24, 1994 (#94000896)	506 W. Center St. 48°11′51″N 114°19′20″W	Kalispell	
68	Kalispell Main Street Historic District	Kalispell Main Street Historic District	August 24, 1994 (#94000904)	34-343 Main St. and 116-142 1st Ave., E.; also roughly bounded by Center St. to the north, 5th St. to the south, and the north and south running alleys to the west of Main St. 48°11′48″N 114°18′42″W	Kalispell	Second set of boundaries represents a boundary increase of September 3, 2010
69	Kalispell Monumental Company	Kalispell Monumental Company	August 24, 1994 (#94000898)	7 1st Ave., E. 48°11′55″N 114°18′40″W	Kalispell	
70	Kalispell-American Laundry	Kalispell-American Laundry	August 24, 1994 (#94000895)	121 1st Ave., E. 48°11′51″N 114°18′38″W	Kalispell	
71	Kearney Rapids Bridge		July 22, 1994 (#94000734)	Bigfork Canyon Rd. 48°03′22″N 114°01′43″W	Bigfork	Replaced
72	Harry C. Keith House	Harry C. Keith House	July 16, 1987 (#87001198)	538 5th Ave., E 48°11′40″N 114°18′14″W	Kalispell	
73	Kelly's Camp Historic District	Kelly's Camp Historic District	December 23, 2009 (#08001224)	South of Kelly's Camp Rd. between Kelly's Creek and south of cabins in Glacier National Park; 48°37′37″N 113°54′09″W	Lake McDonald	
74	Kerr House	Kerr House	August 24, 1994 (#94000899)	136 5th Ave., W. 48°11′41″N 114°19′12″W	Kalispell	
75	Kintla Lake Ranger Station	Kintla Lake Ranger Station	February 14, 1986 (#86000332)	Southern shore of Kintla Lake; 48°56′04″N 114°20′25″W	West Glacier	
76	Kishenehn Ranger Station Historic District	Kishenehn Ranger Station Historic District	February 14, 1986 (#86000335)	3 miles (4.8 km) south of the Canada–US border near the confluence of the northern fork of the Flathead River and Kishenehn Creek; 48°57′37″N 114°25′14″W	West Glacier	
77	Billy Kruse Cabin		October 28, 2021 (#100007131)	15920 North Fork Rd. 48°56′38″N 114°27′18″W	Polebridge vicinity	
78	Lake McDonald Lodge Coffee Shop	Lake McDonald Lodge Coffee Shop	October 14, 2008 (#08001014)	Lake McDonald Lodge Boulevard; 48°37′04″N 113°52′35″W	Lake McDonald	
79	Lake McDonald Lodge	Lake McDonald Lodge	May 22, 1978 (#78000280)	Off Going-to-the-Sun Road; 48°37′02″N 113°52′41″W	West Glacier	Designated a National Historic Landmark District in 1987
80	Leibig House	Leibig House	August 24, 1994 (#94000900)	396 4th Ave., E., N. 48°12′17″N 114°18′32″W	Kalispell	
81	Lincoln Creek Snowshoe Cabin		February 2, 2001 (#01000037)	U.S. Route 2; 48°29′53″N 113°52′41″W	West Glacier	
82	Lockridge Medical Clinic	Lockridge Medical Clinic	August 14, 2012 (#12000789)	341 Central Ave. 48°43′25″N 113°45′48″W	Whitefish	designed by Frank Lloyd Wright in 1958
83	Logan Creek Patrol Cabin	Logan Creek Patrol Cabin	February 14, 1986 (#86000348)	Eastern side of Going-to-the-Sun Road at the crossing of Logan Creek; 48°43′25″N 113°45′48″W	West Glacier	
84	Logging Creek Ranger Station Historic District	Logging Creek Ranger Station Historic District	December 16, 1986 (#86003697)	Glacier Route 7 near Logging Creek; 48°41′51″N 114°11′34″W	West Glacier	
85	Loneman Fire Lookout	Loneman Fire Lookout	February 14, 1986 (#86000353)	Access via Loneman Mountain Trail; 48°29′21″N 113°46′04″W	West Glacier	
86	Long House	Long House	August 24, 1994 (#94000901)	393 8th Ave., E., N. 48°12′21″N 114°18′10″W	Kalispell	
87	Lower Logging Lake Snowshoe Cabin and Boathouse	Lower Logging Lake Snowshoe Cabin and Boathouse	December 16, 1986 (#86003692)	Near the foot of Logging Lake; 48°44′26″N 114°07′46″W	West Glacier	
88	Lower Nyack Snowshoe Cabin	Lower Nyack Snowshoe Cabin	February 14, 1986 (#86000356)	Western side of Nyack Creek Trail; 48°29′47″N 113°41′16″W	West Glacier	
89	Lower Park Creek Patrol Cabin	Lower Park Creek Patrol Cabin	December 16, 1986 (#86003701)	Eastern side of Park Creek Trail past the crossing of Fielding-Coal Creek Trail; 48°20′08″N 113°32′37″W	West Glacier	
90	McCarthy-Pederson Farm Historic District	McCarthy-Pederson Farm Historic District	December 18, 2006 (#06001188)	820 Riverside Rd. 48°09′48″N 114°08′07″W	Kalispell	
91	McCarthy Homestead Cabin	McCarthy Homestead Cabin	December 16, 1986 (#86003691)	On the northern fork of the Flathead River; 48°48′27″N 114°19′21″W	West Glacier	Duplicate of Margaret McCarthy Homestead
92	Margaret McCarthy Homestead	Margaret McCarthy Homestead	July 21, 1988 (#88001095)	Glacier National Park; 48°48′27″N 114°19′20″W	Big Prairie	Duplicate of McCarthy Homestead Cabin
93	McGee House	McGee House	August 24, 1994 (#94000903)	454 1st Ave., E., N. 48°12′16″N 114°18′48″W	Kalispell	
94	McMannamy House and Rental Properties	McMannamy House and Rental Properties	August 24, 1994 (#94000902)	1020 5th Ave., W., 1004, 1012 and 1020½ 5th Ave. W., and 508 and 516 10th St., W. 48°11′14″N 114°19′00″W	Kalispell	
95	J.K. Miller Homestead	J.K. Miller Homestead	July 21, 1988 (#88001092)	Glacier National Park; 48°50′11″N 114°19′44″W	Big Prairie	
96	Mount Brown Fire Lookout	Mount Brown Fire Lookout	December 16, 1986 (#86003693)	Off Route 1 near Snyder Lake; 48°37′44″N 113°49′58″W	West Glacier	
97	Mountain Brook School	Mountain Brook School	March 16, 2026 (#100012817)	2353 Foothill Road; 48°11′59″N 114°04′21″W	Kalispell vicinity	
98	North Fork Road	North Fork Road	January 19, 1996 (#95001572)	North Fork drainage, Fish Creek to Kintla Lake in Glacier National Park; 48°32′53″N 113°59′11″W	West Glacier	
99	Norwegian Evangelical Lutheran Church and Parsonage	Norwegian Evangelical Lutheran Church and Parsonage	August 17, 1994 (#94000905)	344 and 332 5th Ave., W. 48°11′37″N 114°19′09″W	Kalispell	
100	Numa Ridge Fire Lookout	Numa Ridge Fire Lookout	February 14, 1986 (#86000357)	Near Bowman Lake; 48°53′01″N 114°10′43″W	West Glacier	
101	Nyack Ranger Station Historic District	Nyack Ranger Station Historic District	February 14, 1986 (#86000359)	Nyack Ranger Station; 48°26′24″N 113°47′43″W	West Glacier	
102	O'Neil Lumber Company Office	O'Neil Lumber Company Office	August 24, 1994 (#94000906)	424 Main St. 48°11′39″N 114°18′41″W	Kalispell	
103	Polebridge Ranger Station Historic District	Polebridge Ranger Station Historic District	February 14, 1986 (#86000337)	Near the northeastern end of Henshaw Bridge on Route 7; 48°46′56″N 114°16′43″W	West Glacier	
104	Polebridge to Numa Ridge Phoneline	Polebridge to Numa Ridge Phoneline	April 4, 1996 (#95001573)	North Fork drainage, Polebridge to Numa Ridge in Glacier National Park; 48°49′59″N 114°13′10″W	West Glacier	
105	Porter Ranch Barn	Porter Ranch Barn	April 15, 1999 (#99000458)	North Somers Rd. 48°06′42″N 114°12′34″W	Kalispell	
106	Quartz Lake Patrol Cabin	Quartz Lake Patrol Cabin	February 14, 1986 (#86000361)	Foot of Quartz Lake; 48°49′19″N 114°08′05″W	West Glacier	
107	William Raftery Homestead		July 21, 1988 (#88001099)	Glacier National Park; 48°48′34″N 114°17′30″W	Big Prairie	
108	Reid-Kent House		August 24, 1994 (#94000907)	246 8th Ave., W. 48°11′39″N 114°19′26″W	Kalispell	
109	Cornelius Ringleberg House	Cornelius Ringleberg House	January 22, 1987 (#86003673)	1028 3rd Ave., W. 48°11′16″N 114°18′50″W	Kalispell	
110	Rogers House	Rogers House	August 24, 1994 (#94000908)	380 5th Ave., E., N. 48°12′18″N 114°18′28″W	Kalispell	
111	Roose-Eckelberry House	Roose-Eckelberry House	August 24, 1994 (#94000909)	146 3rd Ave., W. 48°11′46″N 114°19′01″W	Kalispell	
112	Russell School	Russell School	August 24, 1994 (#94000910)	227 W. Nevada St. 48°12′21″N 114°19′10″W	Kalispell	
113	St. Richard's Church	St. Richard's Church	March 19, 1980 (#80002414)	505 W. 4th Ave. 48°22′25″N 114°11′08″W	Columbia Falls	
114	Sauser-Mercord Building	Sauser-Mercord Building	August 24, 1994 (#94000911)	223-240 Main St. 48°11′42″N 114°18′42″W	Kalispell	
115	Scalplock Mountain Fire Lookout		February 14, 1986 (#86000363)	Accessible by trail connecting to Boundary Trail near the Walton Ranger Station; 48°18′01″N 113°34′24″W	West Glacier	
116	Scandinavian Methodist Church	Scandinavian Methodist Church	August 24, 1994 (#94000912)	203 5th Ave., W. 48°11′43″N 114°19′09″W	Kalispell	
117	Anton Schoenberger Homestead		July 21, 1988 (#88001094)	Glacier National Park; 48°48′34″N 114°17′30″W	Big Prairie	
118	Charlie Schoenberger Homestead		July 21, 1988 (#88001093)	Glacier National Park; 48°48′31″N 114°19′23″W	Big Prairie	
119	Scott-Forhan House	Scott-Forhan House	August 24, 1994 (#94000913)	326 4th Ave., W. 48°11′39″N 114°19′03″W	Kalispell	
120	Sherwood Lodge		December 26, 2008 (#08001226)	Grist Rd. in Glacier National Park; 48°32′11″N 113°59′45″W	West Glacier	
121	Skyland Camp-Bowman Lake Ranger Station	Skyland Camp-Bowman Lake Ranger Station	February 14, 1986 (#86000365)	Southwestern shore of Bowman Lake; 48°49′44″N 114°12′13″W	West Glacier	
122	Smith House	Smith House	August 24, 1994 (#94000915)	476 4th Ave., E., N. 48°12′20″N 114°18′33″W	Kalispell	
123	Snyder House	Snyder House	August 24, 1994 (#94000916)	514 8th Ave., W. 48°11′30″N 114°19′23″W	Kalispell	
124	Soldiers' Home Historic District	Soldiers' Home Historic District	April 21, 1994 (#94000385)	Veterans Dr. 48°21′27″N 114°12′37″W	Columbia Falls	
125	Sperry Chalet	Sperry Chalet	August 2, 1977 (#77000115)	East of West Glacier; 48°36′16″N 113°47′03″W	West Glacier	
126	Stillwater Ranger Station Historic District	Stillwater Ranger Station Historic District	July 8, 1981 (#81000340)	U.S. Route 93; 48°32′33″N 114°34′03″W	Olney	
127	Swan River Bridge	Swan River Bridge	August 3, 2015 (#15000484)	Bridge St. 48°03′33″N 114°04′22″W	Bigfork	Bridge replaced in 2025
128	Swan River Community Hall	Swan River Community Hall	May 30, 2002 (#02000567)	115 Swan River Rd. 48°05′42″N 114°01′40″W	Swan River	
129	Swiftcurrent Fire Lookout	Swiftcurrent Fire Lookout	December 16, 1986 (#86003694)	Near the Continental Garden Wall in the vicinity of Swiftcurrent Mountain; 48°47′08″N 113°45′58″W	West Glacier	
130	Ray E. Taylor House	Ray E. Taylor House	August 10, 1990 (#90001204)	900 S. Baker Ave. 48°24′09″N 114°20′18″W	Whitefish	
131	Thibodeau Electric Shop	Thibodeau Electric Shop	August 24, 1994 (#94000917)	313 2nd Ave., W. 48°11′41″N 114°18′52″W	Kalispell	
132	Thierwechter House	Thierwechter House	August 24, 1994 (#94000918)	305 4th Ave., W. 48°11′40″N 114°19′03″W	Kalispell	
133	Upper Kintla Lake Patrol Cabin	Upper Kintla Lake Patrol Cabin	February 14, 1986 (#86000374)	Head of Kintla Lake; 48°58′38″N 114°14′47″W	West Glacier	
134	Upper Lake McDonald Ranger Station Historic District	Upper Lake McDonald Ranger Station Historic District	December 16, 1986 (#86003699)	Northern shore of Lake McDonald; 48°38′23″N 113°52′21″W	West Glacier	
135	Upper Logging Lake Snowshoe Cabin	Upper Logging Lake Snowshoe Cabin	February 14, 1986 (#86000376)	Near the head of Logging Lake; 48°46′36″N 114°01′22″W	West Glacier	
136	Upper Nyack Snowshoe Cabin	Upper Nyack Snowshoe Cabin	February 14, 1986 (#86000377)	Northern side of Nyack Creek; 48°32′52″N 113°34′00″W	West Glacier	
137	Upper Park Creek Patrol Cabin	Upper Park Creek Patrol Cabin	December 16, 1986 (#86003702)	Junction of Park Creek and Two Medicine Pass Trails; 48°24′54″N 113°27′34″W	West Glacier	
138	Vance Lodge	Vance Lodge	December 29, 1994 (#94001505)	Northern side of Polebridge Loop Rd., about 0.5 miles (0.80 km) northwest of Polebridge; 48°46′38″N 114°17′31″W	Polebridge	
139	Waggener & Campbell Funeral Home	Waggener & Campbell Funeral Home	August 24, 1994 (#94000919)	228 2nd St., W. 48°11′45″N 114°18′57″W	Kalispell	
140	Walker House	Walker House	August 24, 1994 (#94000920)	1122 1st Ave. W. 48°11′14″N 114°18′38″W	Kalispell	
141	Johnnie Walsh's Guest Lodge		July 21, 1988 (#88001096)	Glacier National Park; 48°48′14″N 114°19′02″W	Big Prairie	
142	Johnnie Walsh Homestead		July 21, 1988 (#88001098)	Glacier National Park; 48°48′29″N 114°18′26″W	Big Prairie	
143	Thomas J. Walsh Lodge		November 12, 1998 (#98001365)	Upper Lake McDonald; 48°38′23″N 113°51′22″W	Apgar	
144	Walton Ranger Station Historic District	Walton Ranger Station Historic District	December 16, 1986 (#86003700)	U.S. Route 2 near Essex; 48°16′25″N 113°36′08″W	West Glacier	
145	West Entrance Station	West Entrance Station	April 4, 1996 (#95001581)	Going-to-the-Sun Road, near West Glacier in Glacier National Park; 48°30′23″N 113°59′12″W	West Glacier	
146	West Side Historic District	West Side Historic District	August 24, 1994 (#94000921)	Roughly bounded by 4th St., W., Main St., 10th St., W., and 4th Ave., W. 48°11′29″N 114°18′48″W	Kalispell	
147	Burton and Lulu Wheeler Cabin	Burton and Lulu Wheeler Cabin	November 27, 1998 (#98001527)	Northern end of Lake McDonald; 48°38′25″N 113°53′00″W	Apgar	Boundary increase listed October 24, 2008
148	Woll House	Woll House	August 24, 1994 (#94000922)	905 4th Ave., W. 48°11′20″N 114°18′55″W	Kalispell	
149	Wurtz Homestead	Wurtz Homestead	June 19, 1996 (#96000661)	North Fork Road, 2 miles (3.2 km) north of Ford in the Flathead National Forest; 48°53′55″N 114°23′19″W	Polebridge	

== See also ==
- List of National Historic Landmarks in Montana
- National Register of Historic Places listings in Montana
