= Skyland Camp-Bowman Lake Ranger Station =

- Skyland Camp--Bowman Lake Ranger Station
- U.S. National Register of Historic Places
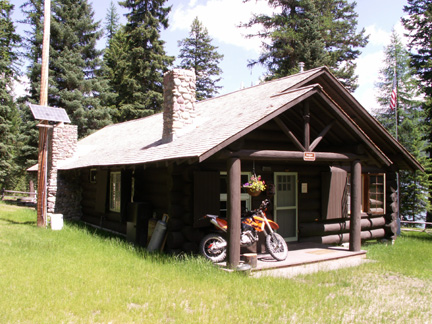

- Location within Montana Location within the United States
- Nearest city: West Glacier, Montana
- Coordinates: 48°49′50.2″N 114°12′8″W
- Built: 1920
- MPS: Glacier National Park MRA
- NRHP reference No.: 86000365
- Added to NRHP: February 14, 1986

The Skyland Camp-Bowman Lake Ranger Station in Glacier National Park was originally built as the Culver Boys' Military Academy. The main building, known variously as the Skyland Camp Messhall, Culver Boys' Military Academy Messhall and Skyline Chalet, was built in 1920 and is a good example of National Park Service Rustic architecture. The main cabin, known as "Rainbow Lodge" was built by the boys of the academy in 1920 from red cedar logs, and is more elaborate and carefully detailed than typical ranger stations of this period. The interior is dominated by a stone fireplace.

The camp was originally owned by the Culver Military Academy of Culver, Indiana, which operated the camp as a concession within the park, on the shore of Bowman Lake. It operated for a few seasons, but poor management caused the National Park Service to terminate the camp's contract. With the camp falling into disrepair, the Park Service demolished all buildings except the Rainbow Lodge in 1940, rehabilitating the lodge for use as a ranger station. Two boathouses are included in the listed area, and many furnishings in the ranger station are contributing features.

== See also ==
- Belly River Ranger Station Historic District
- Cut Bank Ranger Station Historic District
- East Glacier Ranger Station Historic District
- Kintla Lake Ranger Station
- Kishenehn Ranger Station Historic District
- Logging Creek Ranger Station Historic District
- Nyack Ranger Station Historic District
- Polebridge Ranger Station Historic District
- Saint Mary Ranger Station
- Sherburne Ranger Station Historic District
- Swiftcurrent Ranger Station Historic District
- Upper Lake McDonald Ranger Station Historic District
- Walton Ranger Station Historic District
- Polebridge to Numa Ridge Phoneline
