= Polebridge to Numa Ridge Phoneline =

- U.S. National Register of Historic Places
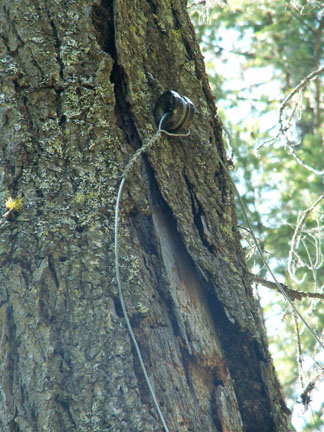

- Location within Montana Location within the United States
- Location: North Fork drainage, Polebridge to Numa Ridge, Glacier NP, West Glacier, Montana
- Coordinates: 48°49′59″N 114°13′10″W
- Built: 1927
- Architect: National Park Service
- MPS: Glacier National Park MPS
- NRHP reference No.: 95001573
- Added to NRHP: April 04, 1996

The Polebridge to Numa Ridge Phoneline is a historic communications path in Glacier National Park in the U.S. state of Montana. The line was the last remaining single-line crank telephone network in the American West. The remaining line, insulators, and terminals are instructive of early communication technology. The system includes the remains of a single strand system using an earth ground. Wire was strung through ceramic insulators mounted on trees. Phone poles still stand in the meadow south of Kishenehn Ranger Station, and a phone remains in place at Bowman Lake.

The line starts at Polebridge Ranger Station, passing Skyland Camp-Bowman Lake Ranger Station, then Numa Ridge Fire Lookout. The first sections were constructed in 1911, with additions to connect ranger stations through the 1930s. In later years, FM radio saw greater use and the extent of the phone system declined. The Polebridge-Numa line persisted until 1985, when it was officially shut down, although unofficial use continued through 1988.
