= Glacier National Park Tourist Trails =

- Glacier National Park Tourist Trails--Inside Trail, South Circle, North Circle
- U.S. National Register of Historic Places
- U.S. Historic district
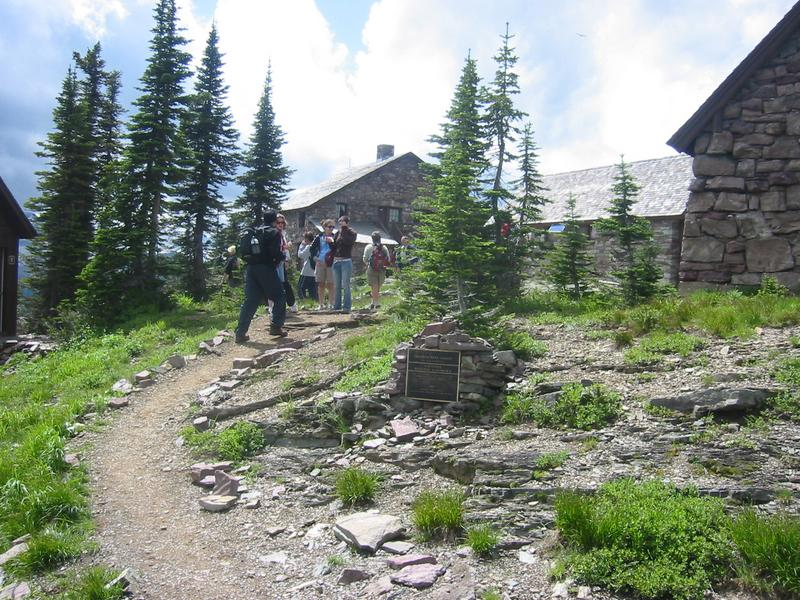
- North Circle Trail at Granite Park Chalet

- Location within Montana Location within the United States
- Location: Inside Trail, South Circle and North Circle Trails, St. Mary, Montana
- Coordinates: 48°41′41″N 113°33′46″W
- Built: 1911
- Architect: Glacier Park Hotel Co.; NPS Landscape Division
- MPS: Glacier National Park MPS
- NRHP reference No.: 95001579
- Added to NRHP: January 19, 1996

The Glacier National Park Tourist Trails, including the Inside Trail, South Circle Trail and North Circle Trail, were established in Glacier National Park to connect a series of tourist camps and hotels established by the Great Northern Railway between 1910 and 1915. Prior to the construction of the Going-to-the-Sun Road, these trails were the primary form of circulation within the park. The trail system includes a number of bridges.

The three separate trail systems link Many Glacier, Two Medicine, Cut Bank, Saint Mary and Goathaunt ranger stations and visitor centers. Sites associated with the trail system include the Gunsight Pass Shelter, Packer's Roost, Pass Creek Snowshoe Cabin, Granite Park Chalet and the Ptarmigan Tunnel.

== North Circle ==
The North Circle Trail describes a loop: Many Glacier - Cosley Lake - Goathaunt - Fifty Mountain - Granite Park - Many Glacier. During the 1920s, tent camps were located at Cosley Lake, Goathaunt and Fifty Mountain, as well as at Red Eagle. The trail's summit follows the Ptarmigan Wall, and was cut and blasted from the cliffside, passing through the Ptarmigan Tunnel to avoid a lengthy detour around the arête. The Park Saddle Horse Company operated multi-day excursions along the trail from 1925, stopping in turn at each camp or chalet.

== South Circle ==
The South Circle Trail runs Lake McDonald Lodge - Sperry Chalet - Gunsight Pass - Sun Point - Piegan Pass - Many Glacier - Swiftcurrent Pass - Granite Park - Packer's Roost. A five-day route was operated on the trail by the Park Saddle Horse Company.

== Inside Trail ==
The Inside Trail connects Two Medicine - Cut Bank - Red Eagle Lake - Saint Mary's Lake.The trail passes over Triple Divide Pass, where waters may drain to the Pacific, Atlantic or Arctic Oceans.

== Structures ==
Packer's Roost West is located at the junction of several trails near the Going-to-the-Sun Road. It serves as a base camp for pack operations over the trails and for service trips to Sperry Chalet and Granite Park Chalet. The Granite Park Trail Cabin is a log structure of standard design, similar to many such structures in the park.

== See also ==
- Many Glacier Barn and Bunkhouse, also known as Packer's Roost East.
- The Very Best and Worst time to Visit Glacier National Park - When to Go and What to See
