= Slide Lake-Otatso Creek Patrol Cabin and Woodshed =

- U.S. National Register of Historic Places
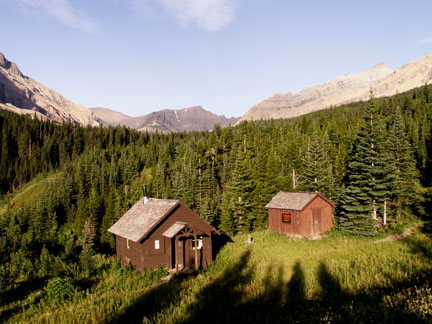

- Location within Montana Location within the United States
- Nearest city: West Glacier, Montana
- Coordinates: 48°54′36″N 113°35′56″W
- Built: 1936
- MPS: Glacier National Park MRA
- NRHP reference No.: 86000370
- Added to NRHP: February 14, 1986

The Slide Lake-Otatso Creek Patrol Cabin and Woodshed in Glacier National Park are a small group of rustic buildings in the park's backcountry. Built in 1936, the patrol cabin is a frame building, unlike the more typical log patrol cabins found throughout the park. The similar woodshed is nearby. The cabin's proximity to the Alpine-themed Many Glacier Hotel may have influenced the decorative detailing, which is unique in Glacier. The only other frame patrol cabin is the Fielding Cabin, in the southern part of the park. The cabin was completely reconstructed in the 1980s "to thwart a particularly aggressive pack rat population". The buildings are located along Otatso Creek, 1.25 miles (2.01 km) downstream from Slide Lake.

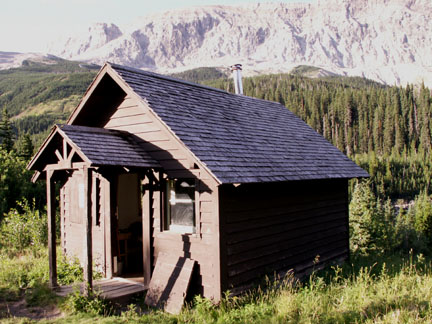
Slide Lake Patrol Cabin
