= Big Prairie =

Big Prairie may refer to:

- Big Prairie Township, Michigan
- Big Prairie (Montana), a meadow and former settlement in Flathead County
- Big Prairie, Ohio, an unincorporated community
