= Mount Brown Fire Lookout =

- U.S. National Register of Historic Places
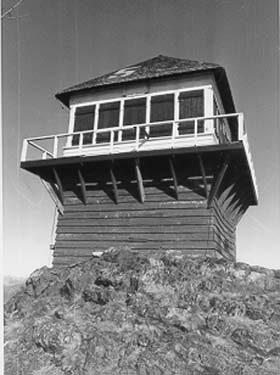

- Location within Montana Location within the United States
- Nearest city: West Glacier
- Coordinates: 48°37′44″N 113°49′58″W
- Built: 1928
- MPS: Glacier National Park MRA
- NRHP reference No.: 86003693
- Added to NRHP: December 16, 1986

The Mount Brown Fire Lookout in Glacier National Park is significant as one of a chain of staffed fire lookout posts within the park. The low two-story timber-construction structure with a pyramidal roof was built in 1928. The design was a standard U.S. Forest Service plan.

== See also ==
- National Register of Historic Places listings in Flathead County, Montana
- National Register of Historic Places listings in Glacier National Park
