= Kintla Lake Ranger Station =

- U.S. National Register of Historic Places
- U.S. Historic district
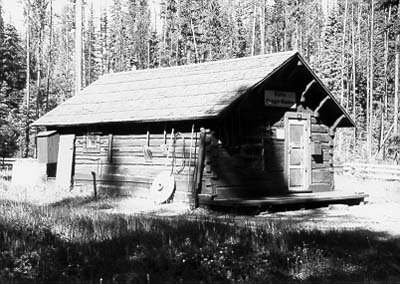

- Location within Montana Location within the United States
- Nearest city: West Glacier, Montana
- Coordinates: 48°56′4″N 114°20′25″W
- Built: 1900
- Architect: Harry E. Doverspike
- MPS: Glacier National Park MRA
- NRHP reference No.: 86000332
- Added to NRHP: February 14, 1986

The Kintla Lake Ranger Station in Glacier National Park is a rustic log structure that was built by the Butte Oil Company in 1900 at Kintla Lake. It was taken over by the National Park Service and used as a ranger station. It is significant as a remnant of early oil exploration activities in the Glacier area. A boathouse was built by the National Park Service in 1935 to the same design as the boathouses at Upper Lake McDonald and Saint Mary ranger stations. A fire cache cabin, identical to those at Logging Creek, Polebridge and Lake McDonald ranger stations was built in 1934.
