= Bowman Lake Road =

- U.S. National Register of Historic Places
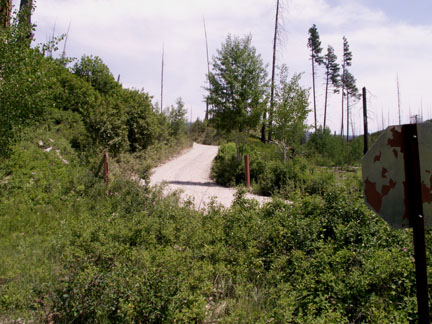

- Location within Montana Location within the United States
- Location: North Fork drainage, between Polebridge and Bowman ranger stations, Glacier NP, vicinity of West Glacier, Montana
- Coordinates: 48°49′39″N 114°12′08″W
- Area: 23.5 acres (9.5 ha)
- Architect: National Park Service, Branch of Plan
- MPS: Glacier National Park MPS
- NRHP reference No.: 95001565
- Added to NRHP: January 19, 1996

The Bowman Lake Road was listed on the National Register of Historic Places in 1996. It was deemed significant " for its association with federal development of the North Fork region.... The site's period of significance extends from construction in 1914, when park officials began concerted efforts to develop the Bowman Lake area as part of its fire-control and recreation-development programs, until the end of the historic period as defined by the National Register (1945)."

The road runs through North Fork Flathead River drainage between Polebridge and Bowman ranger stations in Glacier National Park.
