= Morning Eagle =

- U.S. National Register of Historic Places
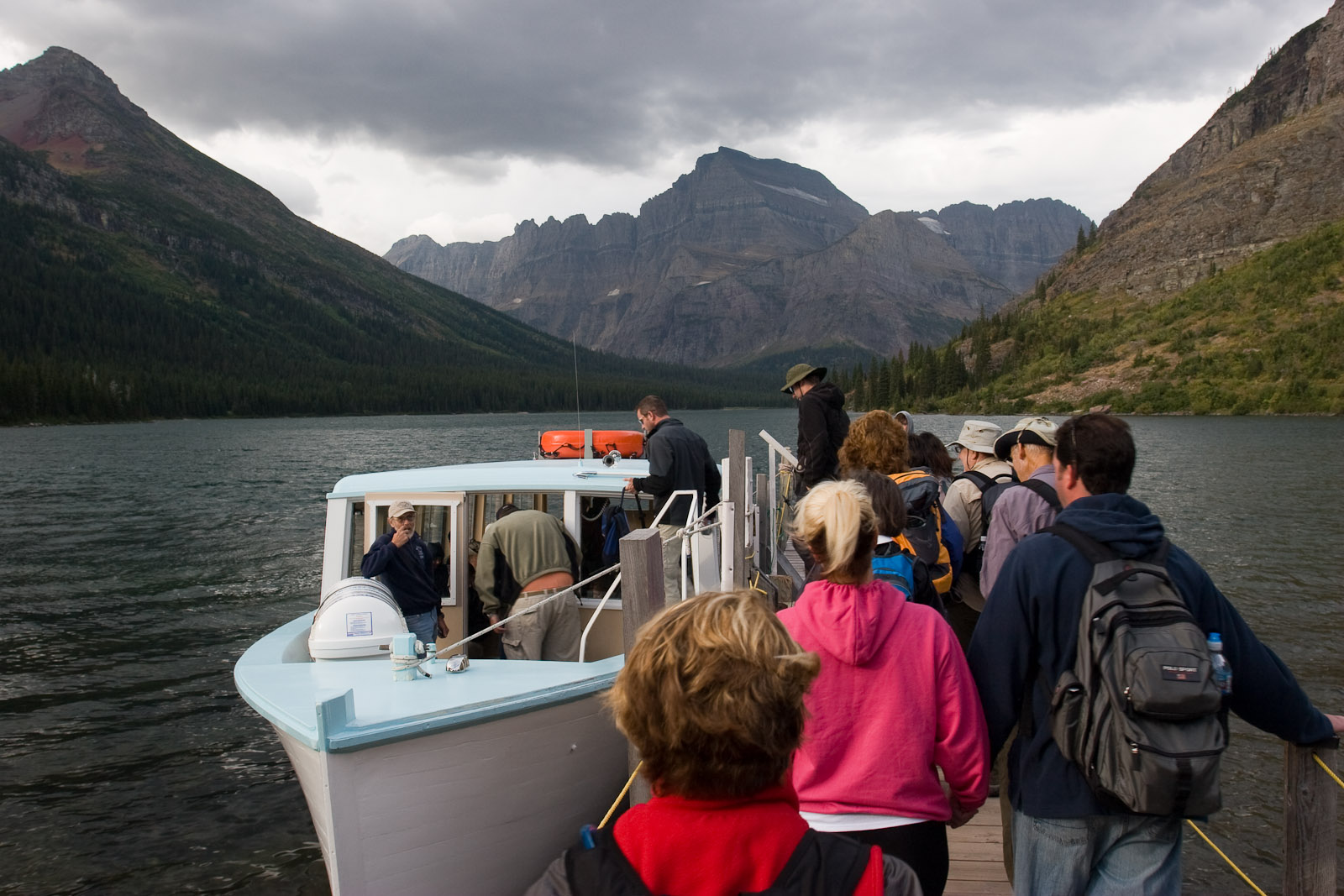

- Location within Montana Location within the United States
- Nearest city: West Glacier, Montana
- Coordinates: 48.7874°N 113.6694°W
- Built: 1945
- MPS: Glacier National Park MRA
- NRHP reference No.: 100002691
- Added to NRHP: July 23, 2018

The Morning Eagle is a tour boat located on Lake Josephine in Glacier National Park. The vessel was constructed in 1945, by J.W. Swanson and Arthur J. Burch. The Morning Eagle was originally named Big Chief and was launched on Swiftcurrent Lake. The name was changed in 1960 and the vessel was moved to Lake Josephine. It was listed on the National Register of Historic Places in 2018. All of the vessel's maintenance is conducted on-site.

== Specifications ==
The Morning Eagle is a 45-foot (14 m) carvel-planked wooden vessel with cedar on an oak frame. It has a maximum occupancy of 49 passengers.
