= Coal Creek Patrol Cabin =

United States historic place in Glacier National Park

- U.S. National Register of Historic Places
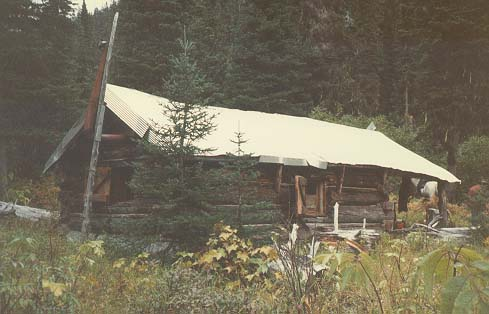

- Location within Montana Location within the United States
- Nearest city: West Glacier, Montana
- Coordinates: 48°25′0″N 113°38′56″W
- Built: 1925
- Architect: National Park Service
- MPS: Glacier National Park MPS
- NRHP reference No.: 99000777
- Added to NRHP: July 1, 1999

The Coal Creek Patrol Cabin in Glacier National Park, Montana, is a rustic backcountry log cabin. Built in 1925, the cabin has a single room with a board floor and a small cellar for a food cache. The cabin was used by rangers on patrol routes from the Nyack and Paola ranger stations.

The cabin is notable for its original roof construction, which consisted of peeled logs laid along the pitch of the roof, culminating in a log ridgepole. The added weight was borne by double log purlins, one on top of the other. The configuration was apparently intended to protect against deadfalls, falling trees or branches. The logs were replaced by shingles in the 1940s and by metal in the 1960s. While the Paola ranger station was abandoned in 1932, as well as the Nyack station, the Coal Creek cabin is maintained and used by trail maintenance crews.
