= Upper Logging Lake Snowshoe Cabin =

- U.S. National Register of Historic Places
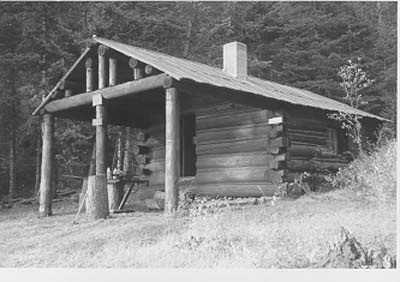

- Location within Montana Location within the United States
- Nearest city: West Glacier, Montana
- Coordinates: 48°46′36″N 114°1′22″W
- Built: 1925
- MPS: Glacier National Park MRA
- NRHP reference No.: 86000376
- Added to NRHP: February 14, 1986

The Upper Logging Lake Snowshoe Cabin was built in 1925 in Glacier National Park. The National Park Service Rustic as a shelter (about one day's travel, or eight to twelve miles) for rangers patrolling the backcountry. The design is similar to that used in Yellowstone National Park, which was in turn adapted from U.S. Forest Service shelters, which were themselves adaptations of trapper cabins.
