= Bruyer Granary =

- U.S. National Register of Historic Places
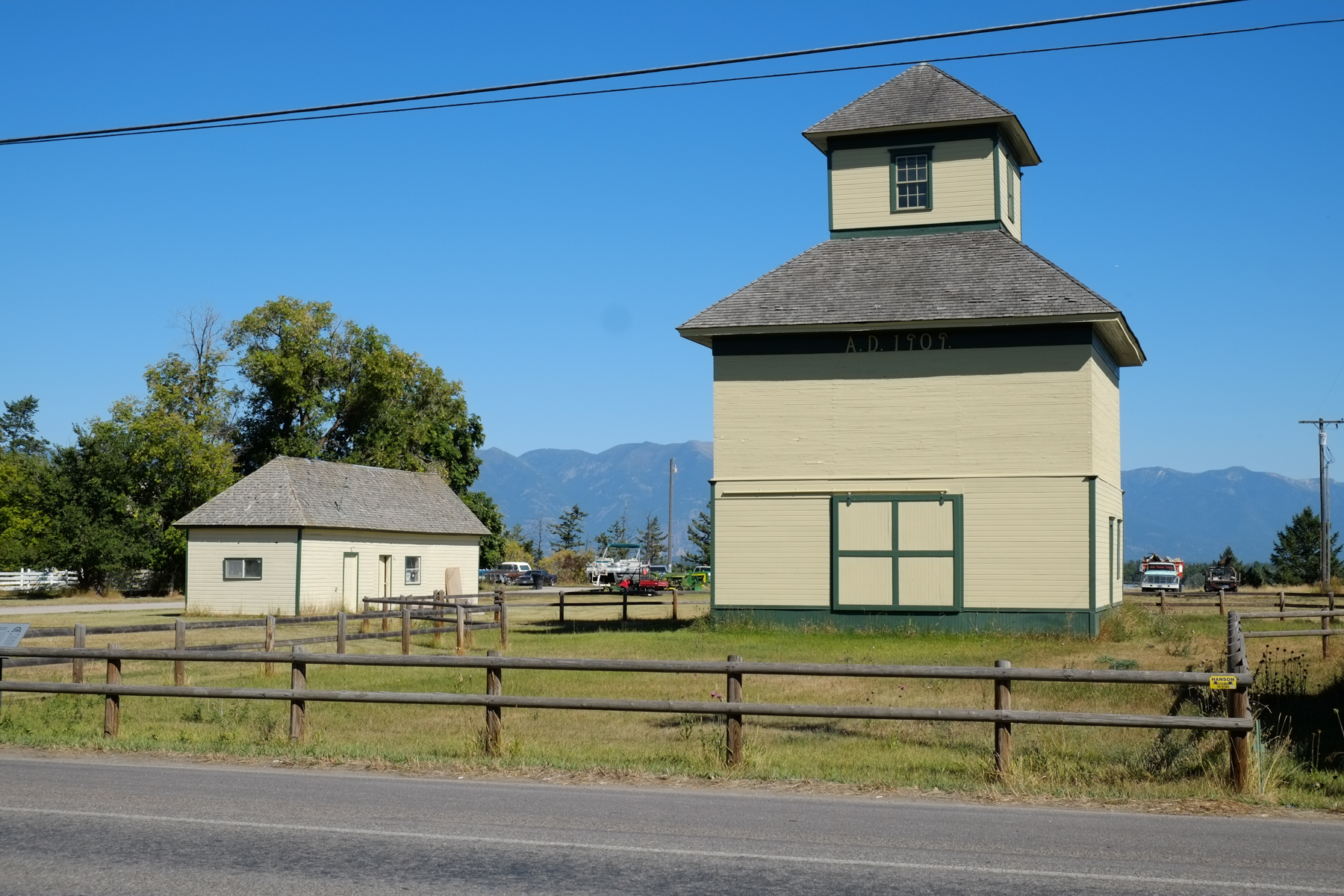

- Location within Montana Location within the United States
- Location: 1355 Whitefish Stage Rd., Kalispell, Montana
- Coordinates: 48°13′41″N 114°18′23″W
- Area: less than one acre
- Built: 1909
- Built by: Julius Bruyer and Sons
- Architectural style: hipped granary
- NRHP reference No.: 06000937
- Added to NRHP: October 12, 2006

The Bruyer Granary, located at 1355 Whitefish Stage Rd. in Kalispell, Montana, was built in 1909. It was listed on the National Register of Historic Places in 2006.

The granary was built by Julius Bruyer and sons. It is a tall two-story building with a pyramidal roof which served the Bruyers' Kal-Mont Dairy.
