= Swiftcurrent Ranger Station Historic District =

United States historic place in Glacier National Park

- U.S. National Register of Historic Places
- U.S. Historic district
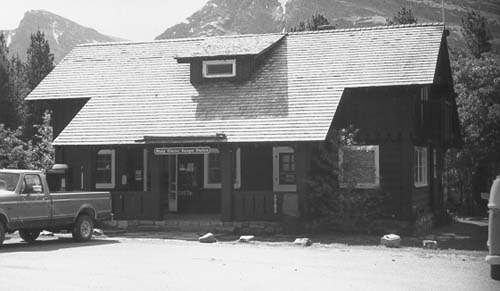

- Location within Montana Location within the United States
- Nearest city: West Glacier, Montana
- Coordinates: 48°47′48″N 113°40′26″W
- Built: 1938
- Architect: S.M. Askevold
- MPS: Glacier National Park MRA
- NRHP reference No.: 86003690
- Added to NRHP: December 19, 1986

The Swiftcurrent Ranger Station is an example of the Swiss Chalet style that prevailed in the early years of Glacier National Park, before the establishment of the similar National Park Service Rustic style. The station was designed by Edward A. Nickel and built by Ole Norden and S. M. Askevold. It replaced a previous ranger station, destroyed in a 1936 forest fire. All structures in the district were built within a single year and are consistent in design and materials.

The associated historic district includes five employee cabins in a similar style by the same builders, along with several utility structures.

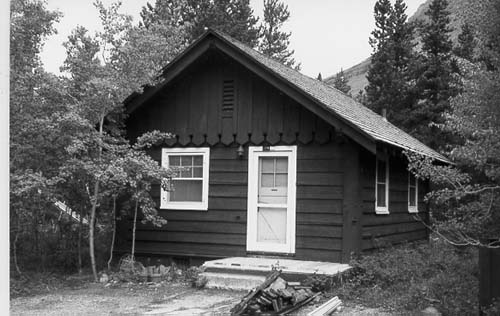
Swiftcurrent cabin
