= Billsborough House =

Historic house in Montana, United States

- U.S. National Register of Historic Places
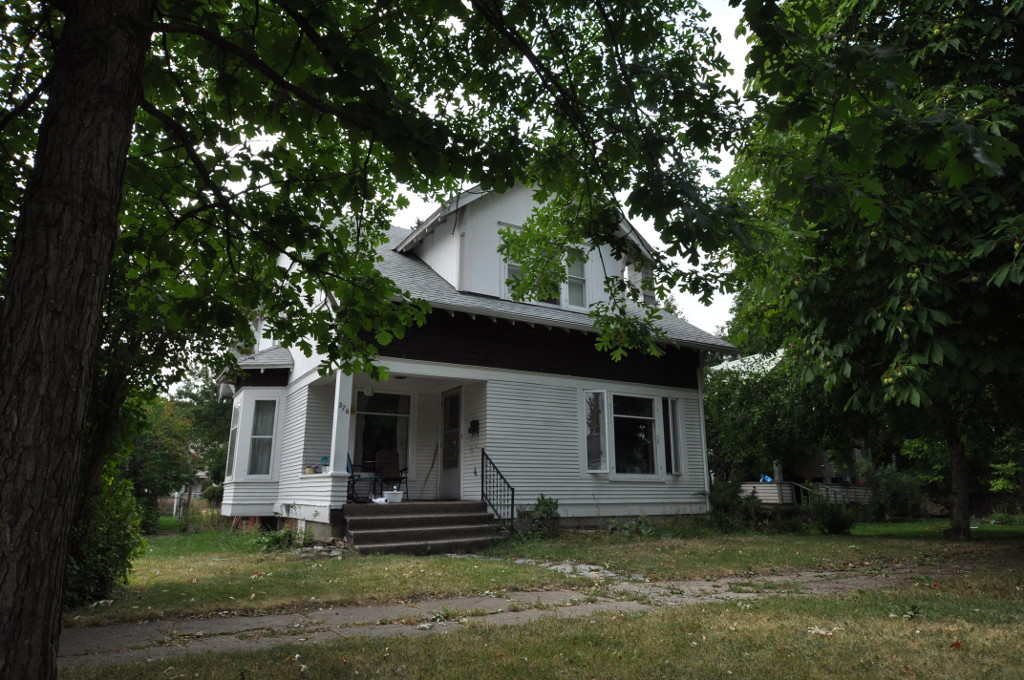

- Location within Montana Location within the United States
- Location: 376 6th Ave. E. N., Kalispell, Montana
- Coordinates: 48°12′19″N 114°18′22″W
- Area: less than one acre
- Built: 1914
- Architectural style: Craftsman architecture
- MPS: Kalispell MPS
- NRHP reference No.: 94000873
- Added to NRHP: August 24, 1994

The Billsborough House, at 376 6th Avenue East North in Kalispell, Montana, was built in 1914. It was listed on the National Register of Historic Places in 1994.

It is a one-and-a-half-story side-gabled Craftsman-style house, with large front and rear dormers and wide bracket-supported eaves. As of 1994 at least the roof was covered with wood shingles.

The property includes a two-car garage built before 1927.
