= Logan Creek Patrol Cabin =

- U.S. National Register of Historic Places
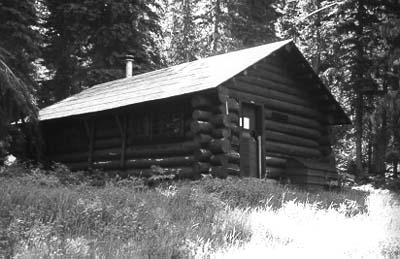

- Location within Montana Location within the United States
- Nearest city: West Glacier, Montana
- Coordinates: 48°43′25″N 113°45′48″W
- Built: 1925
- MPS: Glacier National Park MRA
- NRHP reference No.: 86000348
- Added to NRHP: February 14, 1986

The Logan Creek Patrol Cabin in Glacier National Park is a rustic backcountry log cabin. Built in 1925, the cabin has a single room. It is unusual among Glacier's patrol cabins in lacking a covered porch to offer sheltered firewood storage and protection for the entrance.
