= Upper Park Creek Patrol Cabin =

- U.S. National Register of Historic Places
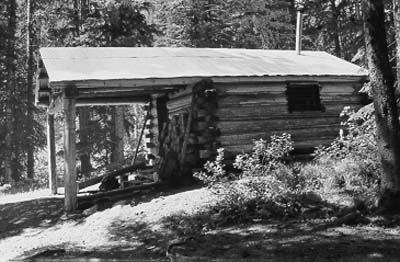

- Location within Montana Location within the United States
- Nearest city: West Glacier, Montana
- Coordinates: 48°24′54″N 113°27′34″W
- Built: 1928
- MPS: Glacier National Park MRA
- NRHP reference No.: 86003702
- Added to NRHP: December 16, 1986

The Upper Park Creek Patrol Cabin in Glacier National Park is a rustic backcountry log cabin. Built in 1928, the cabin has a single room. The cabin was built to National Park Service design G913, and adaptation of cabins used at Yellowstone National Park, which had been modeled on those used by the U.S. Forest Service, which in turn were derivations of backwoods trappers' cabins. The Upper Park Creek cabin was more difficult than most to construct, due to its high, remote location.
