= McCarthy Homestead Cabin =

Historic house in Montana, United States

- U.S. National Register of Historic Places
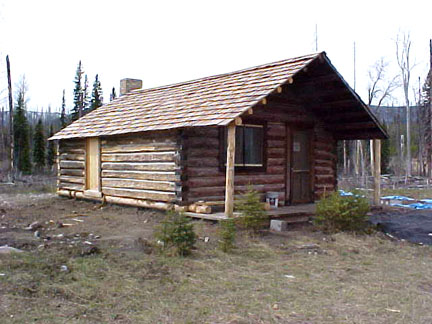

- Location within Montana Location within the United States
- Nearest city: West Glacier, Montana
- Coordinates: 48°48′27″N 114°19′21″W
- Built: 1908
- Architect: Jeremiah McCarthy
- MPS: Glacier National Park MRA
- NRHP reference No.: 86003691
- Added to NRHP: December 16, 1986

The McCarthy Homestead Cabin is a remnant of early settlement in what would become Glacier National Park. Jeremiah McCarthy built the log homestead in the North Fork area in 1908 after completion of the North Fork Road and passage of the Forest Homestead Act of 1906. Building the cabin was part of beginning to prove up a 130 acres (53 ha) homestead. Jeremiah died of consumption in May 1909, but his wife Margaret and eldest child continued the homesteading process by tilling a required amount of land in 1909. And with further improvements each year a "Final Proof" certificate was earned in 1913. Meanwhile, in 1910 the property was included within the area of the new Glacier National Park; it became a private inholding. Margaret McCarthy died in 1939 but children and grandchildren kept spending summers here. In 1970 it was bought by the National Park Service.

The cabin is the only representative of pre-1910 homesteading activity on the west side of the Continental Divide in Glacier. During the 1930s a Civilian Conservation Corps camp was built nearby. Around the same time, the cabin, and others nearby, transitioned from homesteading inholdings to summer cabins for their owners. In the 1950s some of the CCC structures were relocated to the vicinity of the cabin. The National Park Service purchased the property in 1970.
