= Sherwood Lodge =

- U.S. National Register of Historic Places
- Location within Montana Location within the United States
- Location: Grist Rd., Glacier National Park, near West Glacier, Montana
- Coordinates: 48°32′11″N 113°59′45″W
- Area: 1.8 acres (0.73 ha)
- Built: c.1919
- Built by: Edward J. Cruger, Peter Aubert, Martin Sibley
- Architect: Horace W. Austin
- Architectural style: Rustic Style
- MPS: Recreational Camps on Lake McDonald, MT, 1892—1970 MPS
- NRHP reference No.: 08001226
- Added to NRHP: December 26, 2008

Sherwood Lodge, in Glacier National Park near West Glacier, Montana, was built in 1919. It was listed on the National Register of Historic Places in 2008.

It is located on the west shore of Lake McDonald, and includes a main lodge (Sherwood Lodge), a boat house, a garage, and a septic pump house. It consists of the northernmost eight lots of Apgar's Glacier Park Cottage Sites subdivision, bordering the lake to the front, Grist Road to the rear, and Federal land to the north.

The main lodge, built around 1919, is a one-and-a-half-story log cabin. It was designed by Long Beach, California architect W. Horace Austin (1881-1942) and was built by Edward J. Cruger, Peter Aubert, and Martin Sibley.

There is a second contributing building on the property.

It was listed as part of a study, "Recreational Camps on Lake McDonald, MT, 1892—1970 MPS".
