= Scalplock Mountain Fire Lookout =

- U.S. National Register of Historic Places
- Location within Montana Location within the United States
- Nearest city: West Glacier, Montana
- Coordinates: 48°18′1″N 113°34′24″W
- Built: 1931
- MPS: Glacier National Park MRA
- NRHP reference No.: 86000363
- Added to NRHP: February 14, 1986

The Scalplock Mountain Fire Lookout in Glacier National Park is significant as one of a chain of staffed fire lookout posts within the park. The low two-story timber-construction structure with a pyramidal roof was built in 1931. The lookout affords views into the Park Creek valley and the Middle Fork of the Flathead River, which was traversed by the Great Northern Railway (U.S.) and US 2, prolific sources of fires. The lookout was built to standard plans derived from U.S. Forest Service plans.
