= West Entrance Station =

Coordinates: 48.506408°N 113.987647°W

- U.S. National Register of Historic Places
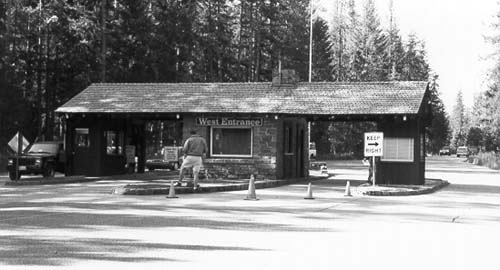

- Location within Montana Location within the United States
- Location: Going-to-the-Sun Rd., near West Glacier, Glacier NP, West Glacier, Montana
- Built: 1942
- Architect: National Park Service, Branch of Plan
- MPS: Glacier National Park MPS
- NRHP reference No.: 95001581
- Added to NRHP: April 4, 1996

The West Entrance Station at Glacier National Park was built by the Civilian Conservation Corps in 1942. An example of the National Park Service Rustic style, it was designed by the National Park Service Branch of Plans and Design.

The entrance station was designed at National Park Service architect Albert Good's suggestion to specifically resemble a toll station. The station is a wood-frame building faced with random ashlar stone. The roof is framed using logs., supported by 13 inches (33 cm) log posts. The entrance station is similar to that built at the park's Saint Mary entrance at about the same time, using the same plans. A 1963 modification added two checking booths with board-and-batten siding under the wings of the station.

The West Entrance Station was placed on the National Register of Historic Places on April 4, 1966.
