= Loneman Fire Lookout =

- U.S. National Register of Historic Places
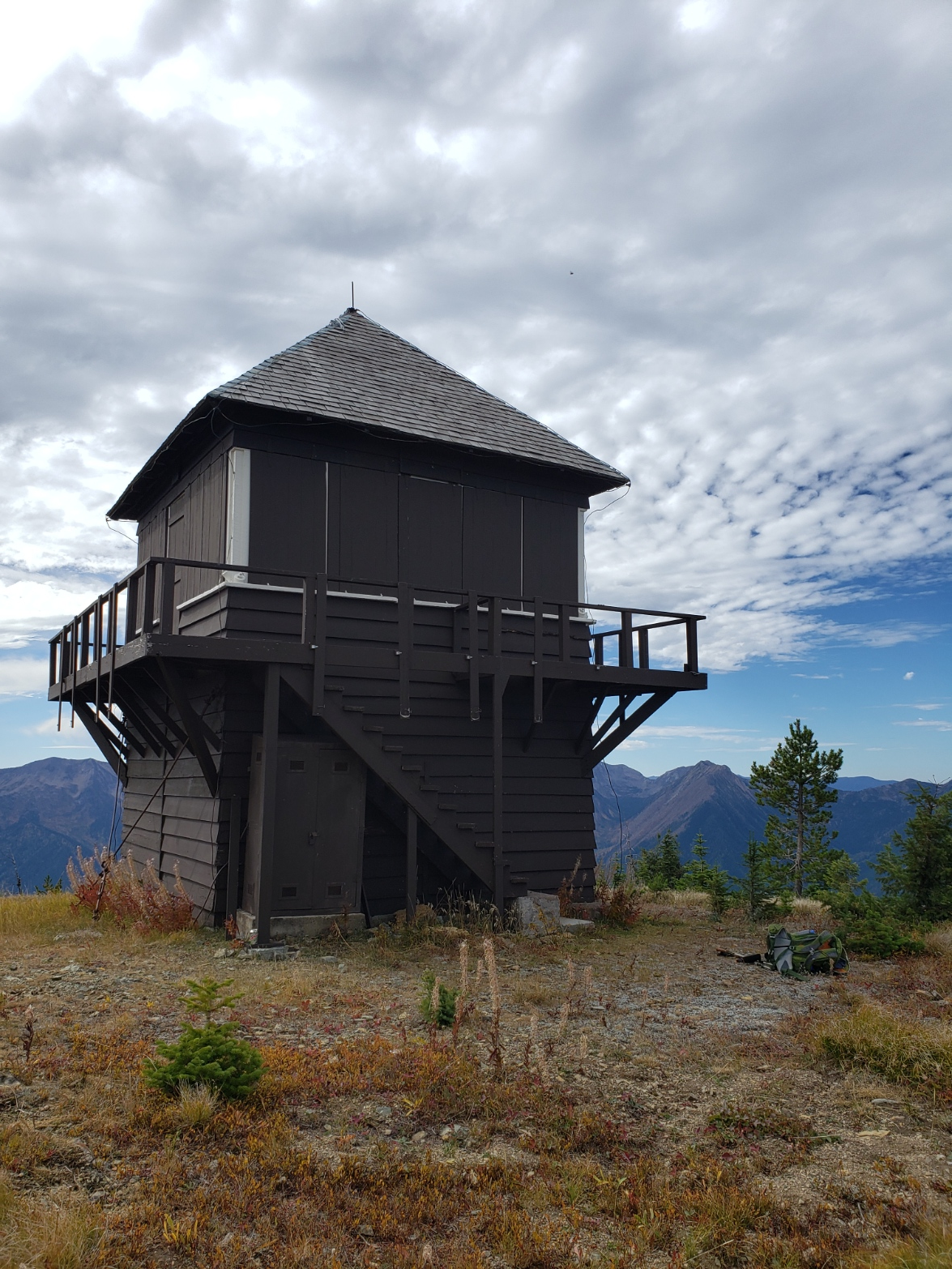

- Location within Montana Location within the United States
- Nearest city: West Glacier, Montana
- Coordinates: 48°29′21″N 113°46′4″W
- Built: 1930
- MPS: Glacier National Park MRA
- NRHP reference No.: 86000353
- Added to NRHP: February 14, 1986

The Loneman Fire Lookout in Glacier National Park is significant as one of a chain of staffed fire lookout posts within the park. The low two-story timber-construction structure with a pyramidal roof was built in 1933. The lookout uses a standard design originated by the U.S. Forest Service. Built in 1930, it is one several similar structures built in a program to establish an overlapping chain of fire lookouts in the park.
