= Headquarters Historic District =

Historic district in Montana, United States

- U.S. National Register of Historic Places
- U.S. Historic district
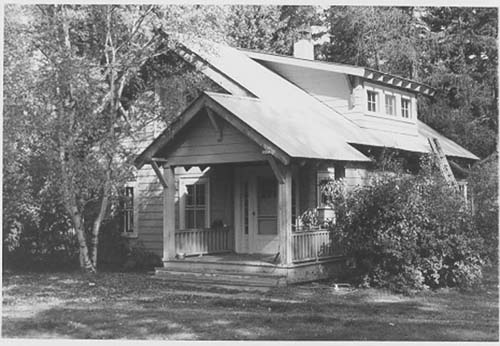

- Location within Montana Location within the United States
- Location: E of Glacier Rt. 1 at crossing of Middle Fork of the Flathead R., Glacier NP, West Glacier, Montana
- Coordinates: 48°30′6″N 113°58′47″W
- Architect: National Park Service; NPS Landscape Division
- MPS: Glacier National Park MPS
- NRHP reference No.: 95001569
- Added to NRHP: January 19, 1996

The Headquarters Historic District of Glacier National Park comprises the administrative and housing buildings near West Glacier, Montana on the west side of the park. The area contains a mixture of styles, ranging from National Park Service Rustic to more modern structures built immediately after World War II.

Many of the buildings were built by labor from the Works Progress Administration and the Civilian Conservation Corps. Post-World War II development consists primarily of housing developed under the Mission 66 initiative. Significant buildings in the National Park Service Rustic style include the Superintendent's Residence (1923), the original Administration Building (1923), and a number of residences. Shared facilities included a messhall, bunkhouses and utility buildings.
