= Heaven's Peak Fire Lookout =

- U.S. National Register of Historic Places
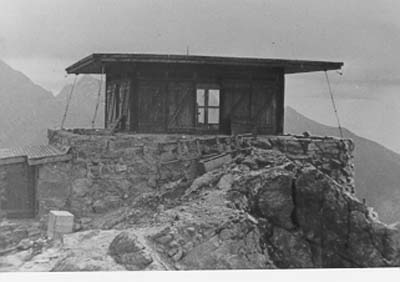

- Location within Montana Location within the United States
- Nearest city: West Glacier, Montana
- Coordinates: 48°44′53″N 113°52′35″W
- Built: 1945
- MPS: Glacier National Park MRA
- NRHP reference No.: 86003688
- Added to NRHP: December 19, 1986

The Heaven's Peak Fire Lookout is a historic fire lookout post located in Glacier National Park, Montana, USA. It is significant as one of a chain of staffed fire lookout posts within the park. The one-story timber-construction with a flat roof was built in 1945. The flat, overhanging roof is anchored to the stone foundation with cables.

The lookout was to be built in 1940 by local contractor Ole Norden as part of a Public Works Administration project. However, Norden was unable to perform the work and it was completed in 1945 under a different contract.
