= Pass Creek Snowshoe Cabin =

- U.S. National Register of Historic Places
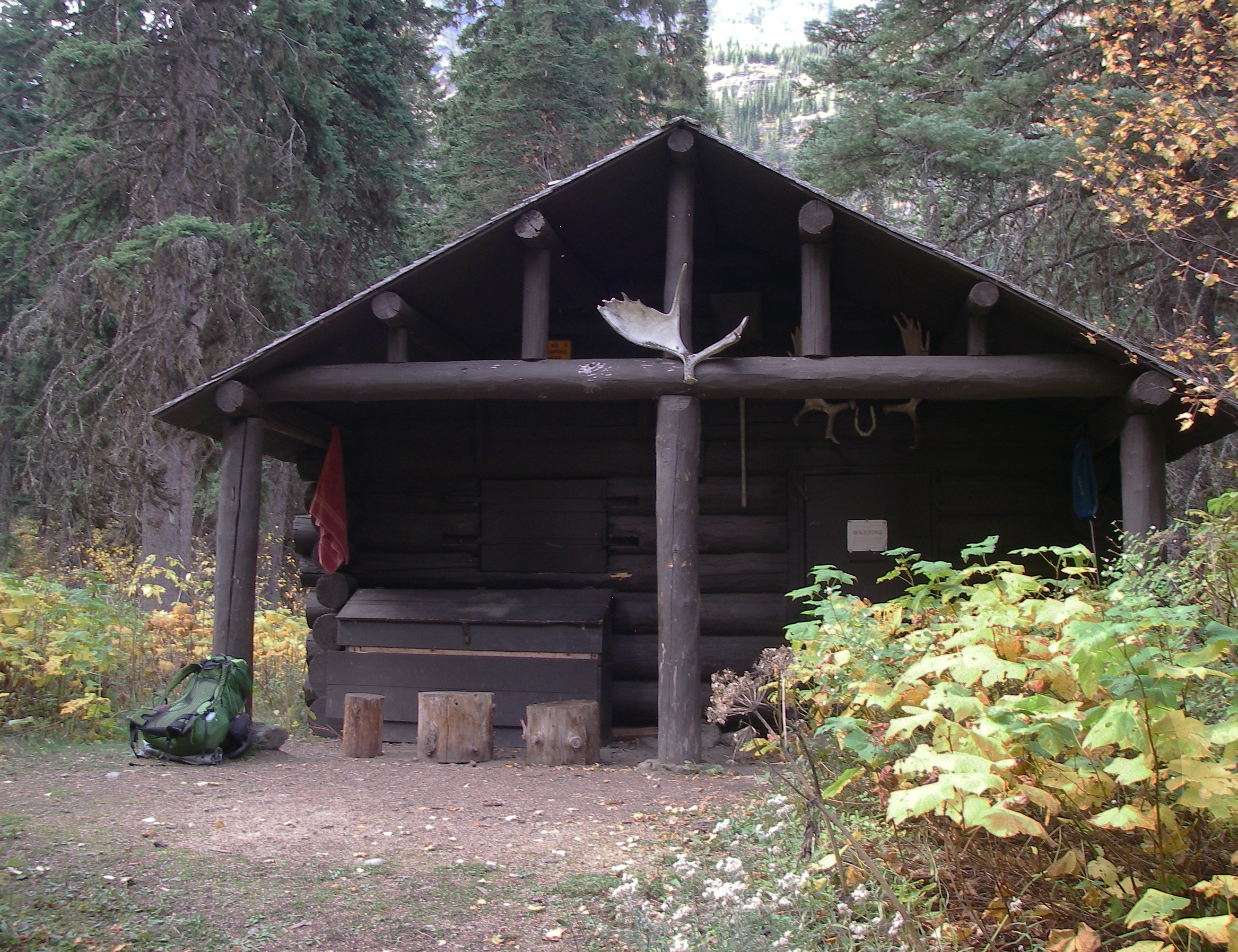
- Pass Creek Snowshoe Cabin in 2021

- Location within Montana Location within the United States
- Nearest city: West Glacier, Montana
- Coordinates: 48°53′47″N 113°54′23″W
- Built: 1938
- MPS: Glacier National Park MRA
- NRHP reference No.: 86003689
- Added to NRHP: December 19, 1986

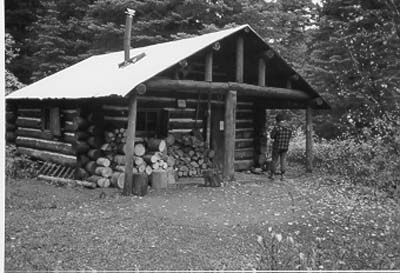
Pass Creek Snowshoe Cabin built in 1938

The Pass Creek Snowshoe Cabin, built in 1938 in Glacier National Park, is a significant resource both architecturally and historically as a shelter, usually 8–12 miles (13–19 km) apart, for patrolling backcountry rangers.

The Pass Creek shelter was originally built by trail crews on their own initiative as a more permanent and bear-proof accommodation than tents, which had been repeatedly raided. The cabin is therefore slightly larger and taller than the Park Service-standard cabins.
