= Cattle Queen Snowshoe Cabin =

- U.S. National Register of Historic Places
- Location within Montana Location within the United States
- Location: McDonald Subdistrict, near West Glacier, Montana
- Coordinates: 48°48′38″N 113°49′15″W
- Area: less than one acre
- Built: 1923
- Built by: National Park Service
- Architectural style: National Park Service Rustic
- MPS: Glacier National Park MPS
- NRHP reference No.: 99000778
- Added to NRHP: July 1, 1999

The Cattle Queen Snowshoe Cabin, near West Glacier, Montana is a National Park Service log cabin built in 1923. It was listed on the National Register of Historic Places in 1999.

It is significant as "one of the oldest surviving backcountry patrol cabins in Glacier National Park. This is reflected in the structure's unrefined, nonstandard design and relatively primitive construction. The building is both indicative of its wilderness setting and of the earliest efforts of NPS administrators to "protect" the park's backcountry. For many years, in common with some three dozen other backcountry structures, the Cattle Queen Cabin was an important overnight stop for rangers on backcountry patrol, winter and summer."

It is a one-room wood-floored cabin with a gable roof having extended purlins creating a large front porch. When listed in 1999, it was painted brown, was very weathered, and had a corrugated metal roof, which had covered original shingles.

Its ridgepole and purlins were cracked by a tree fall in the 1970s.
