= Ford Creek Patrol Cabin =

- U.S. National Register of Historic Places
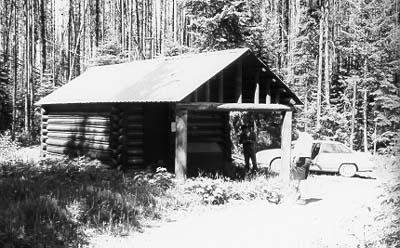

- Location within Montana Location within the United States
- Nearest city: West Glacier, Montana
- Coordinates: 48°37′33″N 113°56′36″W
- Built: 1928
- MPS: Glacier National Park MRA
- NRHP reference No.: 86000342
- Added to NRHP: February 14, 1986

The Ford Creek Patrol Cabin in Glacier National Park was built in 1928. The National Park Service Rustic log structure was a significant resource both architecturally and historically as a network of shelters, approx. one day's travel apart, for patrolling backcountry rangers.

The Ford Creek cabin was the first of four identical cabins built to National Park Service plan G913 in 1928-29 by private contractors, described as "good log men", at a total cost of $350.

It was destroyed in a suspected arson fire in late July 2020.
