= Bowman Lake Patrol Cabin =

- U.S. National Register of Historic Places
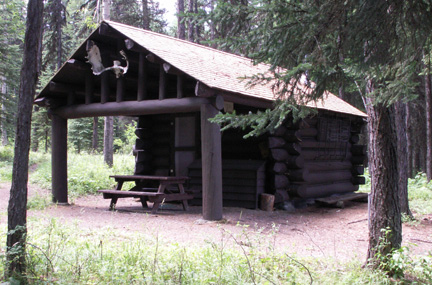

- Location within Montana Location within the United States
- Nearest city: West Glacier, Montana
- Coordinates: 48°49′40″N 114°11′31″W
- Built: 1934
- Architect: Austin Weikert
- MPS: Glacier National Park MRA
- NRHP reference No.: 86000340
- Added to NRHP: February 14, 1986

The Bowman Lake Patrol Cabin in Glacier National Park, Montana, United States, is a rustic back-country log cabin. Built in 1934, the cabin has a single room, with a front porch extension to create a shelter from snowfall.

During the 1920s and 1930s the National Park Service built a series of snowshoe cabins or patrol cabins in Glacier's back country. The cabins were built to a standardized plan that was developed in Yellowstone National Park, which were themselves similar to those used by the U.S. Forest Service which took design cues from trappers' cabins. Cabins usually included a bear-and-rodent-proof food cache under the floor. Furnishings were limited to a hinged cupboard which could be folded down to form a table, a stove, and a bunk bed.

The Bowman Lake cabin, located closer to the "front country" than most, featured a six-burner wood stove, a permanent table and a bedding storage box.
