= Huckleberry Fire Lookout =

- Huckleberry Fire Outlook
- U.S. National Register of Historic Places
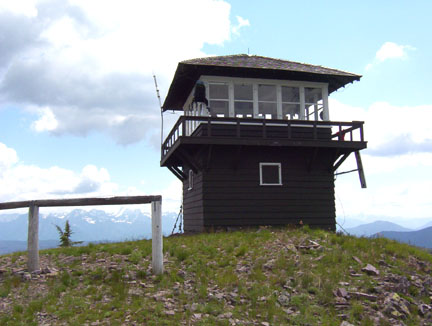

- Location within Montana Location within the United States
- Nearest city: West Glacier, Montana
- Coordinates: 48°36′1″N 114°8′1″W
- Built: 1933
- MPS: Glacier National Park MRA
- NRHP reference No.: 86000346
- Added to NRHP: February 14, 1986

The Huckleberry Fire Lookout in Glacier National Park is significant as one of a chain of staffed fire lookout posts within the park. The low two-story timber-construction structure with a pyramidal roof was built in 1933, replacing a similar structure built in 1923. It is one of several similar structures built to a modified version of a plan developed by the U.S. Forest Service.
