= Upper Kintla Lake Patrol Cabin =

- U.S. National Register of Historic Places
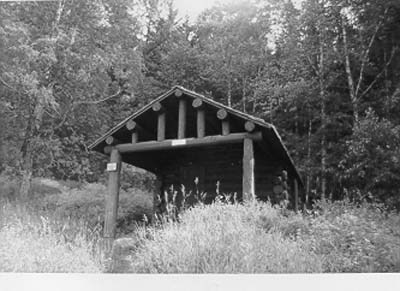

- Location within Montana Location within the United States
- Nearest city: West Glacier, Montana
- Coordinates: 48°58′38″N 114°14′47″W
- Built: 1931
- MPS: Glacier National Park MRA
- NRHP reference No.: 86000374
- Added to NRHP: February 14, 1986

The Upper Kintla Lake Patrol Cabin in Glacier National Park is a rustic backcountry log cabin. Built in 1931 to standard National Park Service plan G913, the cabin has a single room. The cabin was modeled after similar cabins used at Yellowstone National Park, which were in turn similar to those used by the U.S. Forest Service, which resembled trappers' cabins. The Upper Kintla Lake Patrol Cabin is actually situated on the eastern shore of Kintla Lake which is almost 2 miles (3.2 km) west of Upper Kintla Lake.
