= Numa Ridge Fire Lookout =

- U.S. National Register of Historic Places
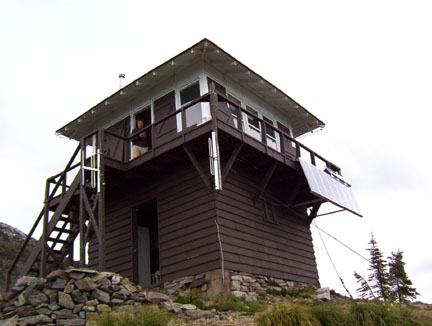

- Location within Montana Location within the United States
- Nearest city: West Glacier, Montana
- Coordinates: 48°53′1″N 114°10′43″W
- Built: 1934
- MPS: Glacier National Park MRA
- NRHP reference No.: 86000357
- Added to NRHP: February 14, 1986

The Numa Ridge Fire Lookout in Glacier National Park is significant as one of a chain of staffed fire lookout posts within the park. The low two-story timber-construction structure with a pyramidal roof was built in 1933. The lookout was built to a standard plan originated by the U.S. Forest Service as part of a program to provide overlapping fire lookout coverage within the park.

Author Edward Abbey spent the summer of 1975 manning Numa Ridge Lookout.
