= North Fork Road =

- U.S. National Register of Historic Places
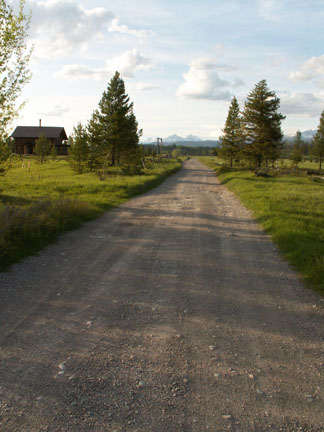

- Location within Montana Location within the United States
- Location: North Fork drainage, Fish Creek to Kintla Lake, Glacier NP, West Glacier, Montana
- Coordinates: 48°32′53″N 113°59′11″W
- Architect: NPS Landscape Division
- MPS: Glacier National Park MPS
- NRHP reference No.: 95001572
- Added to NRHP: January 19, 1996

The North Fork Road in Glacier National Park was built in 1901. The Butte Oil Company constructed a rough wagon road from Lake McDonald to its oil well at Kintla Lake, encouraging the development of the North Fork region. From 1935–1945, the National Park Service developed the road adding culverts and drains. The unpaved road extends nearly forty miles, to the Canada–United States border.

In 1933 a proposal was advanced to extend the road to Canada to connect with a proposed road on the Canadian side of the border that would create a loop around Glacier and Waterton Lakes National Park. No further action was taken, and by the 1950s the plan had been abandoned.
