= Cut Bank Ranger Station Historic District =

One of the first buildings built in Glacier by the National Park Service

- U.S. National Register of Historic Places
- U.S. Historic district
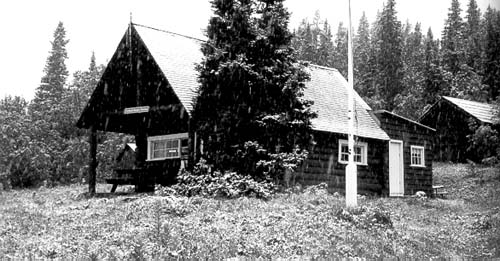

- Location within Montana Location within the United States
- Location: N side Cut Bank Creek, Glacier NP, East Glacier, Montana
- Coordinates: 48°36′22″N 113°22′34″W
- Built: 1917
- Architect: National Park Service; Civilian Conservation Corps
- Architectural style: Swiss Chalet Revival
- MPS: Glacier National Park MPS
- NRHP reference No.: 95001566
- Added to NRHP: January 19, 1996

The Cut Bank Ranger Station in Glacier National Park was one of the first buildings built in Glacier by the National Park Service. Built in 1917, the design is in keeping with park hotel structures built by the Great Northern Railway in a Swiss chalet style that predated the fully developed National Park Service Rustic style.

The station was staffed year-round until the late 1930s when it became a summer-only station. It was one of the first National Park Service-built facilities in Glacier. The design pre-dates the standardized National Park Service Rustic style, using a similar but simplified construction technique resembling pioneer construction. It is similar to the Saint Mary Ranger Station.

A barn was added in 1935 by Civilian Conservation Corps labor, along with a woodshed. Both structures were built to adaptations of Park Service standard designs.
