= Big Prairie (Montana) =

Coordinates: 48°49′17″N 114°19′38″W

Big Prairie, Montana, el. 3,625 feet (1,105 m), is an open meadow area on the east side of the North Fork of the Flathead River, in Glacier National Park and is a former settlement. It is within Flathead County, Montana. It was settled by at least 19 homesteads in the early 20th century.

It is the location of several places listed on the National Register of Historic Places:

- Margaret McCarthy Homestead
- J. K. Miller Homestead
- William Raftery Homestead
- Anton Schoenberger Homestead
- Charlie Schoenberger Homestead
- Johnnie Walsh's Guest Lodge
- Johnnie Walsh Homestead

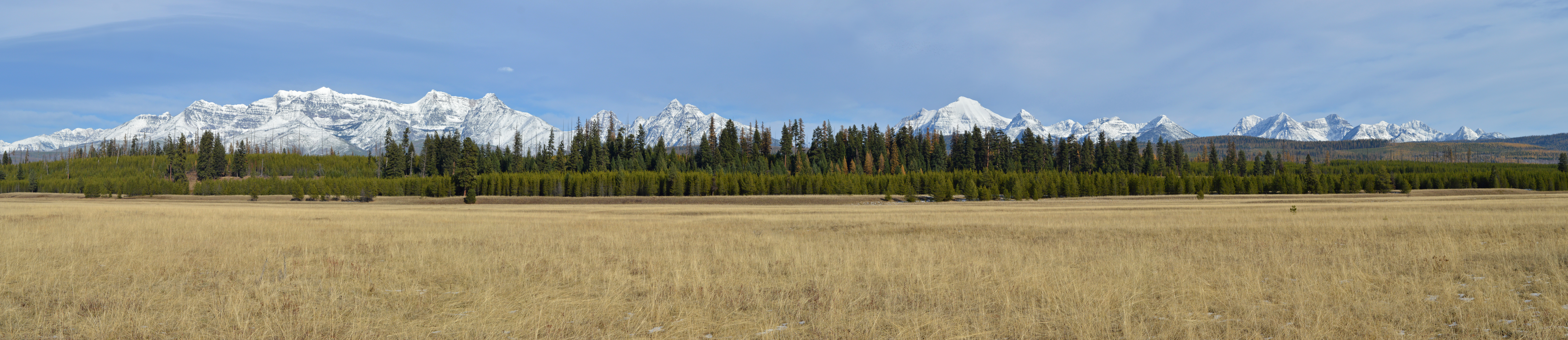
Big Prairie
