= Lower Park Creek Patrol Cabin =

- U.S. National Register of Historic Places
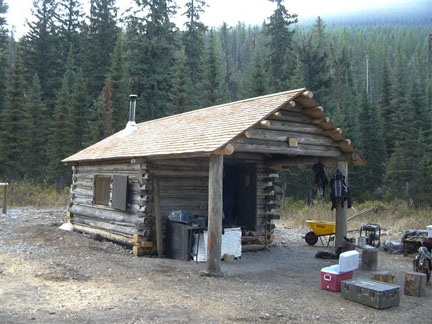

- Location within Montana Location within the United States
- Nearest city: West Glacier, Montana
- Coordinates: 48°20′8″N 113°32′37″W
- Built: 1925
- MPS: Glacier National Park MRA
- NRHP reference No.: 86003701
- Added to NRHP: December 16, 1986

The Lower Park Creek Patrol Cabin in Glacier National Park is a rustic backcountry log cabin. Built in 1925, the cabin has a single room. The design originated at Yellowstone National Park.
