= Nyack Ranger Station Historic District =

Historic district in Montana, United States

- U.S. National Register of Historic Places
- U.S. Historic district
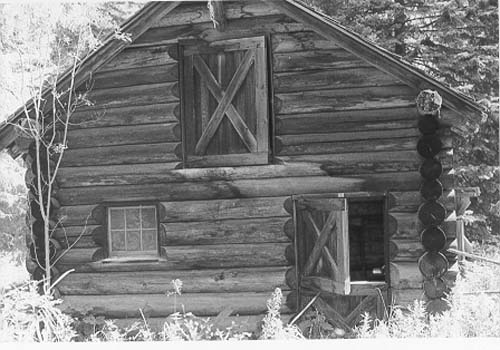
- Nyack Ranger Station barn

- Location within Montana Location within the United States
- Nearest city: West Glacier, Montana
- Coordinates: 48°26′24″N 113°47′43″W
- Built: 1928
- Architect: Austin Weikert
- MPS: Glacier National Park MRA
- NRHP reference No.: 86000359
- Added to NRHP: February 14, 1986

The Nyack Ranger Station Historic District encompasses the remnants of the former ranger station. Only two buildings now remain: the barn, built in 1935 from plans by the National Park Service Branch of Plans and Design, and the fire cache cabin, built by Austin Weikert in 1935.

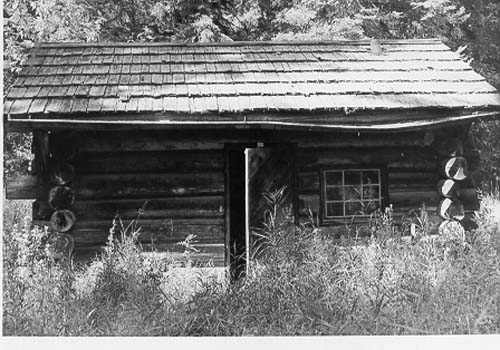
Nyack Ranger Station fire cache
