= Walton Ranger Station Historic District =

Ranger station

- U.S. National Register of Historic Places
- U.S. Historic district
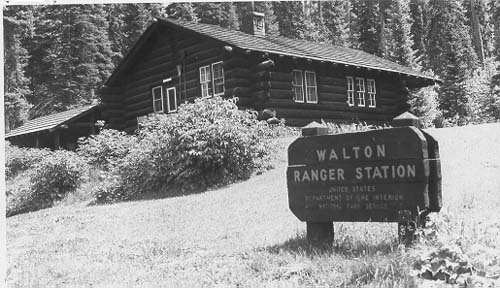

- Location within Montana Location within the United States
- Nearest city: West Glacier, Montana
- Coordinates: 48°16′25″N 113°36′8″W
- Built: 1932
- MPS: Glacier National Park MRA
- NRHP reference No.: 86003700
- Added to NRHP: December 16, 1986

The Walton Ranger Station in Glacier National Park was constructed to "Standard Ranger Station, GNP" plans as a year-round station at Walton to replace the old Paola Ranger Station and to place a station near US 2, a well-traveled highway through the park. The National Park Service Rustic structure is typical of its time period.
