= Logging Creek Ranger Station Historic District =

Ranger station in Glacier National Park

- U.S. National Register of Historic Places
- U.S. Historic district
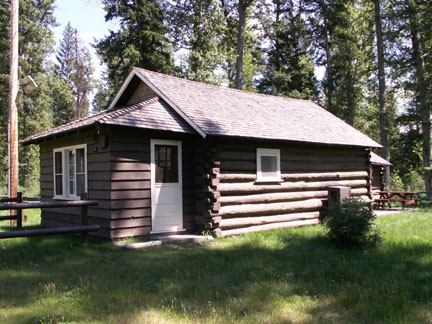
- Logging Creek Ranger Station

- Location within Montana Location within the United States
- Nearest city: West Glacier, Montana
- Coordinates: 48°41′53″N 114°11′29″W
- Built: 1907
- Architect: NPS
- MPS: Glacier National Park MRA
- NRHP reference No.: 86003697
- Added to NRHP: December 16, 1986

The Logging Creek Ranger Station is the oldest continually operating administrative site in Glacier National Park. The rustic log cabin is an early example of what would become a typical style of western park structure. The district includes a cabin used as a residence for the summer fire guard.

The site would have been among those inundated by the proposed Glacier View Dam, which would have flooded much of the North Fork Flathead River valley, including park lands. Proposed in the 1940s, the dam was never built.
