= Kishenehn Ranger Station Historic District =

Ranger station

- U.S. National Register of Historic Places
- U.S. Historic district
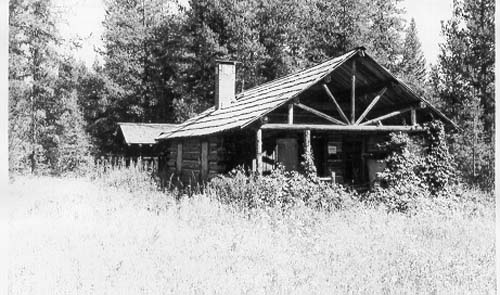

- Location within Montana Location within the United States
- Nearest city: West Glacier, Montana
- Coordinates: 48°57′37″N 114°25′14″W
- Built: 1921
- MPS: Glacier National Park MRA
- NRHP reference No.: 86000335
- Added to NRHP: February 14, 1986

The Kishenehn Ranger Station in Glacier National Park was originally built in 1913, but a fire burned it down in 1919. They rebuilt it in 1921. Located nearly five miles south of the Canada–United States border, the log cabin was one of the earliest administrative structures in the park. The cabin was designed in an early version of what became the National Park Service Rustic style.

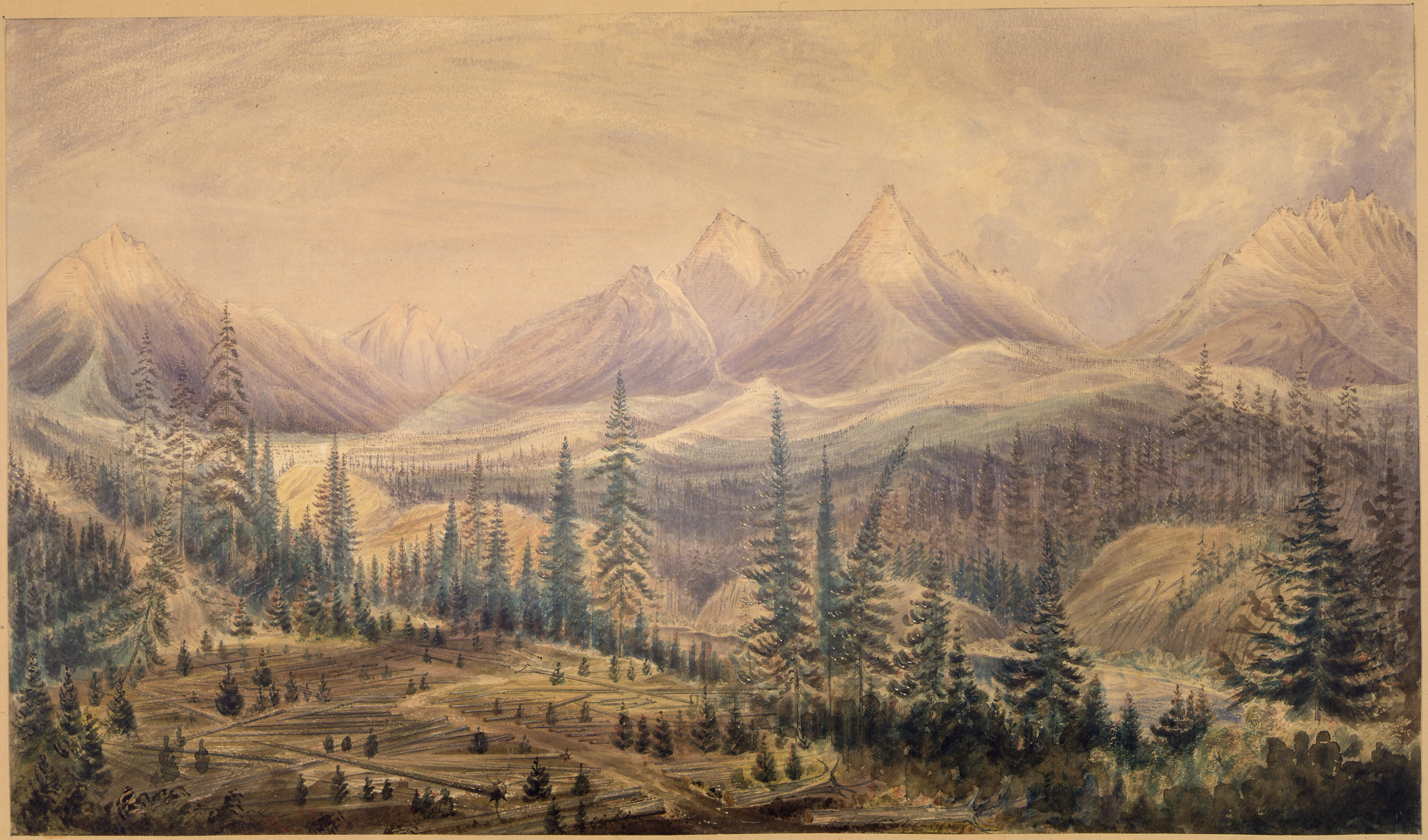
Valley of Kishenehn Creek
