= Polebridge Ranger Station Historic District =

Ranger station

- U.S. National Register of Historic Places
- U.S. Historic district
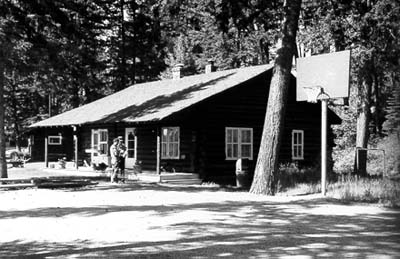

- Location within Montana Location within the United States
- Nearest city: West Glacier, Montana
- Coordinates: 48°46′56″N 114°16′43″W
- Built: 1922
- MPS: Glacier National Park MRA
- NRHP reference No.: 86000337
- Added to NRHP: February 14, 1986

The Polebridge Ranger Station in Glacier National Park was the first administrative area in the park, predating the park's establishment. The ranger station was destroyed by fire, leaving the residence.

The historic district originally comprised five cabins, a barn, oil house, a woodshed converted to a checking station, garage, generator house, fire cache, washhouse, and the Strissel Residence, moved to the site in 1975. Many of the other structures were moved to the site in 1955. The fire cache was built at the site in 1927, with a greater level of detailing than was usual in such structures. The 1927 log barn was a significant existing structure.

The only survivors of the 1988 Red Bench Fire were the checking station and the ranger station residence. The residence is a log structure, built in 1922.
