= Saint Mary Ranger Station =

- U.S. National Register of Historic Places
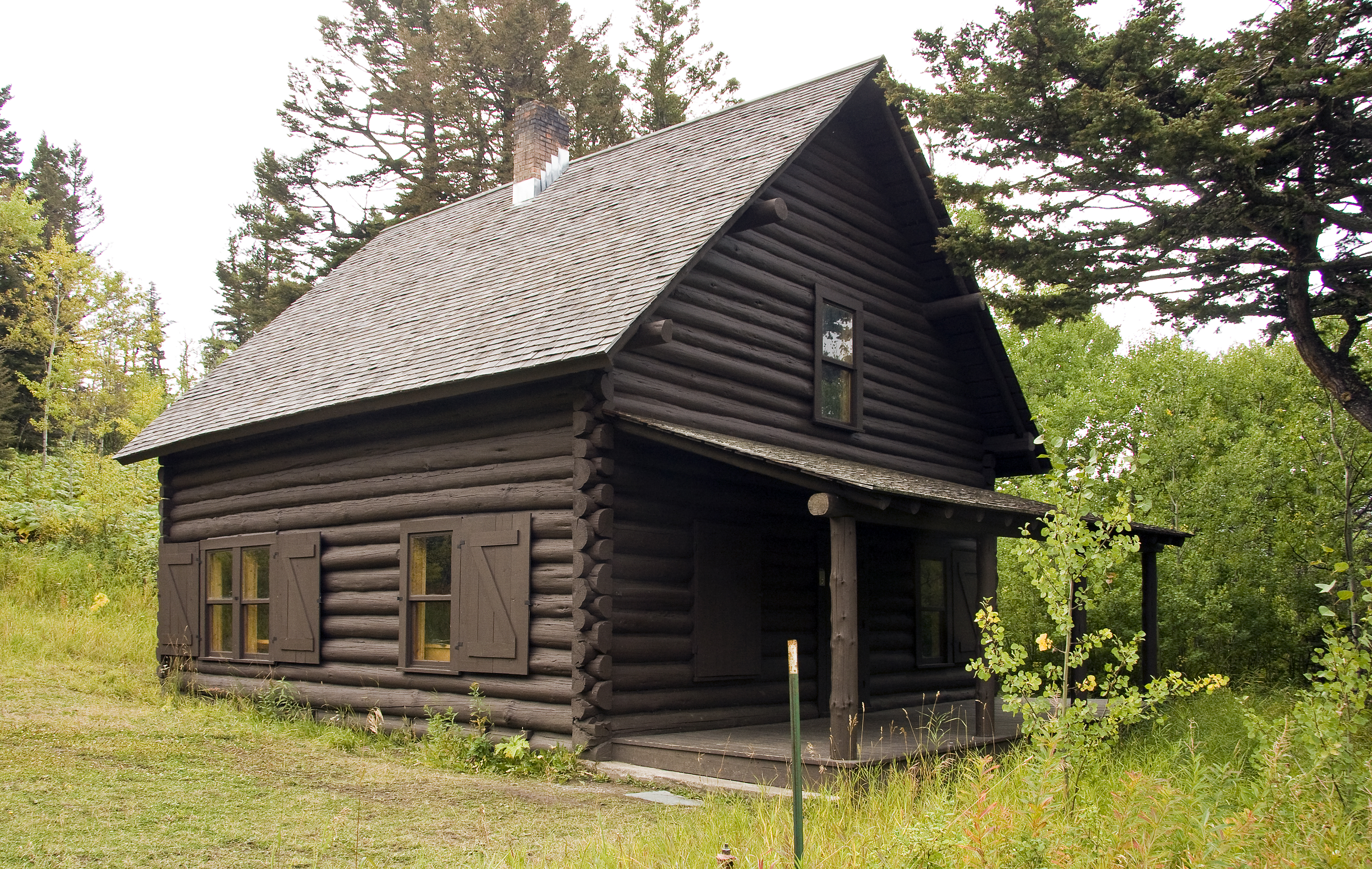

- Location within Montana Location within the United States
- Nearest city: St. Mary, Montana
- Coordinates: 48°44′16″N 113°25′40″W
- Area: 0.3 acres (0.12 ha)
- Built: 1913
- Architectural style: Rustic, log construction
- MPS: Glacier National Park MRA
- NRHP reference No.: 86000367
- Added to NRHP: February 14, 1986

The Saint Mary Ranger Station (or St. Mary) is a ranger station in Glacier National Park in the U.S. state of Montana. The log cabin was built in 1913 on the east side of the park overlooking Upper Saint Mary Lake. The oldest administrative structures in the park., it features an architecture that foreshadows the National Park Service Rustic style.

== History ==
The Saint Mary Ranger Station was built in 1913 by the district's first resident ranger, with the assistance of local residents, three years before the National Park Service was established while the park was being directly administered by the Department of the Interior. The present ranger station complex comprises two buildings standing by themselves in a small sloping meadow just to the east of the lake. The ranger station cabin is on its original site, with the former Lubec Ranger Station barn nearby. The barn, built in 1926, was moved to Saint Mary in 1977, where both structures were used as a living history exhibit. The Lubec barn replaces the site's original barn, built in 1915 and demolished in the early 1960s. The barn, as a building moved from its original site, is not included under the historic designation.

The cabin was stabilized in 1972 and placed on a new concrete foundation. Further restoration was undertaken in 1975 in preparation for the 1976 United States Bicentennial. The interior was restored to its presumed original configuration, and interior sheathing was replaced. Restoration guidance and furnishings were provided by Mrs. Chance Beebe, who lived at the station 1918-1919 when her husband Chance was a ranger at Saint Mary.

== Description ==
The ranger station is a 26-foot (7.9 m) by 26-foot (7.9 m) cabin, 1-1/2 stories high with a front gable and a lean-to porch across the front. The cabin originally rested on wood piles. The walls are of rounded log construction, squared on the inside and then sheathed with beaded panels for the interior finish. There are three rooms on the cabin's main level: a living room in the front and a bedroom and kitchen in the back. The attic is an unfinished space, reached by an enclosed stairway from the living space below. An excavated root cellar is under the kitchen. The 1-1/2 story high log construction at the gable ends is unusual in a building of this type, where the triangular gable areas are usually filled in with framing and shingles.

A 1932 lean-to addition containing a bathroom and storage area was demolished in the 1977 renovation. A number of outbuildings that formerly existed around the cabin were removed during the 1970s.

The Lubec barn, that presently stands as an outbuilding on the Saint Mary Ranger Station site, came from the Lubec Ranger Station formerly located in the proximity of the Lubec trailhead about 7 miles south of East Glacier. In summer 1977, the barn was deconstructed at the Lubec Ranger Station site as part of an historical restoration project led by Montclair State College faculty member, Harrison Goodall, two family members, and 15 students. The disassembled barn was transported to and reassembled piece-by-piece on a new stone/concrete foundation at the Saint Mary Ranger Station site. The project took two weeks for disassembly, tagging and recording, and transportation of logs and other original construction materials. Only hand tools were used for reconstruction, which took about four weeks. Approximately eight replacement logs were tagged with "1977" plates. The Lubec barn is larger than the original Saint Mary barn, 19 feet (5.8 m) by 26 feet (7.9 m) versus 15 feet (4.6 m) by 18 feet (5.5 m).

The Saint Mary Ranger Station was placed on the National Register of Historic Places on February 14, 1986.
