= West Glacier, Montana =

Unincorporated community in Montana, United States

- Census-designated place
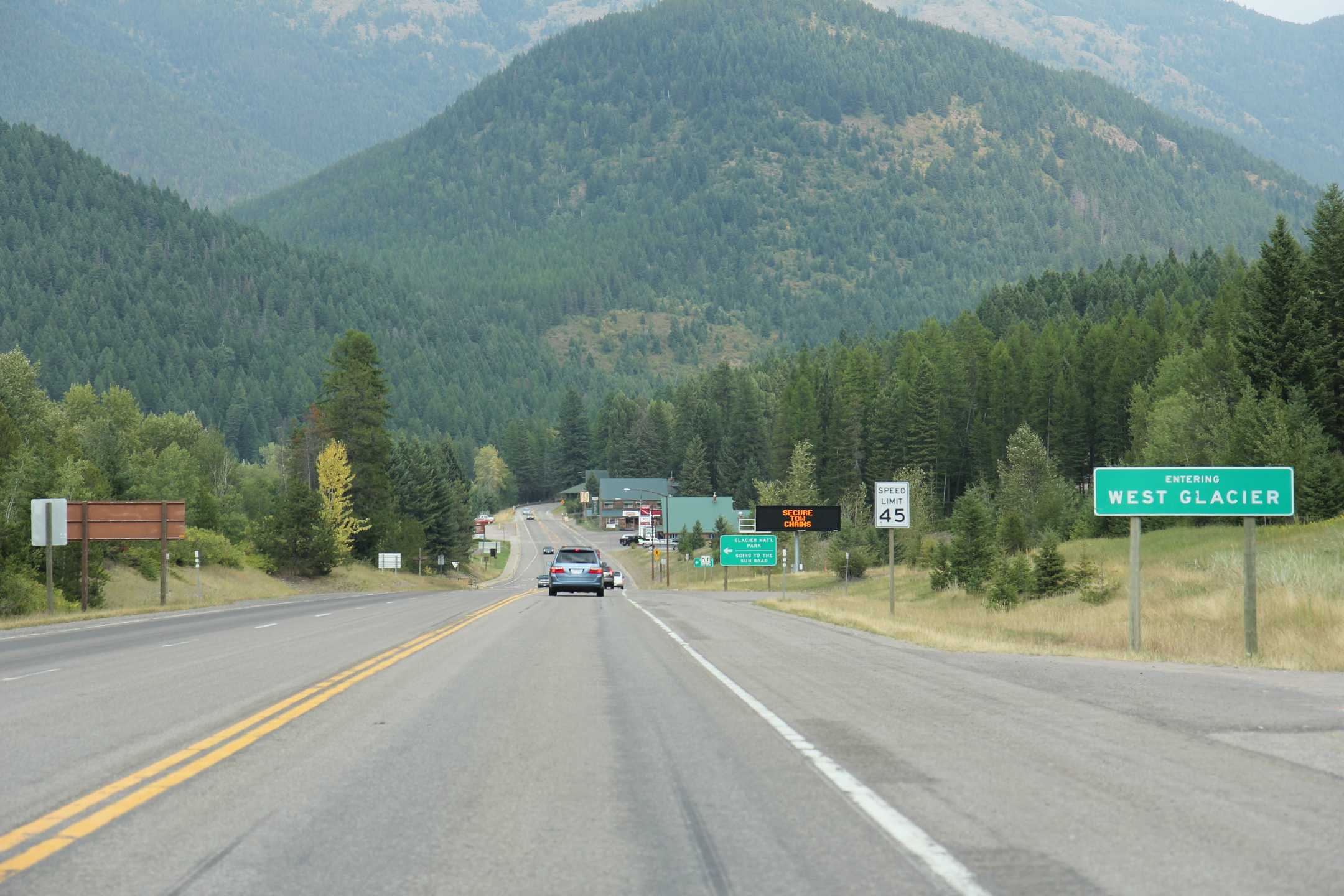
- Sign for West Glacier on US Route 2

- Location within Montana
- Coordinates: 48°29′35″N 113°58′43″W
- Country: United States
- State: Montana
- County: Flathead

Area
  - Total: 4.22 sq mi (10.92 km^{2})
  - Land: 4.14 sq mi (10.73 km^{2})
  - Water: 0.073 sq mi (0.19 km^{2})
- Elevation: 3,202 ft (976 m)

Population (2020)
  - Total: 221
  - Density: 53/sq mi (20.6/km^{2})
- Time zone: UTC-7 (Mountain (MST))
  - Summer (DST): UTC-6 (MDT)
- ZIP codes: 59921, 59936
- Area code: 406
- FIPS code: 30-79075
- GNIS feature ID: 2583863

West Glacier is an unincorporated community and census-designated place (CDP) in eastern Flathead County, Montana, United States. As of the 2020 census it had a population of 221. The town is at the west entrance to Glacier National Park and is located on U.S. Route 2 and a main line of the BNSF Railway. The headquarters complex for Glacier National Park is located nearby.

== History ==
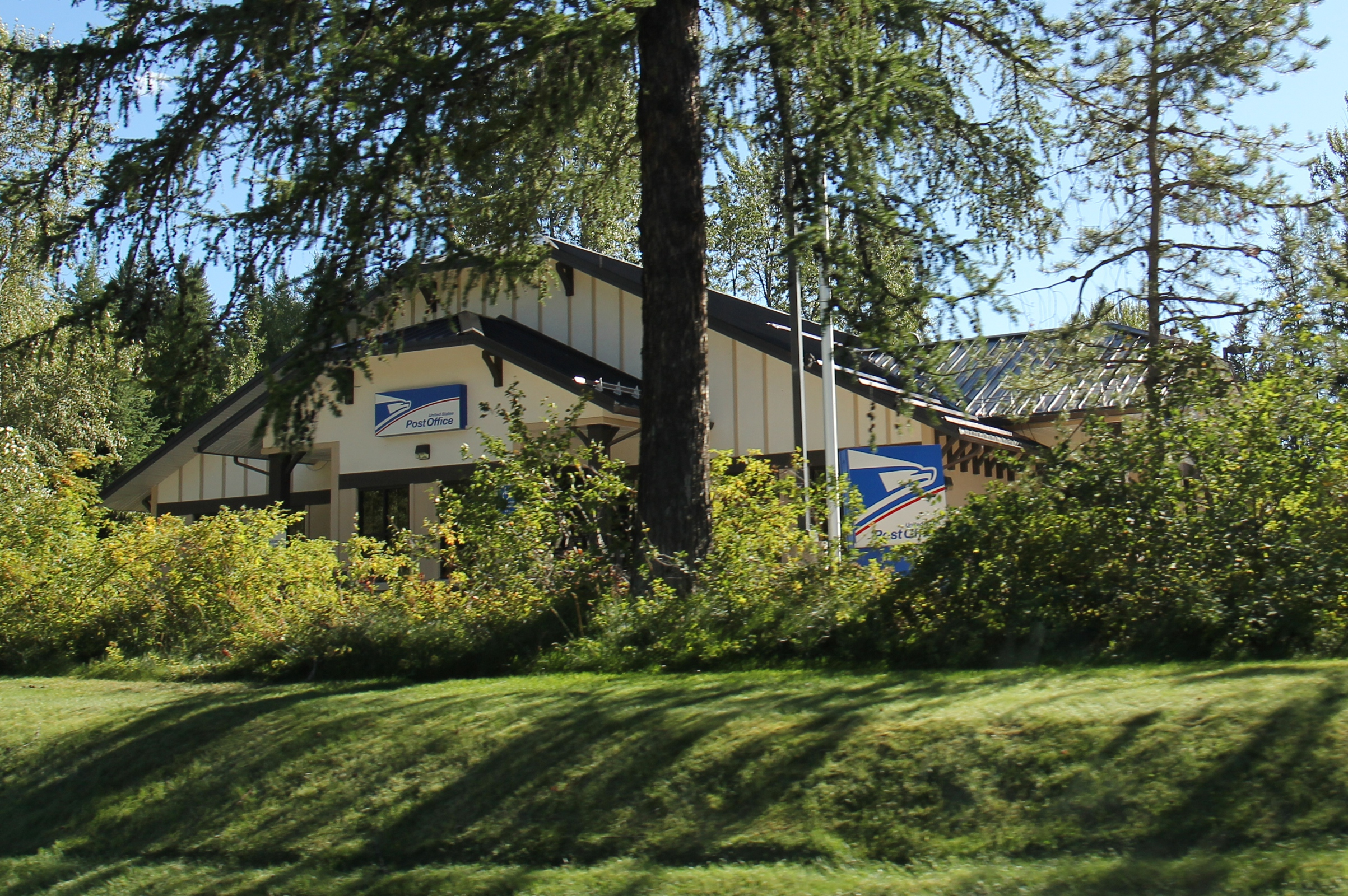
U.S. post office at West Glacier

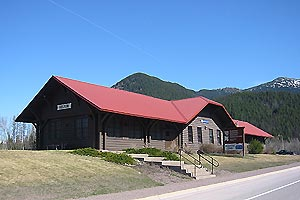
West Glacier's former Great Northern Railway station, now used by Amtrak

Remote and almost inaccessible, the West Glacier area drew only limited attention by white settlers until the main line of the Great Northern Railway (GNR) reached the northern Rocky Mountains in 1890. The transcontinental GNR was completed on January 6, 1893, at Scenic, Washington.

The railroad established a station named "Belton" at the current West Glacier site, and a small community slowly began to develop in the area. A post office was established at Belton in 1900. The number of homesteaders and other settlers remained small, however, due to the region's rugged, heavily forested terrain.

The community, heavily dependent on tourism, has a small permanent population that expands significantly during the summer tourist season; most area businesses are likewise seasonal—including the 18-hole golf course—and are primarily geared towards travelers. The elevation is 3,169 feet (966 m).

The Swiss-style Belton Chalets in West Glacier, originally built in 1910, was the first Great Northern Railway hotel at Glacier National Park and would welcome guests arriving by train to the park, before they would travel into the park's back-country chalets and tent camps. During the Great Depression, the Belton Chalet housed the crews working on the Going-to-the-Sun Road. Over the years, the chalet housed many businesses, while today it is one of Montana's grandest historic hotels. The chalet survives today under new ownership and is a registered National Historic Landmark.

In 1949 the town changed its name from Belton to West Glacier to promote the tourism potential.

== Tourism ==
=== Railroad tourism ===
By the early twentieth century a small number of tourists had begun to visit the spectacular mountain landscapes east and north of Belton, and in 1910 that area was set aside as Glacier National Park. As the railway station nearest the area, Belton became a primary gateway to Glacier, and the park headquarters was established there. Currently Amtrak's Empire Builder makes stops daily at the West Glacier station.

=== Automobile tourism ===
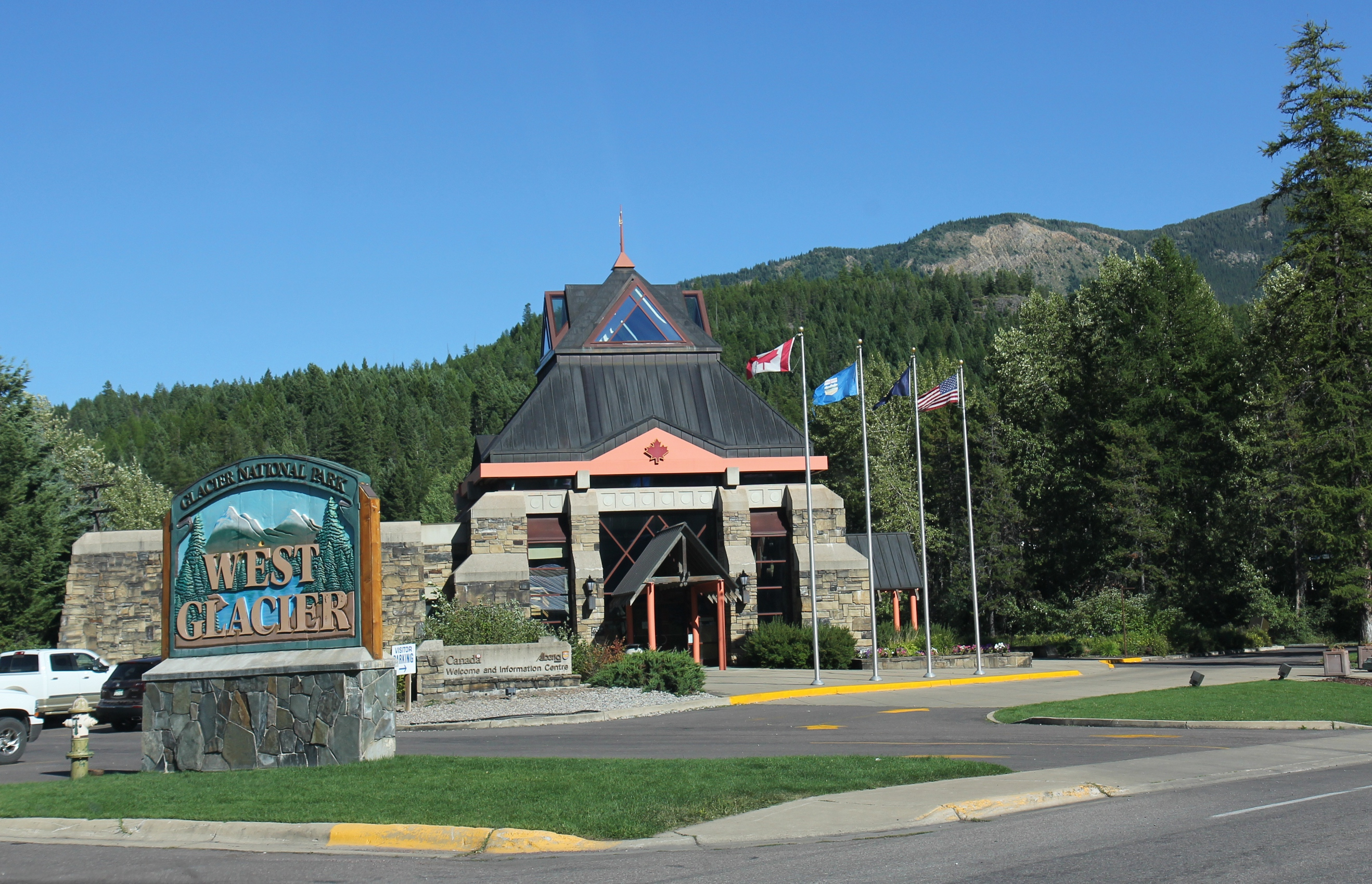
Travel Alberta Visitors Centre encouraging cross-border tourism

The growth of tourist traffic through Belton increased substantially in the 1920s and 1930s, largely due to the improvement of automobile routes through the area. U.S. Highway 2 was completed eastward from Belton over Marias Pass in 1930, and the Going-to-the-Sun Road was completed across Glacier Park in 1932. In 1938, a number of tourist-oriented businesses were constructed at the western end of the Going-to-the-Sun Road in Belton, forming the core of a new commercial district for the town. These businesses, owned by the Lundgren family since 1946, remain today.

The town of Belton was renamed "West Glacier" in 1949, to better reflect its geographic location and make it more identifiable to tourists, although the railroad station and chalet complex retained the Belton name.

== Demographics ==
Historical population
Census	Pop.	Note	%±
2010	227		—
2020	221		−2.6%
U.S. Decennial Census

== Climate ==
According to the Köppen Climate Classification, it is a warm summer continental climate (Dfb), bordering a continental warm summer Mediterranean climate (Dsb).

Climate data for West Glacier, Montana, 1991–2020 normals, extremes 1948–present
Month	Jan	Feb	Mar	Apr	May	Jun	Jul	Aug	Sep	Oct	Nov	Dec	Year
Record high °F (°C)	55 (13)	58 (14)	66 (19)	83 (28)	90 (32)	98 (37)	99 (37)	100 (38)	95 (35)	79 (26)	65 (18)	60 (16)	100 (38)
Mean maximum °F (°C)	42.3 (5.7)	44.9 (7.2)	55.5 (13.1)	69.4 (20.8)	80.3 (26.8)	85.7 (29.8)	90.8 (32.7)	90.8 (32.7)	82.7 (28.2)	69.3 (20.7)	52.1 (11.2)	41.7 (5.4)	92.6 (33.7)
Mean daily maximum °F (°C)	29.9 (−1.2)	33.6 (0.9)	42.5 (5.8)	52.6 (11.4)	64.1 (17.8)	70.4 (21.3)	80.2 (26.8)	79.4 (26.3)	68.0 (20.0)	51.7 (10.9)	37.0 (2.8)	29.2 (−1.6)	53.2 (11.8)
Daily mean °F (°C)	24.6 (−4.1)	26.5 (−3.1)	33.8 (1.0)	42.0 (5.6)	51.6 (10.9)	57.8 (14.3)	64.9 (18.3)	63.6 (17.6)	54.4 (12.4)	42.3 (5.7)	31.7 (−0.2)	24.5 (−4.2)	43.1 (6.2)
Mean daily minimum °F (°C)	19.3 (−7.1)	19.4 (−7.0)	25.1 (−3.8)	31.4 (−0.3)	39.0 (3.9)	45.1 (7.3)	49.6 (9.8)	47.9 (8.8)	40.8 (4.9)	32.9 (0.5)	26.4 (−3.1)	19.9 (−6.7)	33.1 (0.6)
Mean minimum °F (°C)	−7.3 (−21.8)	−3.1 (−19.5)	5.6 (−14.7)	19.9 (−6.7)	27.1 (−2.7)	34.6 (1.4)	39.4 (4.1)	36.9 (2.7)	29.3 (−1.5)	17.4 (−8.1)	7.0 (−13.9)	−1.6 (−18.7)	−16.1 (−26.7)
Record low °F (°C)	−39 (−39)	−32 (−36)	−30 (−34)	3 (−16)	13 (−11)	24 (−4)	31 (−1)	26 (−3)	18 (−8)	−3 (−19)	−17 (−27)	−36 (−38)	−39 (−39)
Average precipitation inches (mm)	3.54 (90)	2.17 (55)	2.58 (66)	2.15 (55)	2.62 (67)	3.80 (97)	1.39 (35)	1.17 (30)	1.96 (50)	3.05 (77)	3.23 (82)	3.21 (82)	30.87 (784)
Average snowfall inches (cm)	32.0 (81)	16.0 (41)	14.0 (36)	3.1 (7.9)	0.5 (1.3)	0.0 (0.0)	0.0 (0.0)	0.0 (0.0)	0.0 (0.0)	2.0 (5.1)	16.2 (41)	31.4 (80)	115.2 (293)
Average precipitation days (≥ 0.01 in)	17.9	14.5	15.0	13.9	13.6	14.9	8.5	6.8	9.6	13.6	16.3	17.8	162.4
Average snowy days (≥ 0.1 in)	13.9	10.5	6.2	1.8	0.3	0.0	0.0	0.0	0.0	1.0	6.7	14.2	54.6
Source: NOAA
