= National Register of Historic Places listings in Glacier County, Montana =

Location of Glacier County in Montana

This is a list of the National Register of Historic Places listings in Glacier County, Montana. It is intended to be a complete list of the properties and districts on the National Register of Historic Places in Glacier County, Montana, United States. The locations of National Register properties and districts for which the latitude and longitude coordinates are included below, may be seen in a map.

There are 39 properties and districts listed on the National Register in the county, including 3 National Historic Landmarks.

This National Park Service list is complete through NPS recent listings posted May 1, 2026.

== Listings county-wide ==
	Name on the Register	Image	Date listed	Location	City or town	Description
1	Babb-Piegan, Montana, Inspection Station	Babb-Piegan, Montana, Inspection Station	April 12, 2006 (#06000252)	U.S. Route 89 near the Canada–US border 48°59′35″N 113°22′47″W	Babb	The 1930s former border station, a log building about 1/4 mile south of current border station.
2	Belly River Ranger Station Historic District	Belly River Ranger Station Historic District	February 14, 1986 (#86000329)	Head of Belly River Valley; 48°55′56″N 113°42′40″W	West Glacier	
3	Camp Disappointment	Camp Disappointment	October 15, 1966 (#66000434)	12 miles northeast of Browning; 48°40′11″N 112°48′27″W	Browning	
4	Chief Mountain Border Station and Quarters	Chief Mountain Border Station and Quarters	May 20, 2008 (#06000744)	Montana Highway 17 at the Canada–US border in Glacier National Park; 48°59′48″N 113°39′37″W	Babb	
5	Cut Bank Municipal Airport and Army Air Force Base	Cut Bank Municipal Airport and Army Air Force Base	January 29, 2008 (#07001494)	Valier Highway; 48°36′27″N 112°21′59″W	Cut Bank	
6	Cut Bank Ranger Station Historic District	Cut Bank Ranger Station Historic District	January 19, 1996 (#95001566)	Northern side of Cut Bank Creek in Glacier National Park; 48°36′22″N 113°22′34″W	East Glacier	
7	East Glacier Ranger Station Historic District	East Glacier Ranger Station Historic District	December 16, 1986 (#86003696)	0.75 miles (1.21 km) north of East Glacier Park on Montana Highway 49; 48°26′51″N 113°13′25″W	East Glacier	part of the Glacier National Park MRA
8	Glacier County Courthouse	Glacier County Courthouse	June 25, 2013 (#13000446)	512 East Main Street; 48°37′57″N 112°19′35″W	Cut Bank	
9	Glacier National Park Tourist Trails-Inside Trail, South Circle, North Circle	Glacier National Park Tourist Trails-Inside Trail, South Circle, North Circle	January 19, 1996 (#95001579)	Inside Trail, South Circle and North Circle Trails; 48°41′41″N 113°33′46″W	St. Mary	
10	Glacier Park Women's Club	Glacier Park Women's Club	June 13, 2019 (#100004092)	1 Glacier Avenue; 48°26′34″N 113°13′05″W	East Glacier Park Village	Also known as East Glacier Library or Community Hall
11	Goathaunt Bunkhouse	Goathaunt Bunkhouse	January 19, 1996 (#95001568)	Southern end of Waterton Lake in Glacier National Park; 48°57′39″N 113°53′53″W	St. Mary	
12	Going-to-the-Sun Road	Going-to-the-Sun Road	June 16, 1983 (#83001070)	Glacier Route 1; 48°38′48″N 113°46′48″W	West Glacier	Extends into Flathead County
13	Great Northern Railway Buildings	Great Northern Railway Buildings	May 28, 1987 (#87001453)	Glacier National Park; 48°38′29″N 113°32′17″W	Glacier National Park	
14	Holy Family Mission	Holy Family Mission	June 14, 1982 (#82003170)	East of Browning; 48°28′55″N 112°44′24″W	Browning	
15	Kootenai Creek Snowshoe Cabin	Kootenai Creek Snowshoe Cabin	July 1, 1999 (#99000775)	Flattop Mountain along Kootenai Creek; 48°51′55″N 113°54′28″W	St. Mary	
16	Lee Creek Snowshoe Cabin	Lee Creek Snowshoe Cabin	March 2, 2001 (#01000203)	Northeastern corner of Glacier National Park; 48°59′10″N 113°37′20″W	Glacier National Park	
17	Little Chief (boat)	Little Chief (boat)	December 14, 2017 (#100001897)	Two Medicine Lake, Glacier National Park; 48°41′27″N 113°31′30″W	East Glacier Park vicinity	Duplicate listing for Rising Wolf, below.
18	Logan Pass Visitor Center	Logan Pass Visitor Center	April 15, 2008 (#08000334)	Going-to-the-Sun Rd., 18 miles west of U.S. Route 89; 48°41′43″N 113°43′04″W	St. Mary	
19	Many Glacier Barn and Bunkhouse	Many Glacier Barn and Bunkhouse	January 19, 1996 (#95001570)	Glacier Route 3 at Apikuni Flat in Glacier National Park; 48°48′04″N 113°38′33″W	St. Mary	
20	Many Glacier Campground Camptender's Cabin	Many Glacier Campground Camptender's Cabin	January 19, 1996 (#95001571)	Many Glacier in Glacier National Park; 48°47′49″N 113°40′37″W	St. Mary	
21	Many Glacier Hotel Historic District	Many Glacier Hotel Historic District	January 19, 1996 (#76000173)	West of Babb; 48°47′54″N 113°39′12″W	Babb	
22	Morning Eagle	Morning Eagle	July 23, 2018 (#100002691)	Josephine L., Glacier NP; 48°47′15″N 113°40′10″W	Babb	part of the Glacier National Park MRA
23	Pass Creek Snowshoe Cabin	Pass Creek Snowshoe Cabin	December 19, 1986 (#86003689)	Confluence of the Waterton River and Pass Creek; 48°53′47″N 113°54′23″W	Babb	part of the Glacier National Park MRA
24	Ptarmigan Tunnel	Ptarmigan Tunnel	February 14, 1986 (#86000360)	North of Ptarmigan Lake; 48°51′13″N 113°42′24″W	Babb	part of the Glacier National Park MRA
25	Rising Sun Auto Camp	Rising Sun Auto Camp	January 19, 1996 (#95001574)	500 feet north of Going-to-the-Sun Rd. at St. Mary Lake in Glacier National Park; 48°41′46″N 113°31′06″W	St. Mary	
26	Rising Wolf	Rising Wolf	November 14, 2016 (#16000772)	Glacier National Park; 48°41′27″N 113°31′30″W	St. Mary	1926 boat plying St. Mary Lake, now called Little Chief. Duplicate listing above under "Little Chief".
27	River View Dairy Barn		July 7, 2022 (#100007922)	1/2 mi. northwest of Cut Bank off Corrigeux Rd. 48°38′39″N 112°20′53″W	Cut Bank vicinity	
28	Roes Creek Campground Camptender's Cabin	Roes Creek Campground Camptender's Cabin	April 4, 1996 (#95001575)	North of Going-to-the-Sun Rd. at St. Mary Lake in Glacier National Park; 48°41′39″N 113°31′13″W	St. Mary	
29	Saint Mary Ranger Station	Saint Mary Ranger Station	February 14, 1986 (#86000367)	Eastern end of Upper Saint Mary Lake; 48°44′16″N 113°25′40″W	St. Mary	part of the Glacier National Park MRA
30	St. Mary Utility Area Historic District	St. Mary Utility Area Historic District	January 19, 1996 (#95001576)	East of St. Mary at Divide Creek in Glacier National Park; 48°44′17″N 113°25′45″W	St. Mary	
31	Saint Mary Visitor Center, Entrance Station and Checking Stations	Saint Mary Visitor Center, Entrance Station and Checking Stations	April 15, 2008 (#08000335)	Going-to-the-Sun Rd., 5 miles east of U.S. Route 89; 48°44′51″N 113°26′21″W	St. Mary	
32	Sherburne Ranger Station Historic District	Sherburne Ranger Station Historic District	December 16, 1986 (#86003698)	Glacier Route 3 near Glacier Entrance; 48°49′19″N 113°34′45″W	Babb	part of the Glacier National Park MRA
33	Slide Lake-Otatso Creek Patrol Cabin and Woodshed	Slide Lake-Otatso Creek Patrol Cabin and Woodshed	February 14, 1986 (#86000370)	Northern side of Otatso Creek; 48°54′36″N 113°35′56″W	Babb	part of the Glacier National Park MRA
34	Sun Camp Fireguard Cabin	Sun Camp Fireguard Cabin	July 1, 1999 (#99000776)	Going-to-the-Sun Rd. 48°41′11″N 113°35′13″W	St. Mary	Destroyed by a wildfire in 2015
35	Swanson Boathouse	Swanson Boathouse	January 19, 1996 (#95001577)	Eastern shore of Two Medicine Lake in Glacier National Park; 48°28′59″N 113°22′07″W	East Glacier	
36	Swiftcurrent Auto Camp Historic District	Swiftcurrent Auto Camp Historic District	January 19, 1996 (#95001578)	Western end of Glacier Route 3 in Glacier National Park; 48°47′54″N 113°40′33″W	Many Glacier	
37	Swiftcurrent Ranger Station Historic District	Swiftcurrent Ranger Station Historic District	December 19, 1986 (#86003690)	Off Route 3 near Swiftcurrent Lake; 48°47′48″N 113°40′26″W	Babb	part of the Glacier National Park MRA
38	Two Medicine Campground Camptender's Cabin	Two Medicine Campground Camptender's Cabin	January 19, 1996 (#95001580)	Two Medicine Lake in Glacier National Park; 48°29′18″N 113°21′54″W	East Glacier	
39	Two Medicine General Store	Two Medicine General Store	February 14, 1986 (#86000372)	Eastern shore of Two Medicine Lake; 48°29′06″N 113°22′08″W	East Glacier	part of the Glacier National Park MRA

== See also ==
- List of National Historic Landmarks in Montana
- National Register of Historic Places listings in Montana
- National Register of Historic Places listings in Glacier National Park
