= Red Eagle Mountain =

Mountain in Montana, United States

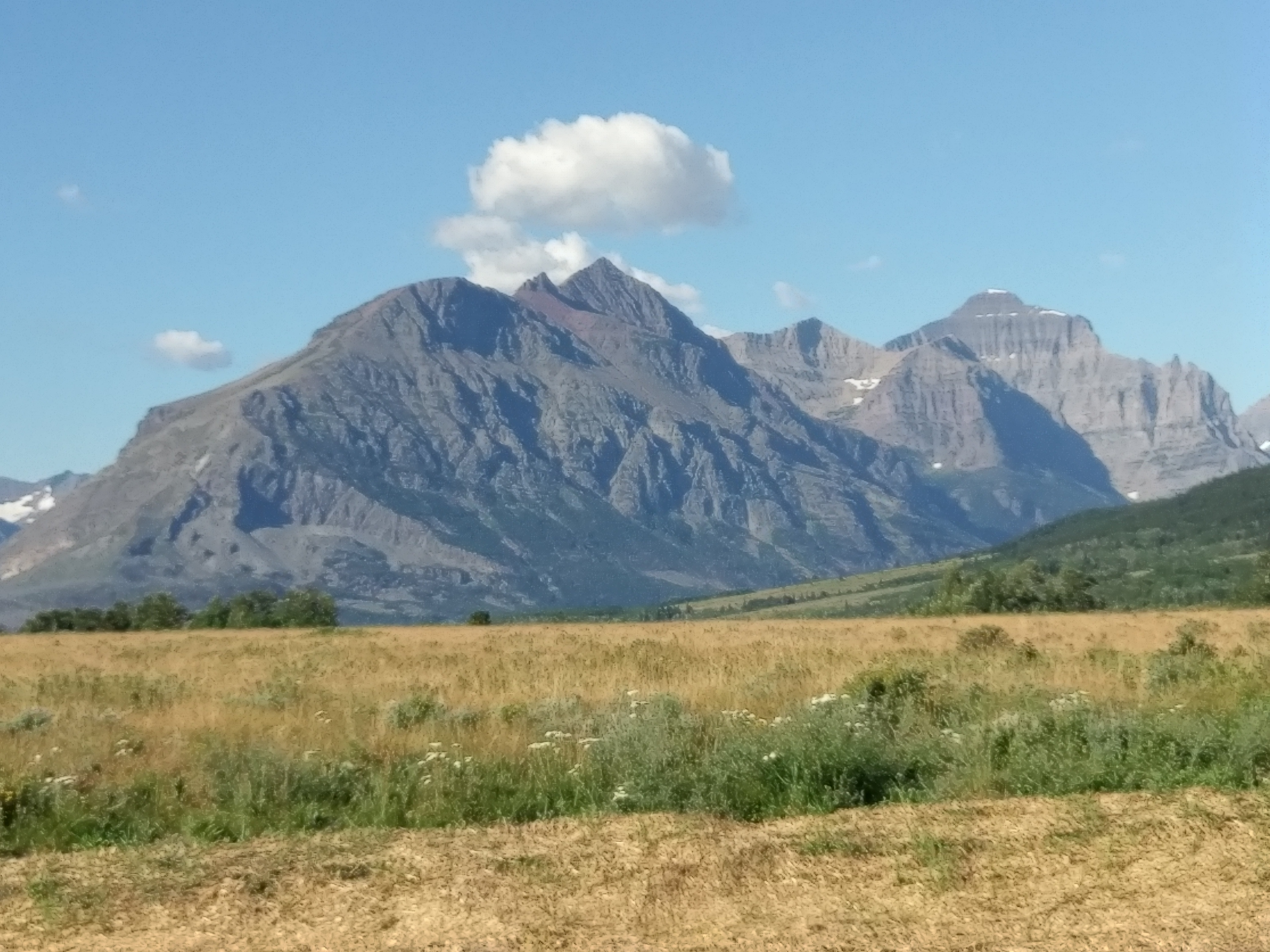
- Red Eagle Mountain below cloud from St. Mary, Montana

Highest point
- Elevation: 8,881 ft (2,707 m)
- Prominence: 801 ft (244 m)
- Coordinates: 48°39′16″N 113°32′55″W

Geography
- Location within Montana Location within the United States
- Location: Glacier County, Montana, U.S.
- Parent range: Lewis Range
- Topo map(s): USGS Rising Sun, MT

Red Eagle Mountain (8,881 feet (2,707 m)) is located in the Lewis Range, Glacier National Park in the U.S. state of Montana. Red Eagle Mountain rises more than 4,000 ft (1,200 m) above Saint Mary Lake and is easily seen from the Going-to-the-Sun Road and the entrance to the park from the village of St. Mary, Montana as well as at Rising Sun. The mountain was named according to James Willard Schultz, "by his Indian wife in 1887, for her uncle, Red Eagle, who had saved their son's life with his prayers to the Sun".

== Geology ==
Like other mountains in Glacier National Park, the peak is composed of sedimentary rock laid down during the Precambrian to Jurassic periods. Formed in shallow seas, this sedimentary rock was initially uplifted beginning 170 million years ago when the Lewis Overthrust fault pushed an enormous slab of precambrian rocks 3 mi (4.8 km) thick, 50 miles (80 km) wide and 160 miles (260 km) long over younger rock of the cretaceous period.

== Climate ==
Based on the Köppen climate classification, the peak is located in an alpine subarctic climate zone with long, cold, snowy winters, and cool to warm summers. Temperatures can drop below −10 °F with wind chill factors below −30 °F.

== Gallery ==
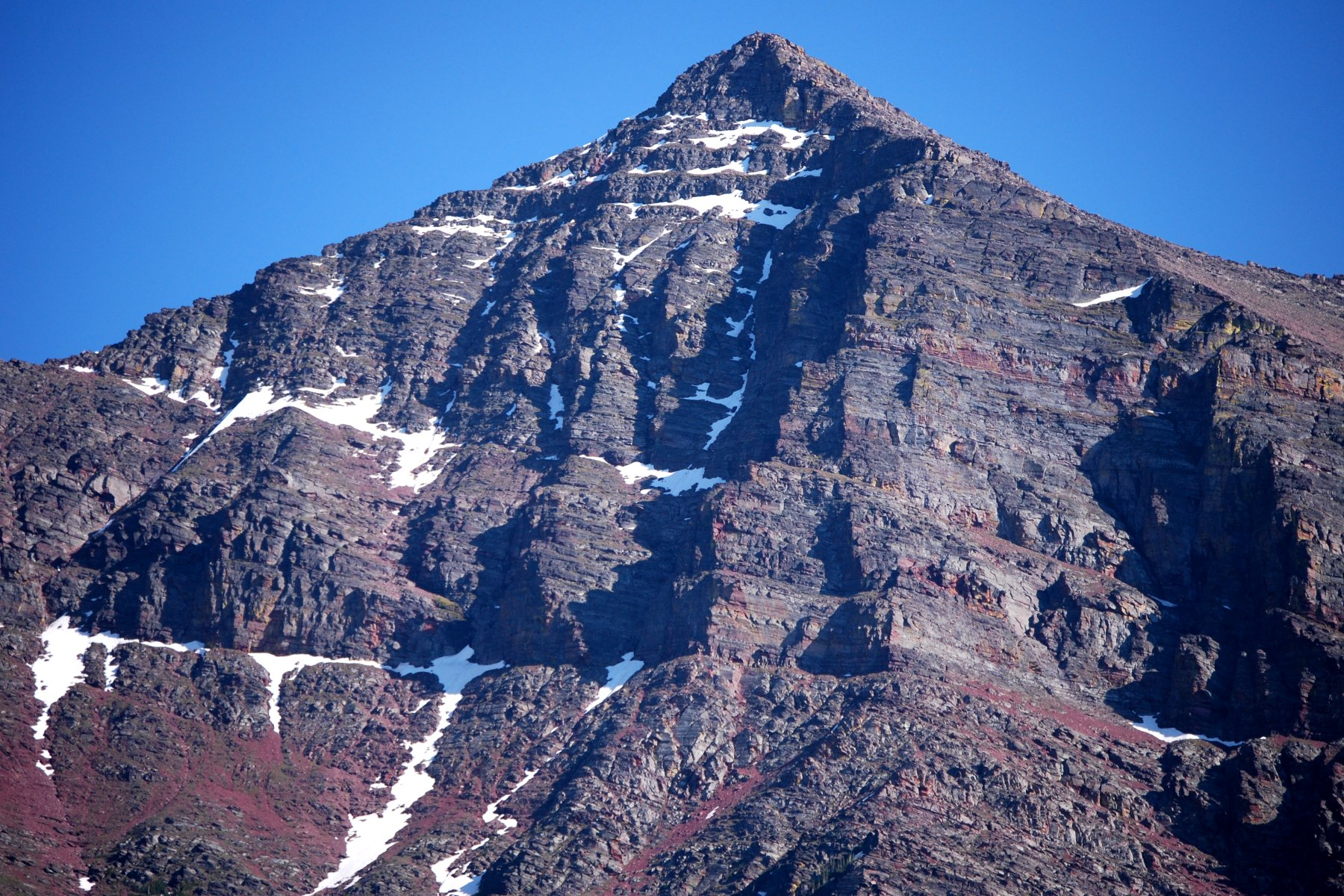
Red Eagle Mountain detail

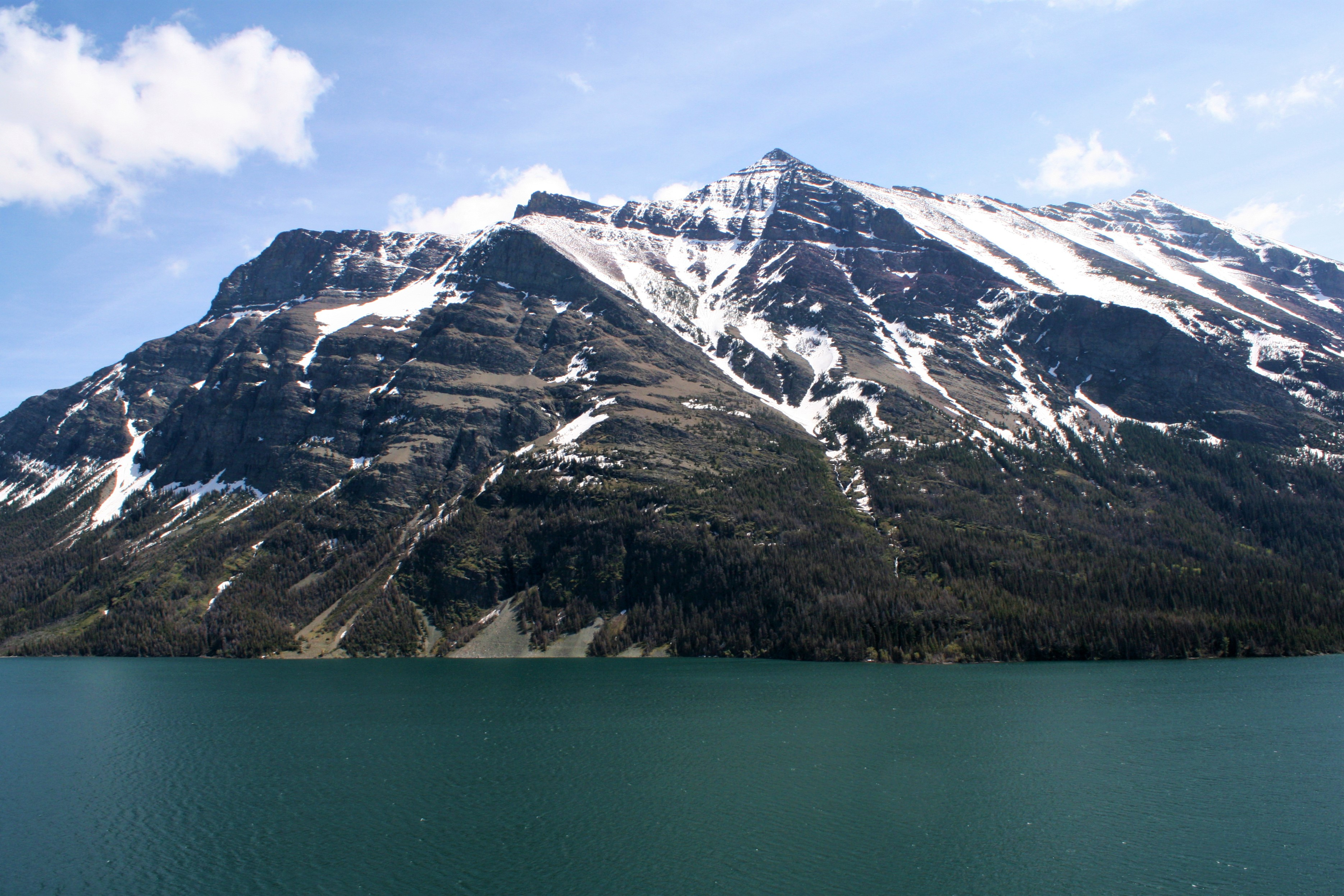
Red Eagle Mountain, north aspect from St. Mary Lake

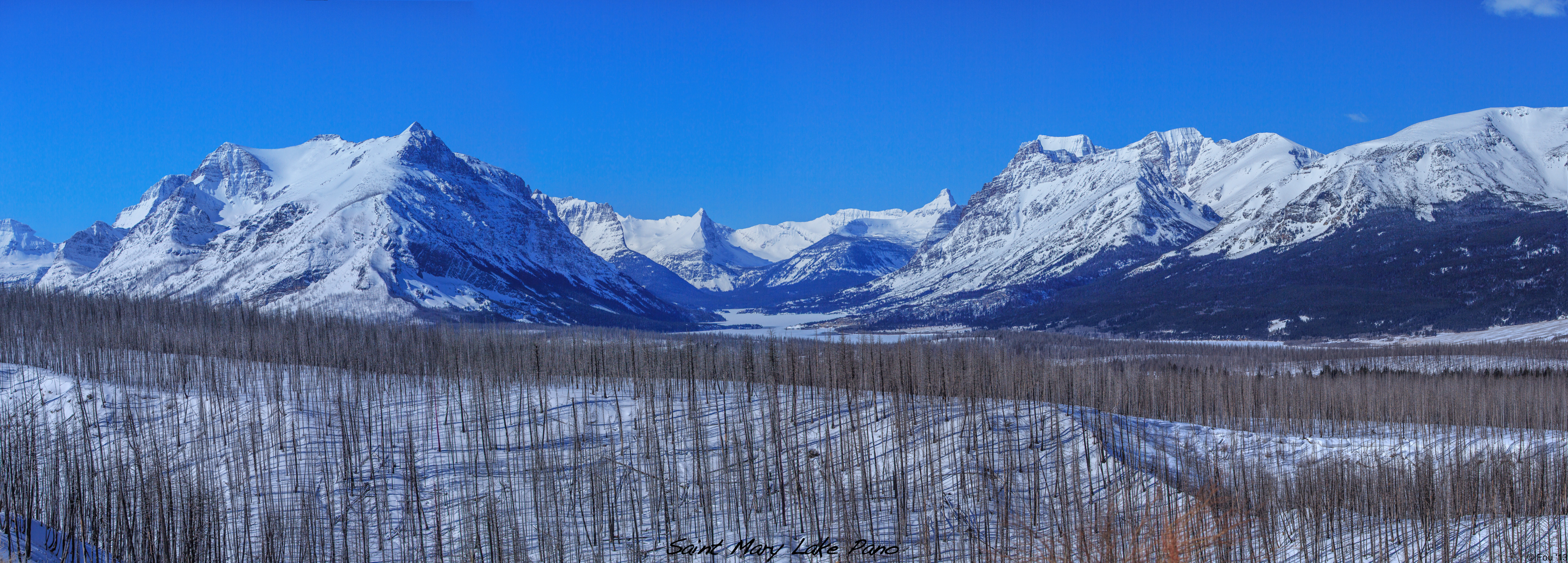
Red Eagle to the left side

== See also ==
- Mountains and mountain ranges of Glacier National Park (U.S.)
