= Going-to-the-Sun =

Going-to-the-Sun may refer to:

- Going-to-the-Sun Mountain, in Glacier National Park, Montana
- Going-to-the-Sun Road, an east–west highway across Glacier National Park, Montana
- "Going-to-the-Sun Road" (song), by Fleet Foxes
