= East Glacier =

East Glacier may refer to:

- East Glacier Park Village, Montana, a census-designated place (CDP) in Glacier County, Montana, United States.
- East Glacier Ranger Station Historic District
- East Glacier Park (Amtrak station), a seasonal station stop for the Amtrak Empire Builder in East Glacier Park, Montana.
