= Rising Sun Auto Camp =

U.S. historic place in Glacier National Park

- U.S. National Register of Historic Places
- U.S. Historic district
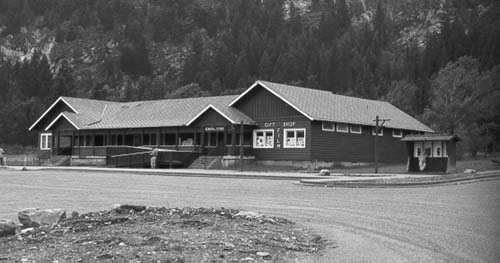

- Location within Montana Location within the United States
- Location: 500 ft. N of Going-to-the-Sun Rd. at St. Mary Lake, Glacier NP, St. Mary, Montana
- Coordinates: 48°41′46″N 113°31′6″W
- Architect: Glacier Park Hotel Co.
- MPS: Glacier National Park MPS
- NRHP reference No.: 95001574
- Added to NRHP: January 19, 1996

The Rising Sun Auto Camp, also known as the Roes Creek Auto Camp, East Glacier Auto Camp or simply Rising Sun preserves a portion of the built-up area of Glacier National Park that documents the second phase of tourist development in the park. Rising Sun is located along the Going-to-the-Sun Road, approximately 7 miles (11 km) from the east entrance to Glacier National Park, Montana, United States. Rising Sun is a wayside area that has a National Park Service campground, a camp store and gift shop, picnic area, restaurant, as well as a motel and guest cabins which are managed by the park's concessionaire, Xanterra Parks & Resorts. In the immediate area, there is also a boat dock as well as sightseeing boats which allow visitors to tour Saint Mary Lake, the second largest lake in the park. "The most popular spot for [Glacier] tourists is Rising Sun, an overlook of Goose Island in St. Mary Lake and one of the most photographed spots in the park."

== Establishment ==
After the creation of a series of hotels for train-borne visitors, courtesy of the Great Northern Railway's hotel concession, facilities were developed for the increasing numbers of automobile-borne tourists, drawn to Glacier by the Going-to-the-Sun Road. The Rising Sun Auto Camp was created for these new tourists. Located in the Rising Sun region of the park, it includes a rustic general store, built in 1941 by the Glacier Park Hotel Company, surrounded by a number of log tourist cabins., as well as a shower and laundry house and other supporting structures.

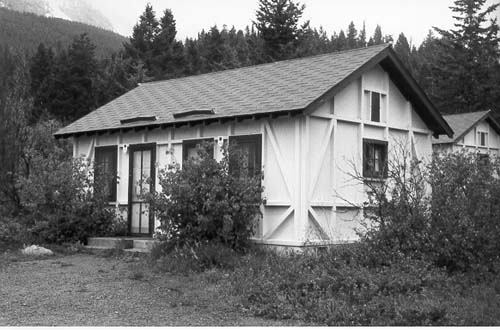
Rising Sun tourist cabin

The Rising Sun Motor Inn and Cabins preserves historic paintings donated by Glacier Park, Inc. The pieces were originally owned and/or commissioned by the Great Northern Railway, and many depict iconic scenes from in and around Glacier National Park. All are estimated to have originated between 1909 and 1915 and created by John Fery, Frank Stick, R.H. Palenske and Charles Defeo.

== Nearby features ==
The Sun Camp Fireguard Cabin also known as the Baring Cabin was destroyed by the Reynolds Creek Wildland Fire in July 2015.

The Sun Camp Fireguard Cabin and the Rising Sun Auto Camp are listed on the National Register of Historic Places.

== See also ==
- Swiftcurrent Auto Camp Historic District
- Roes Creek Campground Camptender's Cabin
