= Little Chief (boat) =

- Rising Wolf
- U.S. National Register of Historic Places
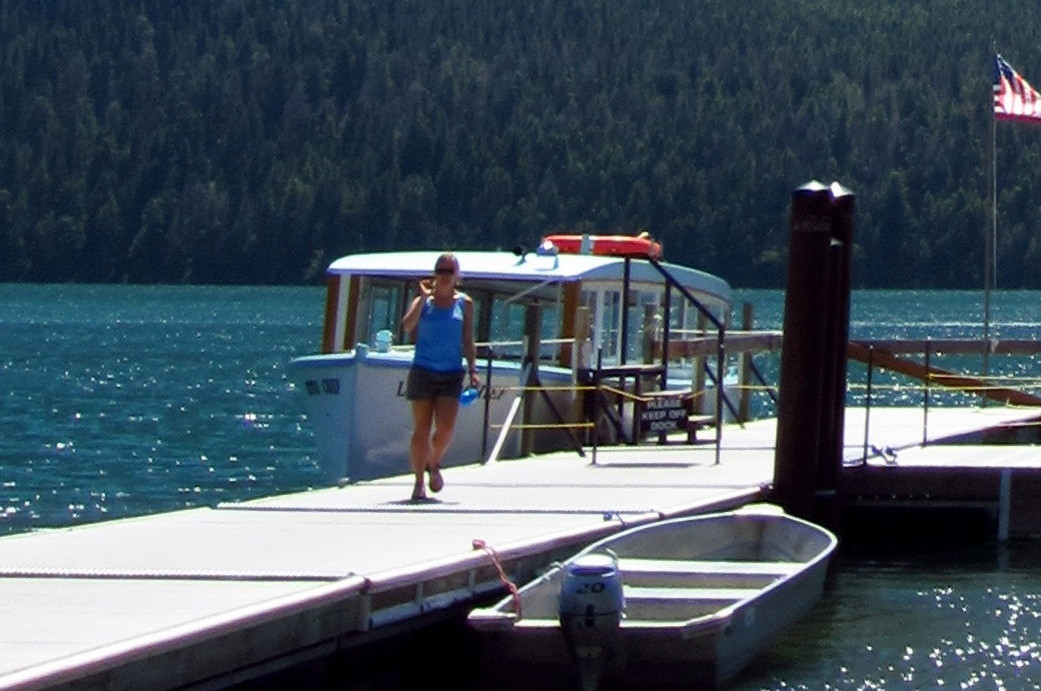

- Location within Montana Location within the United States
- Location: Glacier National Park, St. Mary, Glacier County, Montana
- Coordinates: 48.690813°N 113.525111°W
- Built by: John William Swanson
- NRHP reference No.: 16000772
- Added to NRHP: November 14, 2016

Little Chief is a 1926 boat plying Saint Mary Lake, renamed from Rising Wolf in 1990 after a major restoration. It is a 45 feet (14 m) long boat which is 12 feet (3.7 m) wide, made of planked cedar on an oak frame. Its stem and keel are made of fir and it has a steel stem band.

It is USCG-rated to carry 49 passengers and two crew members, and is registered at 13 gross tons and 10 net tons.

It was listed on the National Register of Historic Places in 2016 as "Rising Wolf".

The "Little Chief" name is a reference to Little Chief Mountain.
