= Camas Creek Cutoff Road =

Road in Montana

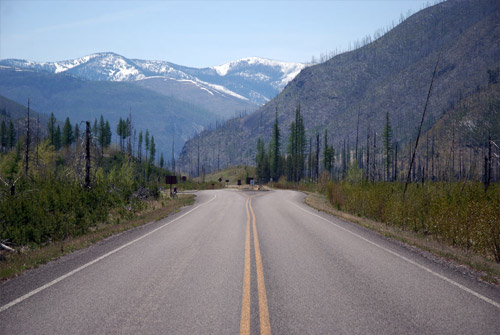
Camas Creek Cutoff Road at the entrance To Glacier National Park

The Camas Creek Cutoff Road (also known as Camas Road) is an 11.7 mile long road located in Glacier National Park. The road connects the Going-To-The-Sun Road to the east with the North Fork Road to the west. The road is not highly trafficked and does not access many major park attractions.

== History ==
Most of the land covered by Camas Road was inaccessible by vehicle prior to its construction. Construction of the Camas Creek Cutoff Road began in 1960 and was completed in 1967 at a total cost of $2.5 million. The Camas Creek Cutoff Road was constructed as a segment of the proposed International Loop Road, which would have connected Glacier National Park with Waterton Lakes National Park. This project was never completed because of land acquisition issues on the US side and a lack of commitment on the Canadian side, Canada being more focused on potential logging operations in the region.

The road was created as a part of the National Park Service's Mission 66, which aimed to improve visitor services at parks. It is seen as by the National Park Service and as a positive example of what Mission 66 and the Bureau of Public Roads (presently the Federal Highway Administration) were able to accomplish. On July 17, 2017 the road was added to the list of National Register of Historic Places.
