= Going-to-the-Sun Mountain =

Mountain in Montana, United States

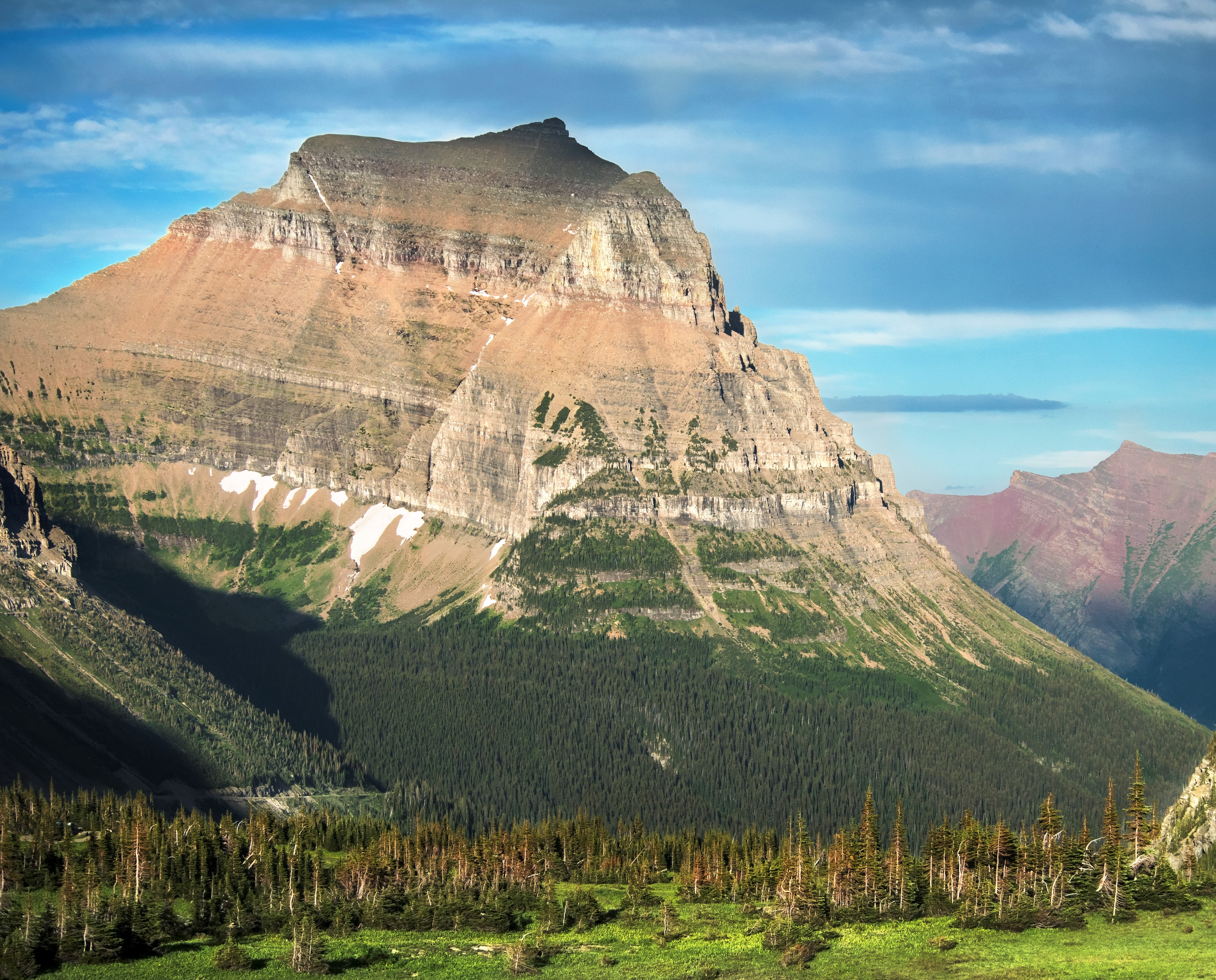
- Going-to-the-Sun Mountain

Highest point
- Elevation: 9,647 ft (2,940 m)
- Prominence: 1,892 ft (577 m)
- Parent peak: Cracker Peak
- Listing: Mountains in Glacier County
- Coordinates: 48°41′27″N 113°38′11″W

Geography
- Location within Montana Location within the United States
- Location: Glacier National Park; Glacier County, Montana, U.S.
- Parent range: Lewis Range
- Topo map: USGS Logan Pass

Climbing
- First ascent: 1907
- Easiest route: Hike, scramble class 4

Going-to-the-Sun Mountain is a 9,647-foot (2,940 m) mountain peak located in Glacier National Park in the U.S. state of Montana. It rises dramatically above St. Mary Valley just north of the Going-to-the-Sun Road. The mountain was named by James Willard Schultz in 1888.

== Origin of name ==
During the winter of 1887–1888, James Willard Schultz, an early hunting guide in the St. Mary Lakes region, and his family built a cabin on the north shore of upper Saint Mary Lake. While hunting on Red Eagle Mountain with his Pikuni friend, Tail-Feathers-Coming-Over-the-Hill, Schultz gave this mountain the name it bears today. Warren Hanna, Schultz's biographer describes the naming thus:

It was during this winter that Schultz and Tail-Feathers-Coming-Over-the-Hill killed a bighorn ram on Red Eagle Mountain. When they finished butchering it, they build a small fire and sat down beside it for a leisurely smoke. As they took turns puffing on Tail-Feather's long-stemmed black stone pipe, Schultz noticed that his friend was gazing constantly at a particularly beautiful mountain across the lake. Finally, he commented to Schultz: How very high it is, its summit far up into the blue. Of all the mountains that I have ever seen I think it is the most beautiful. Were I younger and were it summertime, how I would like to climb up and lie on its summit, and fast, and pray Sun for a vision. Schultz, too, had admired that particular peak and had considered it the finest in the area. Often he had tried to think of a name for it that would be fitting, and now Tail-Feathers had given him an idea. The mountain should have some relationship to Sun, the most important of all the gods of the Blackfoot tribe. After pondering the matter for a while, Schultz turned to Tail-Feathers and said: We will name that mountain. Let us call it Going-to-the-Sun Mountain. With which suggestion Tail-Feathers was in complete accord, saying Good, That is a powerful, sacred name; it could not have a better one.

— Warren Hanna, The Life and Times of James Willard Schultz, 1986

Alternatively, numerous Blackfeet Indian legends are credited with the origins of the mountains' name. Used by the Blackfeet as a location for vision quests, it is one of the most accessible major mountain peaks in Glacier National Park. According to several sources, the actual Blackfeet name for the mountain is The-Face-of-Sour-Spirit-Who-Went-Back-to-The-Sun-After-His-Work-Was-Done Mountain, in explanation of the snowfields on the mountainside which, as viewed from the west, make the outline of a face.

== Geology ==
Like other mountains in Glacier National Park, the mountain is composed of sedimentary rock laid down during the Precambrian to Jurassic periods. Formed in shallow seas, this sedimentary rock was initially uplifted beginning 170 million years ago when the Lewis Overthrust fault pushed an enormous slab of precambrian rocks 3 mi (4.8 km) thick, 50 miles (80 km) wide and 160 miles (260 km) long over younger rock of the cretaceous period.

== Climate ==
According to the Köppen climate classification system, the mountain is located in an alpine subarctic climate zone with long, cold, snowy winters, and cool to warm summers. Winter temperatures can drop below −10 °F with wind chill factors below −30 °F. Due to its altitude, it receives precipitation all year, as snow in winter, and as thunderstorms in summer. Precipitation runoff from the mountain drains into tributaries of the Saint Mary River.

Images of Going to the Sun Mountain
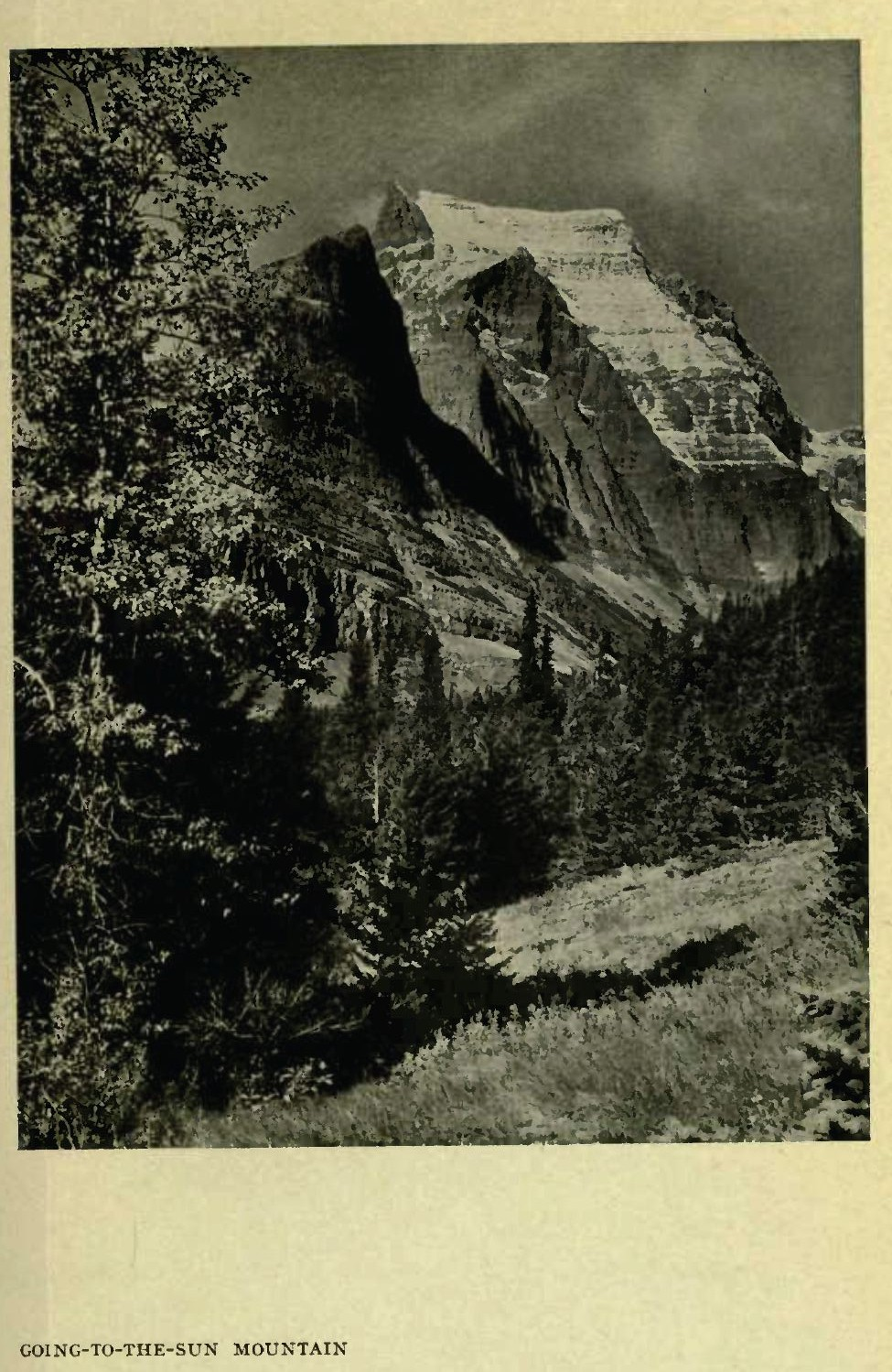
1917

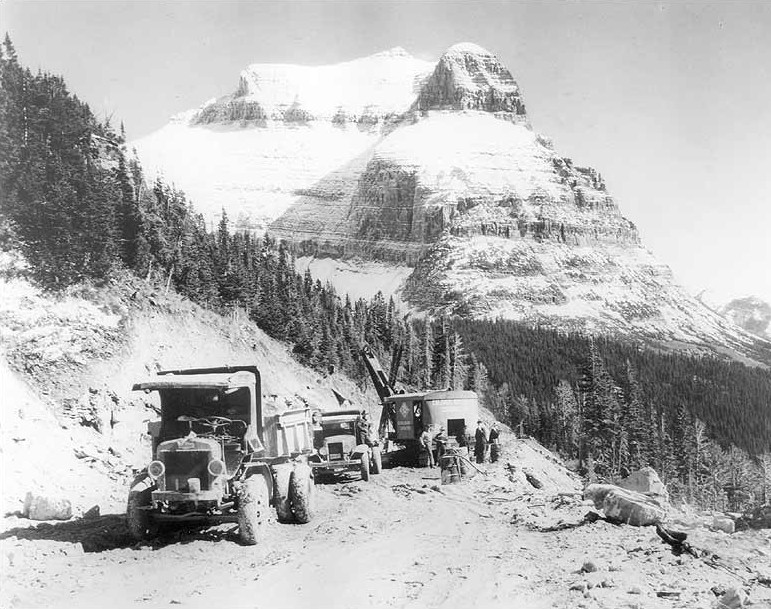
Road construction along the Going-to-the-Sun Road with Going to the Sun Mountain in background, 1932

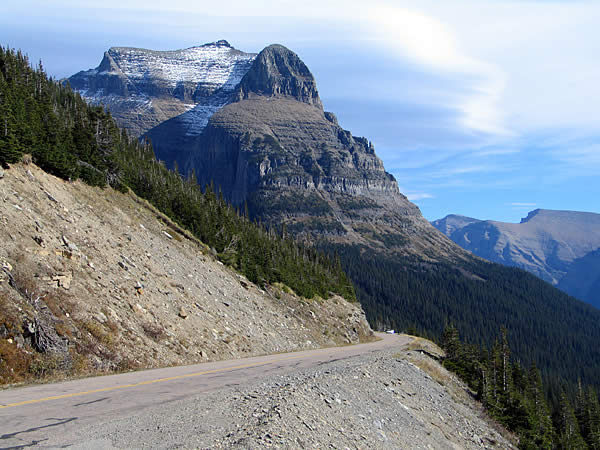
Going-to-the-Sun Mountain

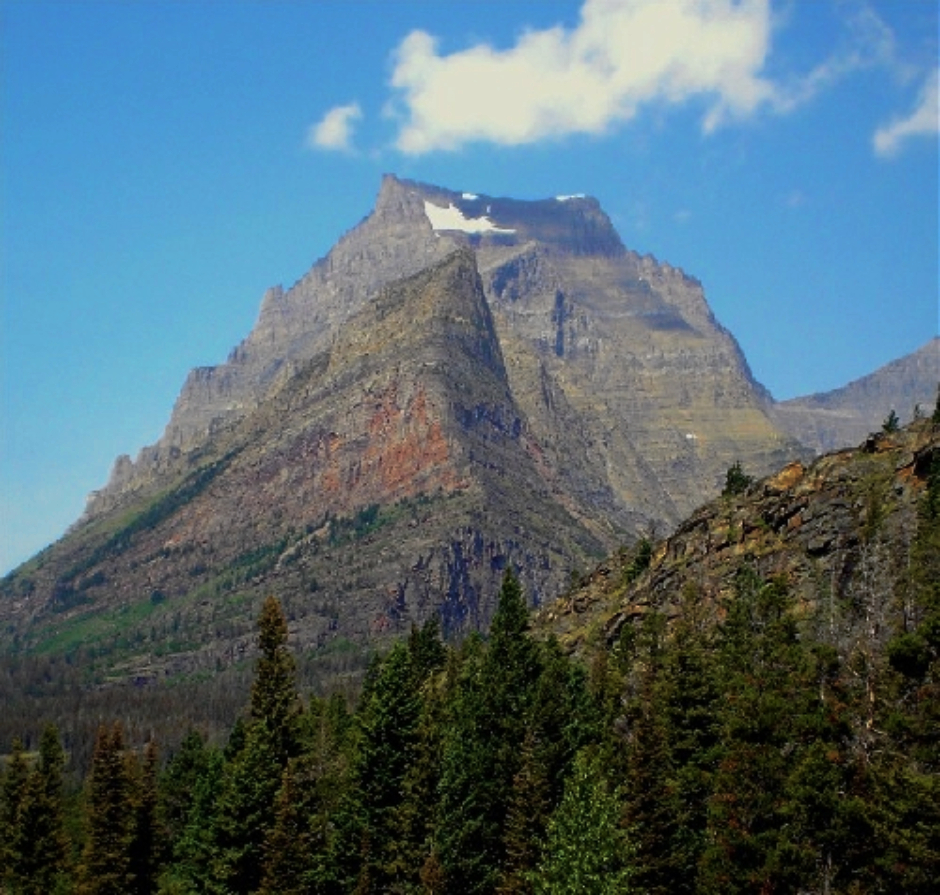
Going-To-The-Sun Mountain seen from east

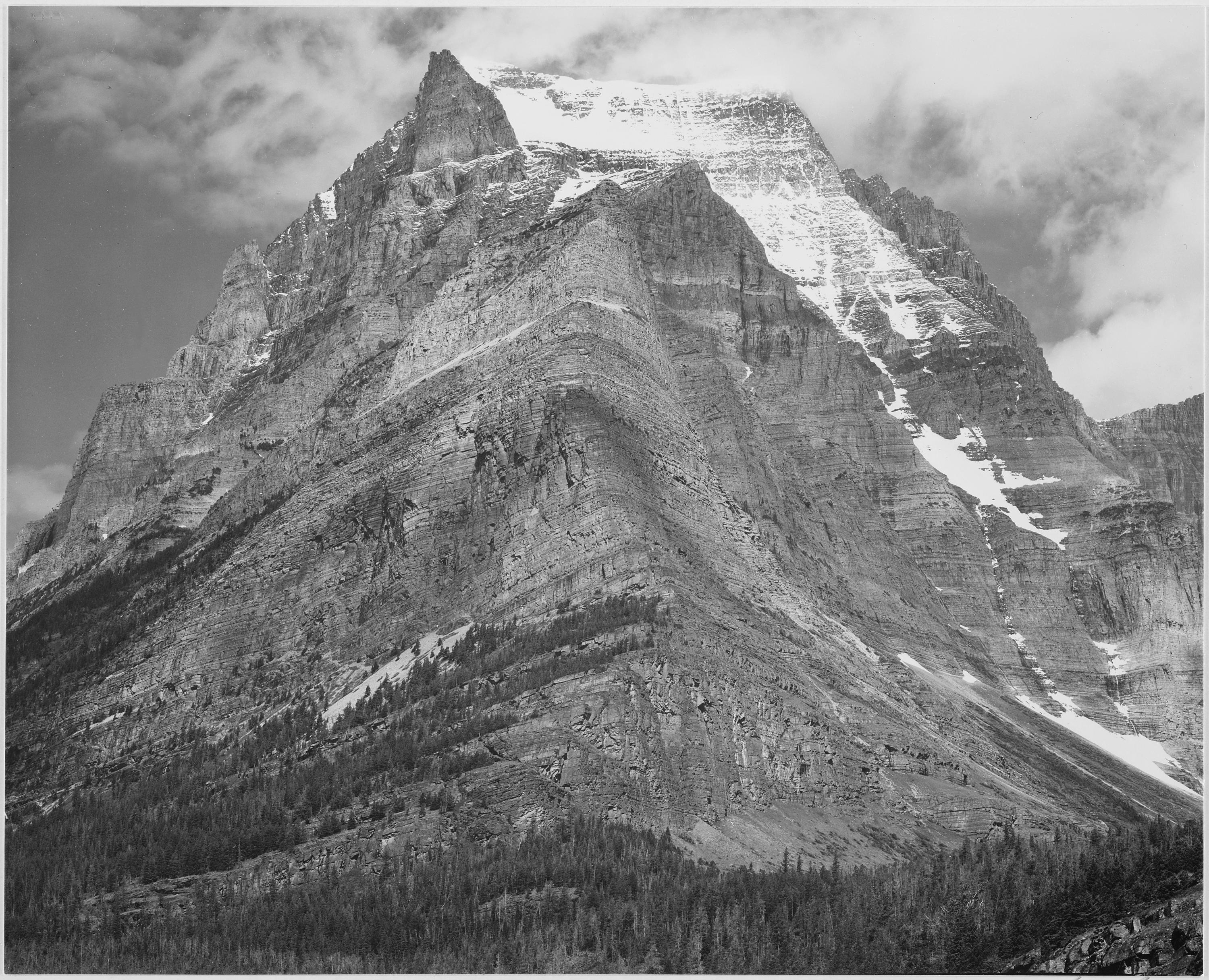
by Ansel Adams

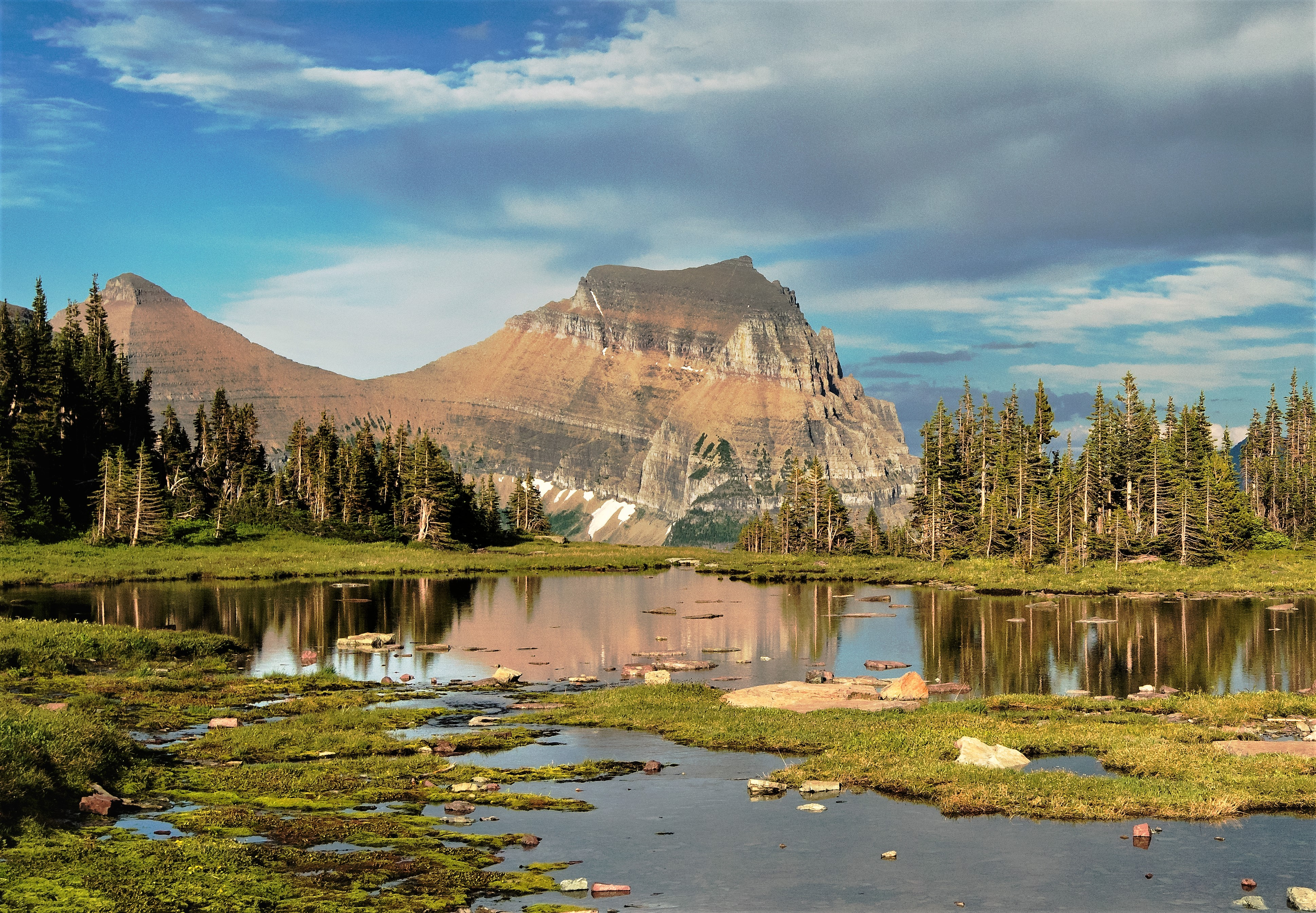

== See also ==
- List of mountains and mountain ranges of Glacier National Park (U.S.)
