= Roes Creek Campground Camptender's Cabin =

Cabin in Glacier National Park, an example of the National Park Service Rustic style

- U.S. National Register of Historic Places
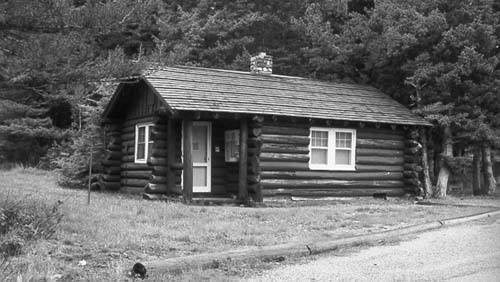

- Location within Montana Location within the United States
- Location: N of Going-to-the-Sun Rd. at St. Mary Lake, Glacier NP, St. Mary, Montana
- Coordinates: 48°41′39″N 113°31′13″W
- Architect: National Park Service, Branch of Plan
- MPS: Glacier National Park MPS
- NRHP reference No.: 95001575
- Added to NRHP: April 4, 1996

The Roes Creek Campground Camptender's Cabin, also known as the Rising Sun Campground Ranger Cabin, in Glacier National Park is an example of the National Park Service Rustic style.

Built in 1937 and designed by the National Park Service (NPS) Branch of Plans and Design, this small cabin is significant for its association with an important trend in park visitation patterns: the increase of middle-class automobile tourists and federal (versus concessionaire) development of infrastructure appropriate to this new clientele. In addition to basic services, an increased NPS presence was also warranted: campgrounds were assigned seasonal "camptenders" who performed custodial duties and provided assistance to visitors.

== See also ==
- Rising Sun Auto Camp
