= Swiftcurrent Auto Camp Historic District =

United States historic place in Glacier National Park

- U.S. National Register of Historic Places
- U.S. Historic district
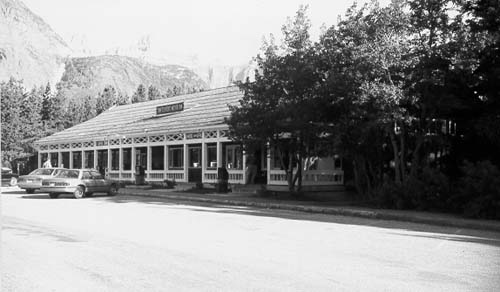
- Swiftcurrent General Store

- Location within Montana Location within the United States
- Location: W end of Glacier Rt. 3, Glacier NP, Many Glacier, Montana
- Coordinates: 48°47′54″N 113°40′33″W
- Architect: Glacier Park Hotel Co.; National Park Service, Branch of Plan
- MPS: Glacier National Park MPS
- NRHP reference No.: 95001578
- Added to NRHP: January 19, 1996

The Swiftcurrent Auto Camp Historic District preserves a portion of the built-up area of Glacier National Park that documents the second phase of tourist development in the park. After the creation of a series of hotels for train-borne visitors including the nearby Many Glacier Hotel, courtesy of the Great Northern Railway's hotel concession, facilities were developed for the increasing numbers of automobile-borne tourists, drawn to Glacier by the Going-to-the-Sun Road. The Swiftcurrent Auto Camp at Swiftcurrent Lake was created for these new tourists. It includes a rustic general store, built in 1935 by the Glacier Park Hotel Company, surrounded by a number of log tourist cabins., as well as a shower and laundry house and other supporting structures.

In contrast to the prominent site of the nearby Many Glacier Hotel, the auto camp is located in stands of mature trees that block direct views of the surrounding mountains. The facilities were intended to provide an inexpensive, informal alternative to the hotels that had heretofore provided the bulk of tourist accommodations. The camp was built by the railroad's Glacier Park Hotel Company subsidiary, under pressure from the National Park Service to provide such accommodations.

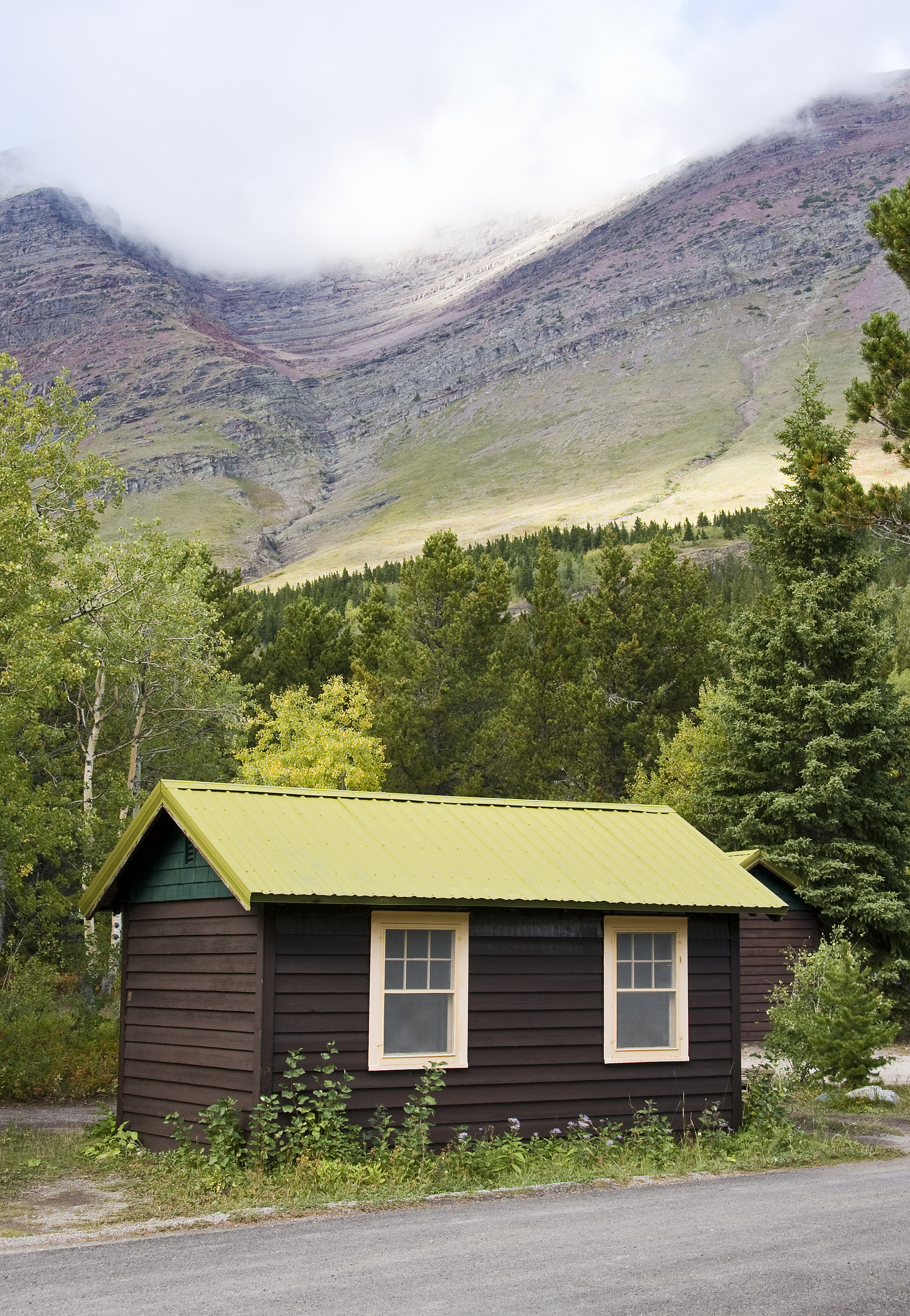
Swiftcurrent tourist cabin

== See also ==
- Rising Sun Auto Camp
- Swiftcurrent Ranger Station Historic District
