= Glacier Park Women's Club =

Historic women's club in Montana

- U.S. National Register of Historic Places
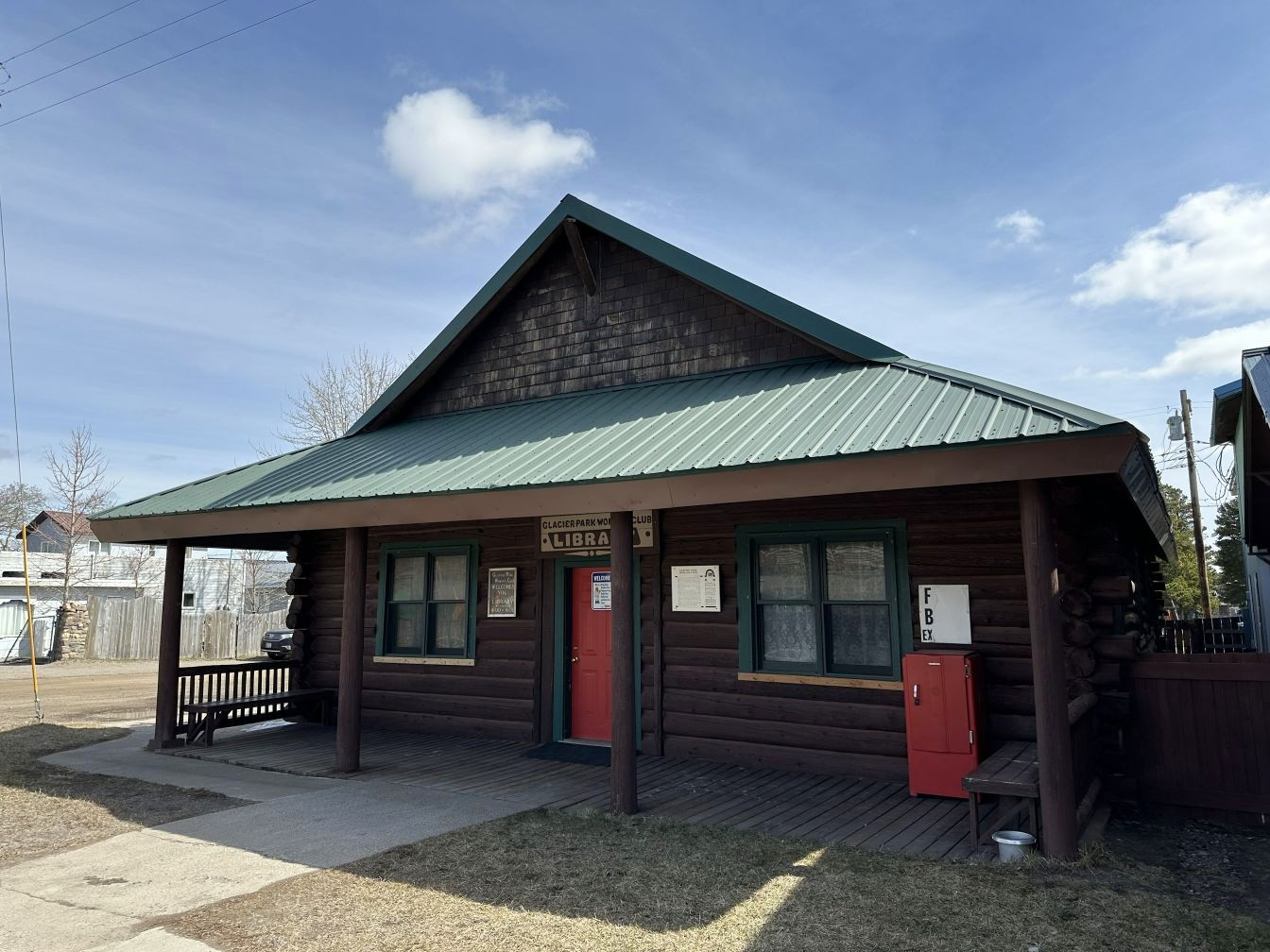

- Location within Montana Location within the United States
- Location: 1 Glacier Avenue, P.O. Box 306, East Glacier Park Village, Montana 59434
- Coordinates: 48°26′34″N 113°13′05″W
- Built: 1934
- Built by: Civilian Conservation Corps, Indian Division (CCC-ID), Missoula 9th Corps
- Architectural style: Rustic
- Website: Facebook page
- NRHP reference No.: 100004092
- Added to NRHP: June 13, 2019

The Glacier Park Women's Club is a women's club in East Glacier Park Village, Montana. Their clubhouse building, which is also known as the East Glacier Library and East Glacier Community Hall, is listed on the National Register of Historic Places.

== History ==
In 1920, a group of 23 women founded the organization to promote community service. Unlike most women's club of the time, it included a diverse mixture of members including Helene Dawson Edkins, a Blackfoot woman. Edkins later served as club president and as their representative to the General Federation of Women's Clubs of Montana.

In 1928, the group received the plot of land for the building from the Great Northern Railway. In 1934, Civilian Conservation Corps (CCC), Indian Division constructed the clubhouse, providing jobs to local members of the Blackfeet Nation. Because the CCC only built government buildings, the club was ineligible for that Depression era program. As a workaround, the group donated the land to Glacier County, who commissioned the building, and then deeded it back to the women after completion.

Since then, the club continues to serve as a club, library, meeting space and social center. It raises money through a combination of donations, a county stipend for housing the library, and hall rentals for events. With those funds, the group renovated the building in 2016 to replace rotting wood. The club coordinates a long-running Christmas bazaar and hosts a variety of community events.

== Architecture ==
The CCC constructed the one-story building with Rustic architecture, albeit on a smaller scale than their projects at nearby Glacier National Park. The exterior has bulky log walls with saddle-notched post-and-beam construction. The modern green metal roof has low overhanging eves with wood shingles on the gable ends. The front of the building has a hipped open porch with a sign reading "Glacier Park Women's Club Library" over the entrance.

== See also ==
- List of women's clubs
- National Register of Historic Places listings in Glacier County, Montana
