= East Glacier Ranger Station Historic District =

Ranger station

- U.S. National Register of Historic Places
- U.S. Historic district
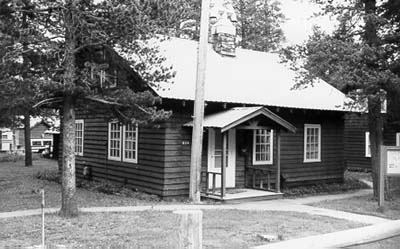

- Location within Montana Location within the United States
- Nearest city: West Glacier, Montana
- Coordinates: 48°26′51″N 113°13′25″W
- Built: 1927
- Architect: Park Service Engineering Dept.
- MPS: Glacier National Park MRA
- NRHP reference No.: 86003696
- Added to NRHP: December 16, 1986

The East Glacier Ranger Station, east of Glacier National Park, is characteristic of park buildings constructed in the 1920s and 1930s. It was designed by Daniel Ray Hull of the National Park Service Office of Plans, as a frame building compatible in style with the prevailing National Park Service Rustic style. It is the center of a group of related buildings, including several residential structures.

East Glacier, Montana was an arrival point for tourists arriving by rail in the park. Until the 1920 completion of US 2 and the Going-to-the-Sun Road, the east side of the park was isolated from the headquarters at West Glacier. The new ranger station complex at East Glacier was proposed to provide administrative services to the east side. In 1937, with the completion of the Going-to-the-Sun Road the more convenient Saint Mary Ranger Station took over maintenance duties, and four buildings at East Glacier were demolished by Civilian Conservation Corps workers.
