= Sun Camp Fireguard Cabin =

United States historic place in Glacier National Park, Montana, US

- U.S. National Register of Historic Places
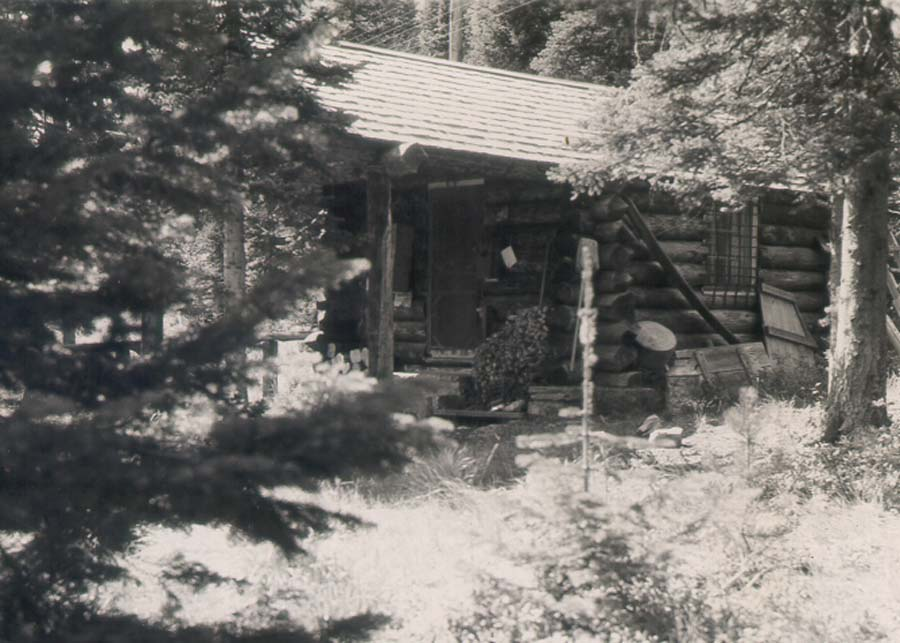

- Location within Montana Location within the United States
- Nearest city: St. Mary, Montana
- Coordinates: 48°41′11″N 113°35′13″W
- Built: 1935
- Architect: National Park Service
- MPS: Glacier National Park MPS
- NRHP reference No.: 99000776
- Added to NRHP: July 1, 1999

The Sun Camp Fireguard Cabin, also known as the Baring Creek Cabin or Baring Cabin, in Glacier National Park was an example of the National Park Service Rustic style. Built in 1935 by local contractor Harry E. Doverspike, the cabin was the last remaining building of the Sun Camp Ranger Station complex of buildings, which at one time included a ranger station, barn and woodshed located near the mouth of Baring Creek. The fireguard cabin was built according to cabin specifications provided by the NPS Division of Landscape Architecture. The only apparent dissimilarity is the center-wall placement of the entry. There was no indoor plumbing and heat was provided by a wood stove whose stovepipe exited through the back log wall to a stone chimney.

On July 22, 2015, the cabin was destroyed by the Reynolds Creek Wildfire.
