= East Glacier Park Village, Montana =

East Glacier Park, Montana
- CDP
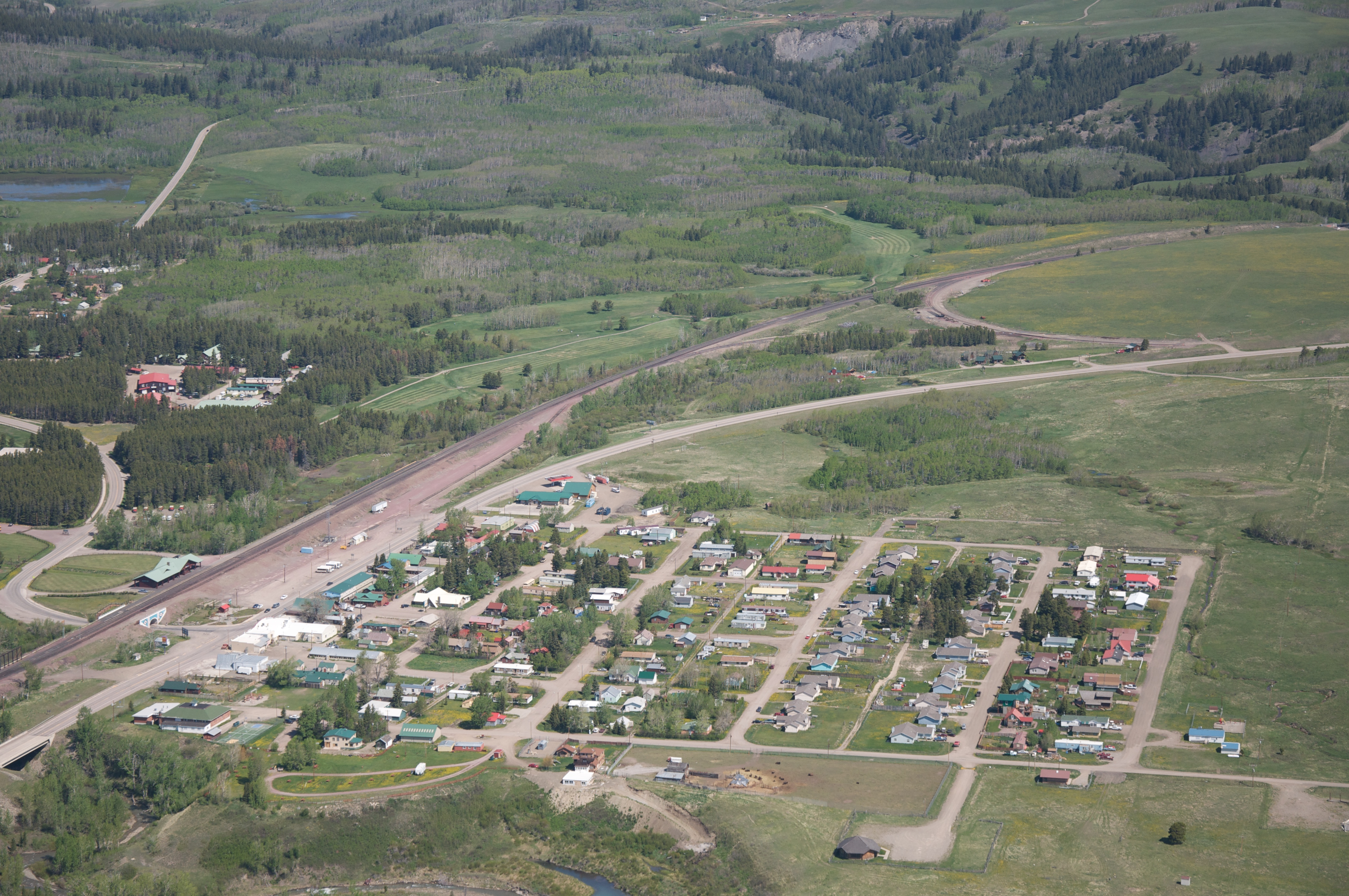

- Location of East Glacier Park, Montana
- Coordinates: 48°26′39″N 113°14′20″W
- Country: United States
- State: Montana
- County: Glacier

Area
  - Total: 4.36 sq mi (11.29 km^{2})
  - Land: 4.36 sq mi (11.29 km^{2})
  - Water: 0 sq mi (0.00 km^{2})
- Elevation: 4,823 ft (1,470 m)

Population (2020)
  - Total: 354
  - Density: 81.2/sq mi (31.36/km^{2})
- Time zone: UTC−7 (Mountain (MST))
  - Summer (DST): UTC−6 (MDT)
- Area code: 406
- FIPS code: 30-22985
- GNIS feature ID: 2408707

East Glacier Park is an unincorporated community and census-designated place (CDP) in Glacier County, Montana, United States. As of the 2020 census, it had a population of 354.

== History ==
The Great Northern Railway platted the community of Midvale in the 1890s. The town name was eventually changed to Glacier Park and officially became East Glacier Park in 1949. There are two National Register of Historic Places listings: the Ranger Station Historic District and the Women's Club.

=== 2022 attack ===
On July 19, 2022, 37-year-old Derick Amos Madden rammed his pickup truck (a Toyota Tacoma) into a Syracuse, New York, family in East Glacier Park Village. After crashing, he emerged with a 12-gauge shotgun and fatally shot the father and his 18-month-old daughter. He also critically injured the mother and the sister-in-law, the latter of whom had been in a relationship with Madden. Madden, who also used a knife in the attack, was subsequently killed by the sister-in-law when she fought back, wrestled away his own knife, and fatally stabbed him. Two other children in the family survived uninjured.

== Geography ==
According to the United States Census Bureau, the CDP has a total area of 4.4 square miles (11 km^{2}), all land. A significant number of lakes are located in the area.

=== Climate ===
East Glacier's climate is borderline Subarctic / Humid Continental, with warm summers, and winters generally beginning in November and lasting into March.

Climate data for East Glacier, Montana, 1991–2020 normals, extremes 1971–present: 4806ft (1465m)
Month	Jan	Feb	Mar	Apr	May	Jun	Jul	Aug	Sep	Oct	Nov	Dec	Year
Record high °F (°C)	57 (14)	63 (17)	67 (19)	80 (27)	86 (30)	89 (32)	97 (36)	97 (36)	92 (33)	86 (30)	67 (19)	55 (13)	97 (36)
Mean maximum °F (°C)	48.4 (9.1)	48.2 (9.0)	54.6 (12.6)	65.2 (18.4)	74.5 (23.6)	80.9 (27.2)	87.3 (30.7)	87.4 (30.8)	82.6 (28.1)	70.2 (21.2)	55.9 (13.3)	47.5 (8.6)	89.6 (32.0)
Mean daily maximum °F (°C)	30.4 (−0.9)	30.5 (−0.8)	37.1 (2.8)	45.6 (7.6)	55.6 (13.1)	64.1 (17.8)	73.8 (23.2)	74.0 (23.3)	63.3 (17.4)	49.9 (9.9)	36.3 (2.4)	29.3 (−1.5)	49.2 (9.5)
Daily mean °F (°C)	21.7 (−5.7)	21.8 (−5.7)	28.0 (−2.2)	36.1 (2.3)	44.9 (7.2)	52.7 (11.5)	59.9 (15.5)	59.2 (15.1)	50.5 (10.3)	39.6 (4.2)	29.0 (−1.7)	21.9 (−5.6)	38.8 (3.8)
Mean daily minimum °F (°C)	13.1 (−10.5)	13.0 (−10.6)	18.9 (−7.3)	26.5 (−3.1)	34.3 (1.3)	41.3 (5.2)	46.0 (7.8)	44.4 (6.9)	37.7 (3.2)	29.4 (−1.4)	21.8 (−5.7)	14.6 (−9.7)	28.4 (−2.0)
Mean minimum °F (°C)	−17.1 (−27.3)	−12.6 (−24.8)	−8.7 (−22.6)	8.0 (−13.3)	22.4 (−5.3)	31.5 (−0.3)	36.2 (2.3)	33.6 (0.9)	26.1 (−3.3)	9.4 (−12.6)	−3.1 (−19.5)	−14.3 (−25.7)	−28.4 (−33.6)
Record low °F (°C)	−43 (−42)	−44 (−42)	−35 (−37)	−13 (−25)	16 (−9)	15 (−9)	30 (−1)	18 (−8)	8 (−13)	−14 (−26)	−26 (−32)	−42 (−41)	−44 (−42)
Average precipitation inches (mm)	3.09 (78)	2.56 (65)	2.55 (65)	2.21 (56)	2.89 (73)	4.00 (102)	1.54 (39)	1.46 (37)	2.17 (55)	2.55 (65)	2.78 (71)	2.63 (67)	30.43 (773)
Average snowfall inches (cm)	29.0 (74)	21.0 (53)	22.9 (58)	18.4 (47)	4.0 (10)	1.5 (3.8)	0.0 (0.0)	0.4 (1.0)	0.8 (2.0)	9.3 (24)	20.1 (51)	29.6 (75)	157.0 (399)
Average precipitation days (≥ 0.01 in)	14.7	11.5	12.7	9.4	8.5	10.2	7.7	6.9	7.7	8.1	12.8	14.4	124.6
Average snowy days (≥ 0.1 in)	9.9	7.7	8.3	5.5	1.1	0.2	0.0	0.1	0.2	2.6	7.3	10.8	53.7
Source 1: NOAA
Source 2: XMACIS2

== Demographics ==
Historical population
Census	Pop.	Note	%±
2020	354		—
U.S. Decennial Census

As of the census of 2000, there were 396 people, 148 households, and 101 families residing in the CDP. The population density was 90.9 inhabitants per square mile (35.1/km^{2}). There were 219 housing units at an average density of 50.3 per square mile (19.4/km^{2}). The racial makeup of the CDP was 43.43% White, 0.25% African American, 51.77% Native American, 1.26% from other races, and 3.28% from two or more races. Hispanic or Latino of any race were 0.76% of the population.

There were 148 households, out of which 35.1% had children under the age of 18 living with them, 50.7% were married couples living together, 14.2% had a female householder with no husband present, and 31.1% were non-families. 23.0% of all households were made up of individuals, and 4.1% had someone living alone who was 65 years of age or older. The average household size was 2.68 and the average family size was 3.27.

In the CDP, the population was spread out, with 32.1% under the age of 18, 5.6% from 18 to 24, 28.8% from 25 to 44, 26.5% from 45 to 64, and 7.1% who were 65 years of age or older. The median age was 36 years. For every 100 females, there were 93.2 males. For every 100 females age 18 and over, there were 92.1 males.

The median income for a household in the CDP was $37,417, and the median income for a family was $39,250. Males had a median income of $32,250 versus $27,917 for females. The per capita income for the CDP was $17,318. About 14.3% of families and 14.1% of the population were below the poverty line, including 17.3% of those under age 18 and 26.8% of those age 65 or over.

== Infrastructure ==
=== Transportation ===
The East Glacier Park Amtrak Station is open seasonally during the spring, summer and fall, served by the Empire Builder between Chicago and Seattle/Portland. During the winter the stop is at Browning, Montana, just east of East Glacier Village. Glacier Park International Airport at Kalispell is the closest airport.

=== Emergency services ===
The East Glacier Volunteer Fire Department was founded in 1968. Today, it consists of around 18 volunteers who help protect the village and surrounding area from the threat of wildland fire.

== Education ==
It is in the East Glacier Park Elementary School District and the Browning High School District.

== Gallery ==
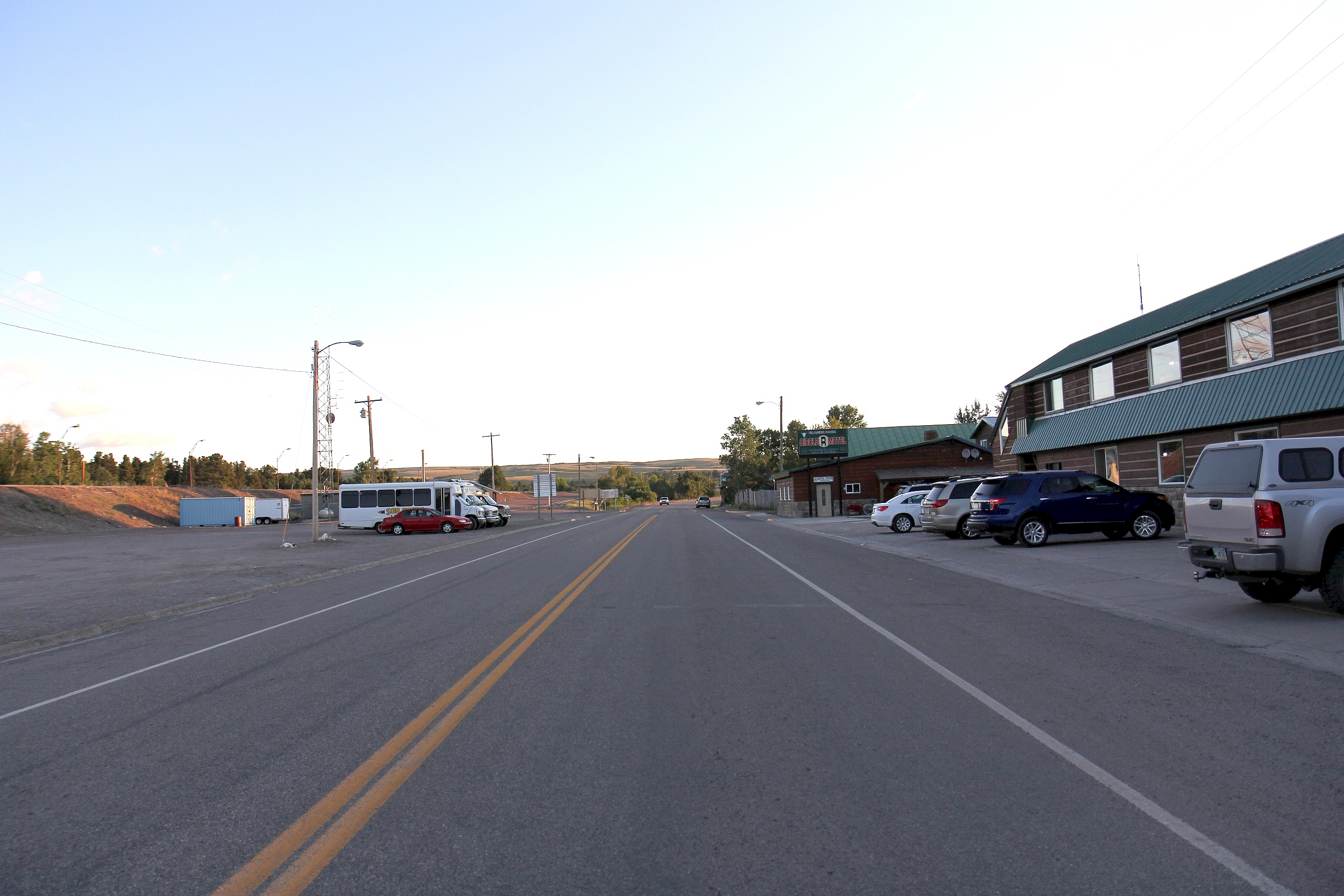
Looking north in East Glacier Park

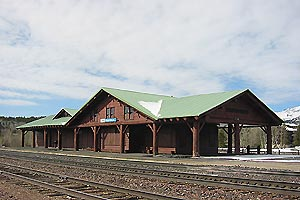
East Glacier Park Amtrak station

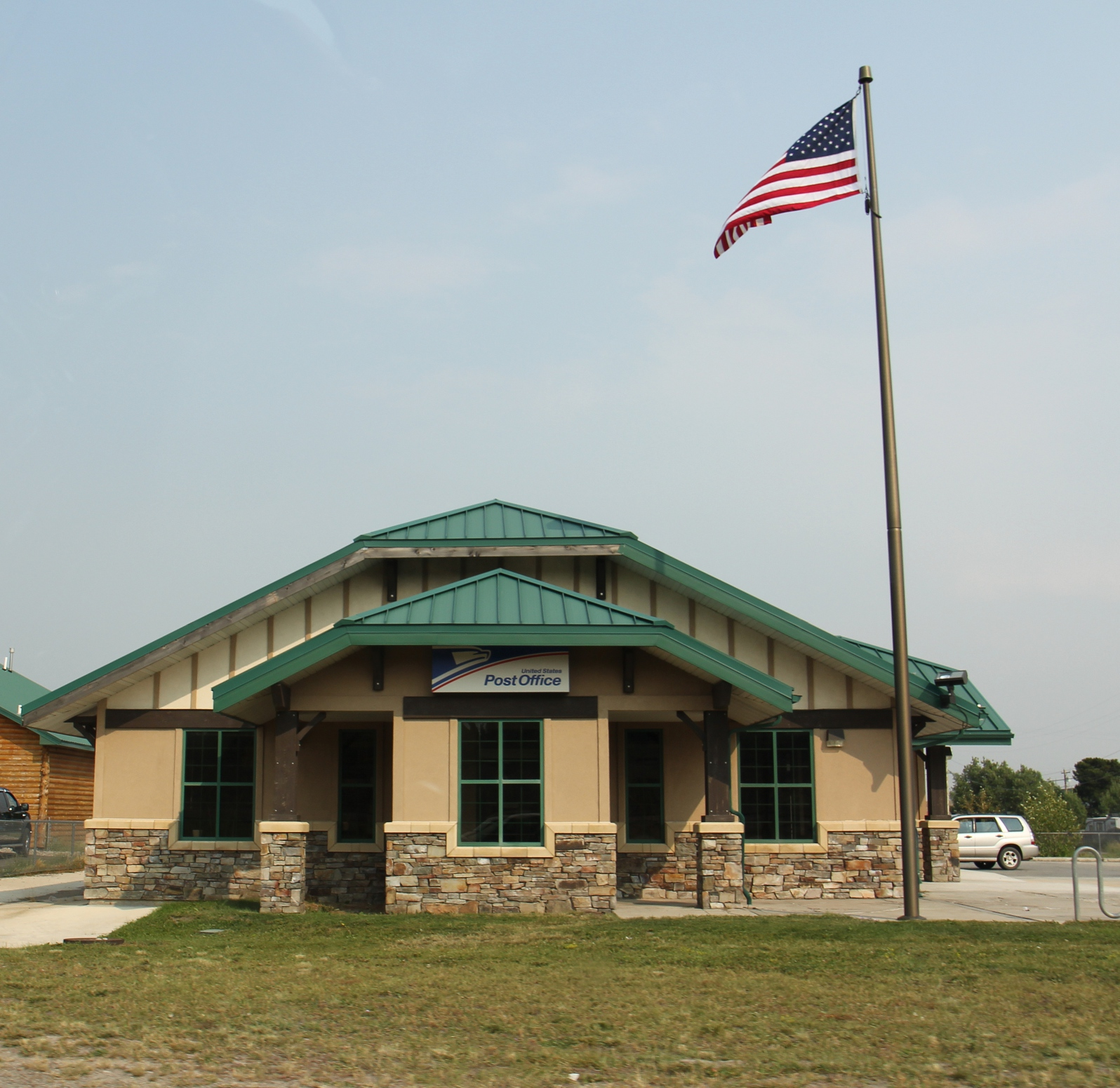
Post office

== See also ==
- West Glacier, Montana
