= St. Mary, Montana =

- Census-Designated Place
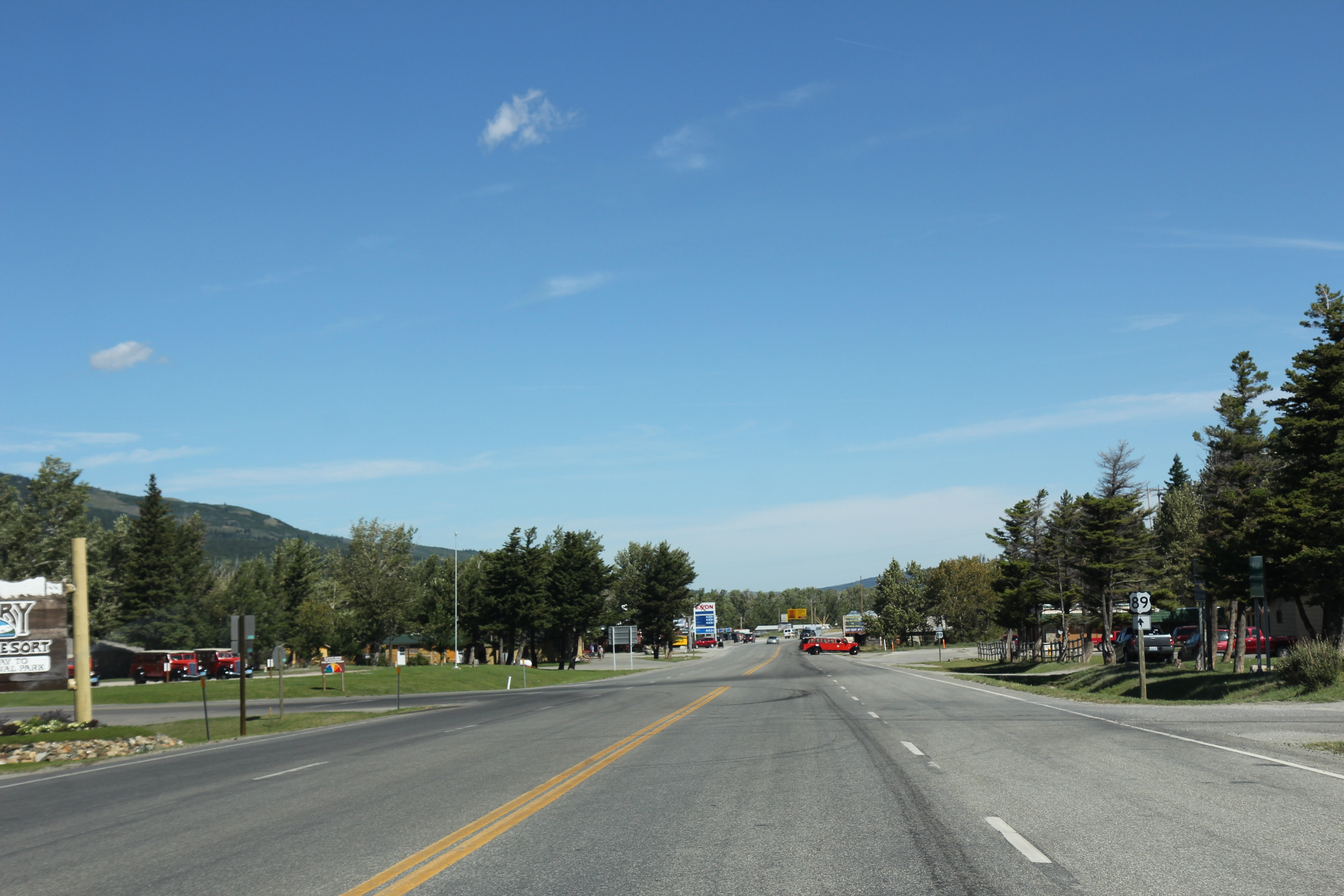
- Downtown St. Mary looking north on U.S. Route 89
- Interactive map of St. Mary, Montana
- Coordinates: 48°44′34″N 113°25′39″W
- Country: United States
- State: Montana
- County: Glacier

Area
  - Total: 0.75 sq mi (1.95 km^{2})
  - Land: 0.75 sq mi (1.95 km^{2})
  - Water: 0 sq mi (0.00 km^{2})
- Elevation: 4,633 ft (1,412 m)

Population (2020)
  - Total: 54
  - Density: 71.8/sq mi (27.71/km^{2})
- Time zone: UTC-8 (Pacific (PST))
  - Summer (DST): UTC-7 (PDT)
- FIPS code: 30-65425
- GNIS feature ID: 2806626

St. Mary or Saint Mary (Blackfeet: Natoaki, "Holy Woman") is an unincorporated community on the western border of the Blackfeet Indian Reservation adjacent to Glacier National Park in Glacier County, Montana, United States. The village is the eastern terminus of the Going-to-the-Sun Road which bisects the park east to west, a distance of 53 mi (85 km).

As of the 2020 census, St. Mary had a population of 54. The population increases tenfold on a busy summer evening. Several lodges, restaurants and cafés, a small grocery store, two gas stations and campgrounds are located in the village. A large housing area for National Park Service personnel is located adjacent to the village, but within the park.

U.S. Route 89 passes through the village, which lies between Saint Mary Lake in Glacier National Park and Lower St. Mary Lake on the Blackfeet Indian Reservation.

== Climate ==
This climatic region is typified by large seasonal temperature differences, with warm to hot (and often humid) summers and cold (sometimes severely cold) winters. According to the Köppen Climate Classification system, St. Mary has a humid continental climate, abbreviated "Dfb" on climate maps.

Climate data for St Mary, Montana, 1991–2020 normals, 1981-2020 extremes: 4560ft (1340m)
Month	Jan	Feb	Mar	Apr	May	Jun	Jul	Aug	Sep	Oct	Nov	Dec	Year
Record high °F (°C)	60 (16)	63 (17)	72 (22)	82 (28)	93 (34)	95 (35)	102 (39)	99 (37)	97 (36)	87 (31)	72 (22)	58 (14)	102 (39)
Mean maximum °F (°C)	51.2 (10.7)	52.7 (11.5)	57.3 (14.1)	68.5 (20.3)	78.2 (25.7)	84.8 (29.3)	91.3 (32.9)	91.2 (32.9)	86.0 (30.0)	73.7 (23.2)	58.4 (14.7)	48.8 (9.3)	93.4 (34.1)
Mean daily maximum °F (°C)	29.2 (−1.6)	32.1 (0.1)	37.9 (3.3)	46.6 (8.1)	57.2 (14.0)	64.4 (18.0)	75.0 (23.9)	74.4 (23.6)	63.2 (17.3)	48.9 (9.4)	36.3 (2.4)	29.4 (−1.4)	49.5 (9.8)
Daily mean °F (°C)	20.8 (−6.2)	22.9 (−5.1)	28.7 (−1.8)	36.5 (2.5)	45.9 (7.7)	52.5 (11.4)	60.6 (15.9)	59.3 (15.2)	50.6 (10.3)	39.9 (4.4)	29.4 (−1.4)	22.4 (−5.3)	39.1 (4.0)
Mean daily minimum °F (°C)	12.3 (−10.9)	13.7 (−10.2)	19.6 (−6.9)	26.3 (−3.2)	34.6 (1.4)	40.7 (4.8)	46.1 (7.8)	44.2 (6.8)	37.9 (3.3)	30.8 (−0.7)	22.4 (−5.3)	15.3 (−9.3)	28.7 (−1.9)
Mean minimum °F (°C)	−16.9 (−27.2)	−10.1 (−23.4)	−4.3 (−20.2)	9.6 (−12.4)	22.3 (−5.4)	30.9 (−0.6)	36.9 (2.7)	33.4 (0.8)	25.6 (−3.6)	13.2 (−10.4)	−1.1 (−18.4)	−12.6 (−24.8)	−25.0 (−31.7)
Record low °F (°C)	−36 (−38)	−40 (−40)	−29 (−34)	−11 (−24)	15 (−9)	27 (−3)	29 (−2)	20 (−7)	12 (−11)	−8 (−22)	−24 (−31)	−38 (−39)	−40 (−40)
Average precipitation inches (mm)	2.20 (56)	1.95 (50)	1.69 (43)	1.93 (49)	2.88 (73)	3.37 (86)	1.53 (39)	1.63 (41)	2.18 (55)	2.05 (52)	2.47 (63)	2.21 (56)	26.09 (663)
Average snowfall inches (cm)	15.5 (39)	18.6 (47)	15.9 (40)	13.2 (34)	4.8 (12)	1.0 (2.5)	0.0 (0.0)	0.0 (0.0)	1.7 (4.3)	8.5 (22)	17.8 (45)	20.8 (53)	117.8 (298.8)
Average extreme snow depth inches (cm)	12.8 (33)	13.0 (33)	11.6 (29)	7.1 (18)	2.7 (6.9)	0.6 (1.5)	0.0 (0.0)	0.0 (0.0)	0.2 (0.51)	3.3 (8.4)	8.8 (22)	9.7 (25)	20.4 (52)
Source 1: NOAA (1981-2010 precip/snowfall)
Source 2: XMACIS2 (records, monthly max/mins & 1981-2010 snow depth)

== Demographics ==
Historical population
Census	Pop.	Note	%±
2020	54		—
U.S. Decennial Census

== Education ==
The area school district is Browning Public Schools, with its components being Browning Elementary School District and Browning High School District.

== Images ==
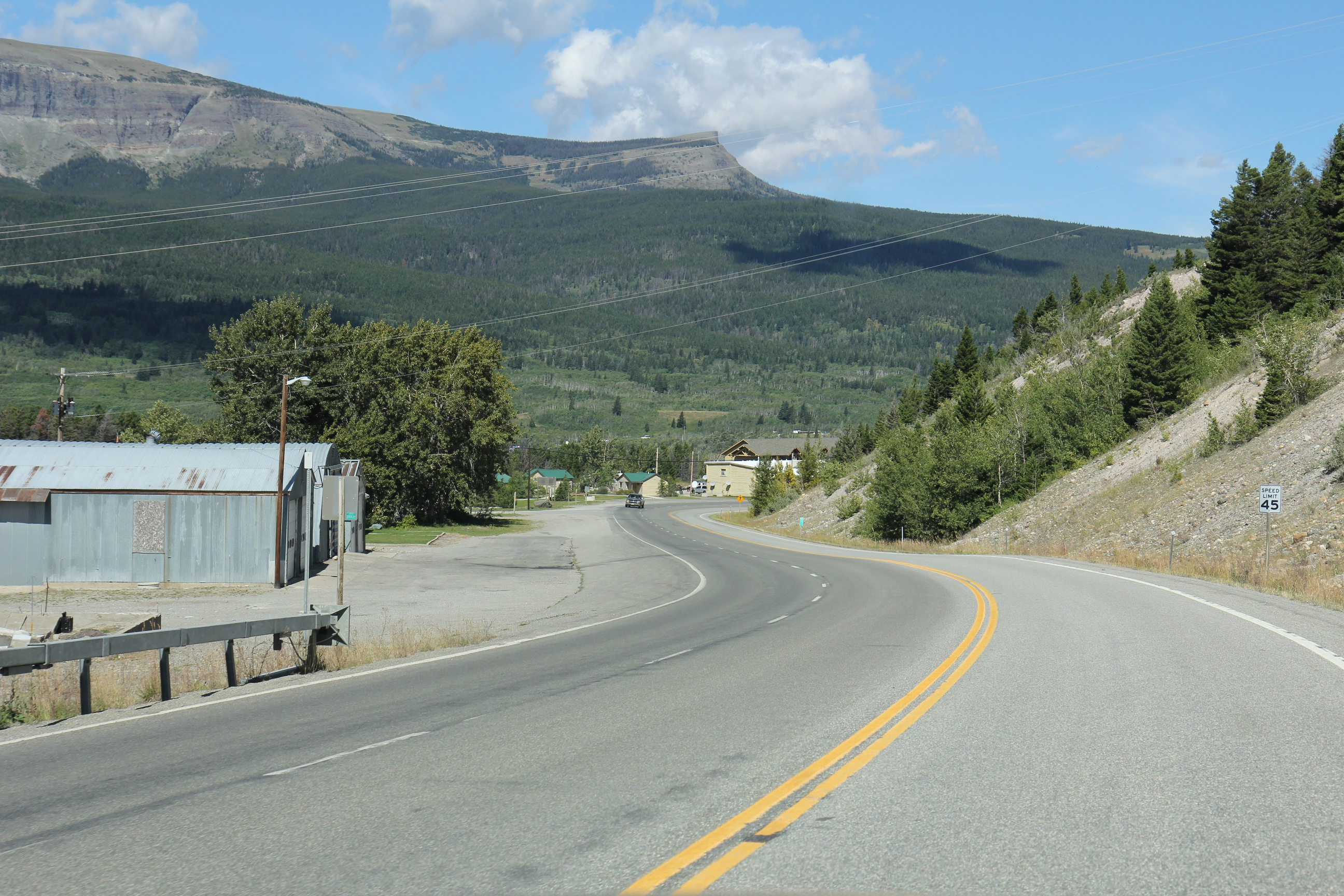
Panorama for St. Mary

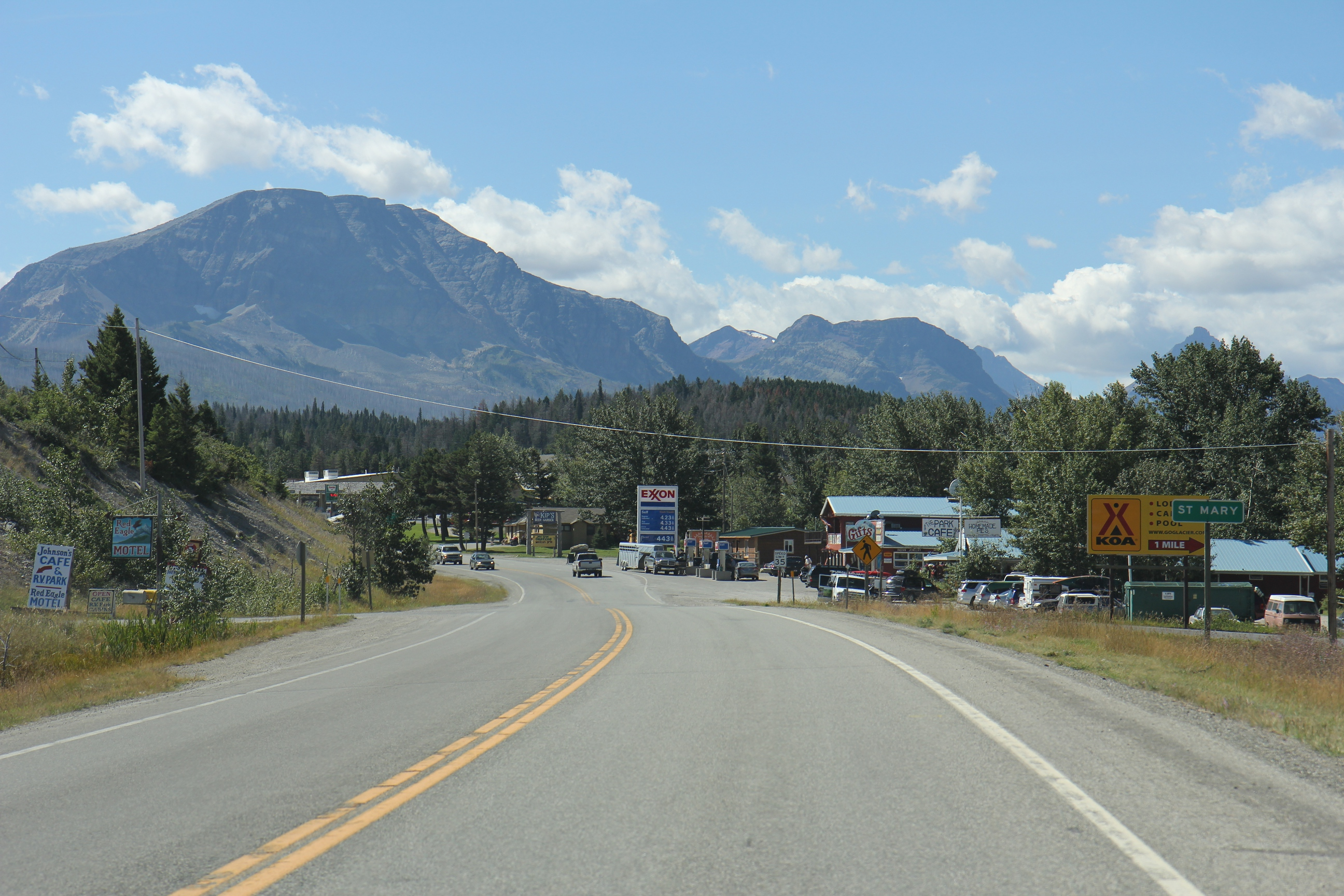
Looking south at St. Mary's sign

== See also ==
- Saint Mary Visitor Center, Entrance Station and Checking Stations
- Mount James
