= Going-to-the-Sun Road =

- U.S. National Register of Historic Places
- U.S. National Historic Landmark
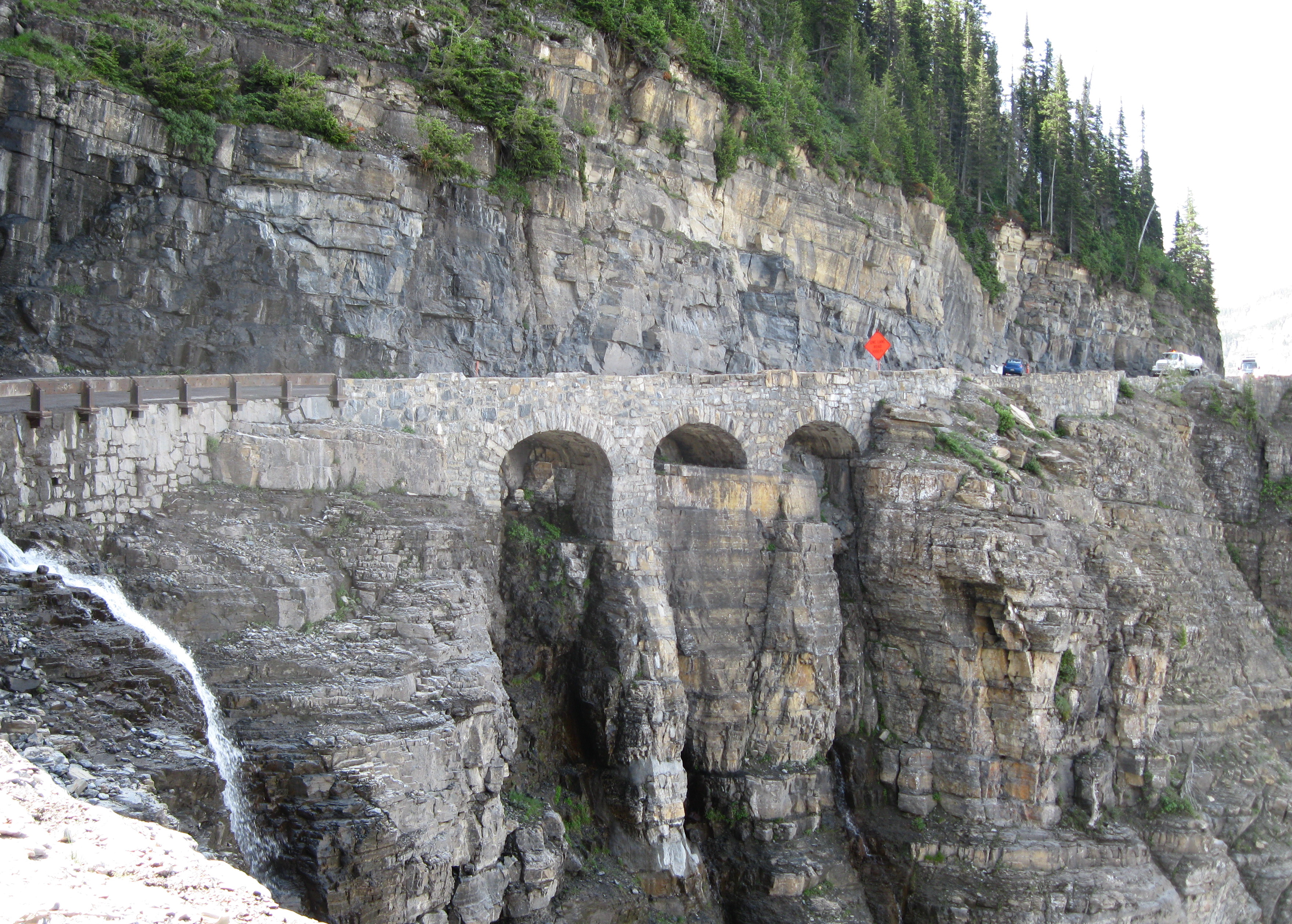
- The road is often cut into steep rock

- Location within Montana Location within the United States
- Location: Glacier National Park, Flathead and Glacier counties, Montana, U.S.
- Nearest city: West Glacier, Montana
- Coordinates: 48.695°N 113.817°W
- Built: 1921–1932; dedicated 1933
- Architect: National Park Service; Bureau of Public Roads
- NRHP reference No.: 83001070

Significant dates
- Added to NRHP: June 16, 1983
- Designated NHL: February 18, 1997

Going-to-the-Sun Road is a scenic mountain road in the Rocky Mountains of the western United States, in Glacier National Park in Montana. The Sun Road, as it is sometimes abbreviated in National Park Service documents, is the only road that traverses the park, crossing the Continental Divide through Logan Pass at an elevation of 6,646 feet (2,026 m), which is the highest point on the road. Construction began in 1921 and was completed in 1932 with formal dedication in the following summer on July 15, 1933. Prior to the construction of the road, visitors would need to spend several days traveling through the central part of the park, an area which can now be traversed within a few hours, excluding any stops for sightseeing or construction.

The road is the first to have been registered in all of the following categories: National Historic Place, National Historic Landmark and Historic Civil Engineering Landmark. The road is approximately 50 miles (80 km) long and spans the width of the park between the east and west entrance stations. The National Historic Landmark Nomination records a slightly shorter distance of 48.7 miles which is measured from the first main intersection just outside the park's west entrance to Divide Creek in St. Mary, Montana on the east side of the park.

== Name ==
The road is named after Going-to-the-Sun Mountain which dominates the eastbound view beyond Logan Pass. One Native American legend concerns the deity Sour Spirit who came down from the Sun to teach the Blackfeet the basics of hunting. While returning to the Sun, an image of Sour Spirit was placed on the mountain as an inspiration for the Blackfeet. Another story has suggested that a late-19th-century Euro-American explorer provided the mountain's name and the legend.

== Design ==
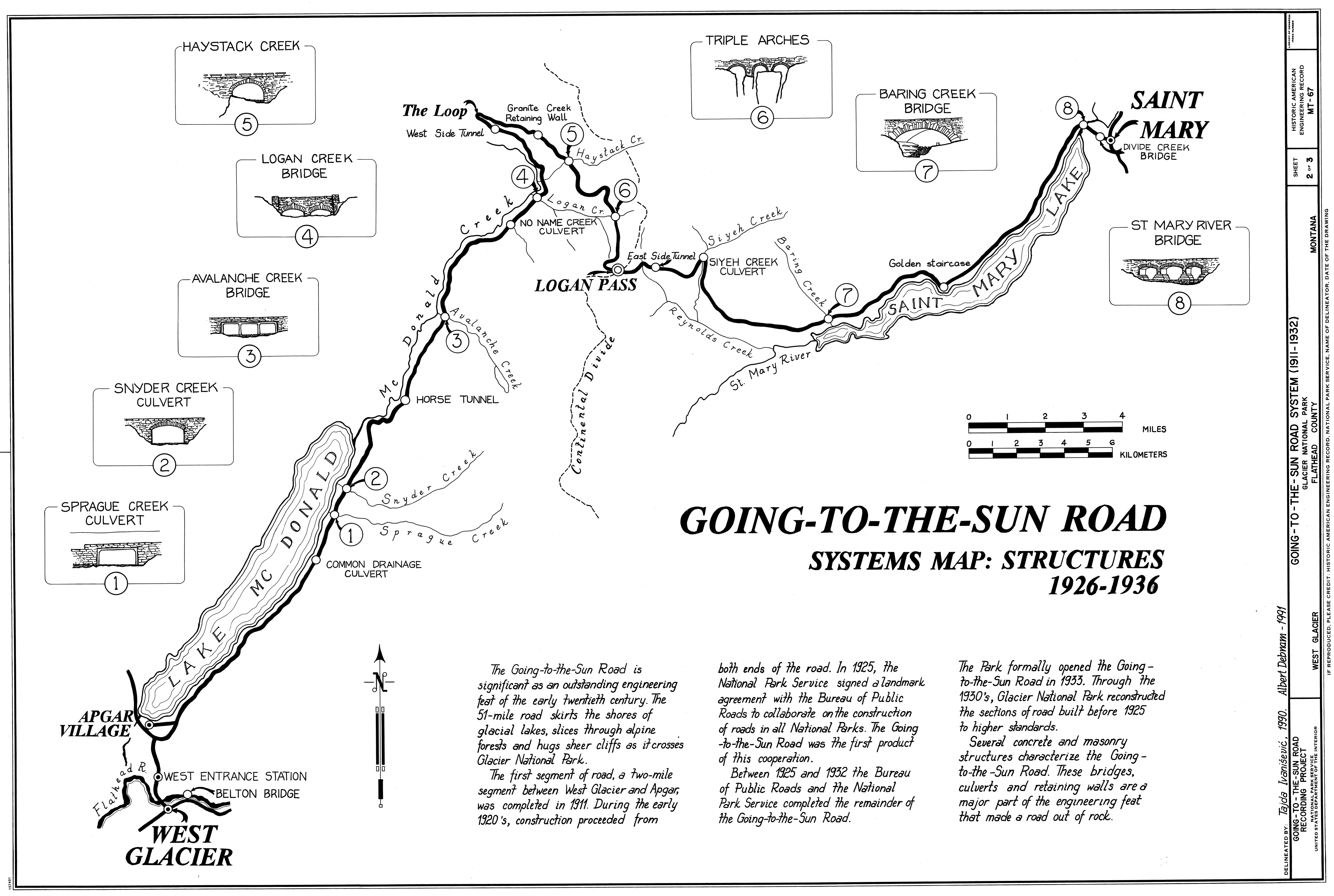
Road map (click map to enlarge)

Going-to-the-Sun Road, also known as Glacier Route 1 Road, is notable as one of the first National Park Service projects specifically intended to accommodate the automobile-borne tourist. The road was first conceived by superintendent George Goodwin in 1917, who became the chief engineer of the Park Service the following year. As chief engineer, the new road became Goodwin's primary project, and construction began in 1921.

As the project proceeded, Goodwin lost influence with National Park Service director Stephen Mather, who favored landscape architect Thomas Chalmers Vint's alternative routing of the upper portion of the road along the Garden Wall escarpment. Vint's alignment reduced both switchbacks and the road's visual impact, at increased cost. With Goodwin's resignation, Vint's proposal became the preferred alignment. The entire project was finally opened from end to end in 1933, at a cost of $2.5 million.

The western terminus of the road is at U.S. Route 2 in West Glacier, Montana. The eastern terminus is at U.S. Route 89 in St. Mary.

The two-lane Going-to-the-Sun Road is quite narrow and winding, with hairpin turns, especially west of Logan Pass. Consequently, vehicle lengths over the highest portions of the roadway are limited to no longer than 21 feet (6.4 m) and no wider than 8 feet (2.4 m) between Avalanche Creek and Rising Sun picnic areas which are located many miles below Logan Pass, on the west and east sides of the pass, respectively. Vehicles over 10 feet (3.0 m) in height may not have sufficient clearance due to rock overhangs when driving west between Logan Pass and the hairpin turn called the Loop. The speed limits are 45 mph (72 km/h) in the lower elevations and 25 mph (40 km/h) in the steeper and winding alpine sections.

== Repairs ==
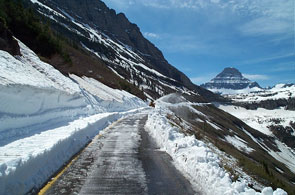
Plowing not yet finished as of June 21

The road is one of the most difficult roads in North America to snowplow in the spring. Up to 80 feet (24 m) of snow can lie on top of Logan Pass, and more just east of the pass where the deepest snowfield has long been called the Big Drift. The road takes about ten weeks to plow, even with equipment that can move 4,000 tons of snow in an hour. The snowplow crew can clear as little as 500 feet (150 m) of the road per day. On the east side of the Continental Divide, there are few guardrails due to heavy snows and the resultant late-winter avalanches that have destroyed protective barriers. The road is generally open from early June to mid October, with its latest opening on July 13, 2022, marking the record for the latest opening since the inaugural date of July 15, 1933.

A restoration project by the National Park Service and the Federal Highway Administration has been repairing road damage from many avalanches and rock slides over the years. The repairs, which started in the 1980s and continue to the present day when weather permits, include fixing retaining walls, replacing the original pavement with reinforced concrete, and work on tunnels, bridges, culverts and overlooks.

== Buses ==
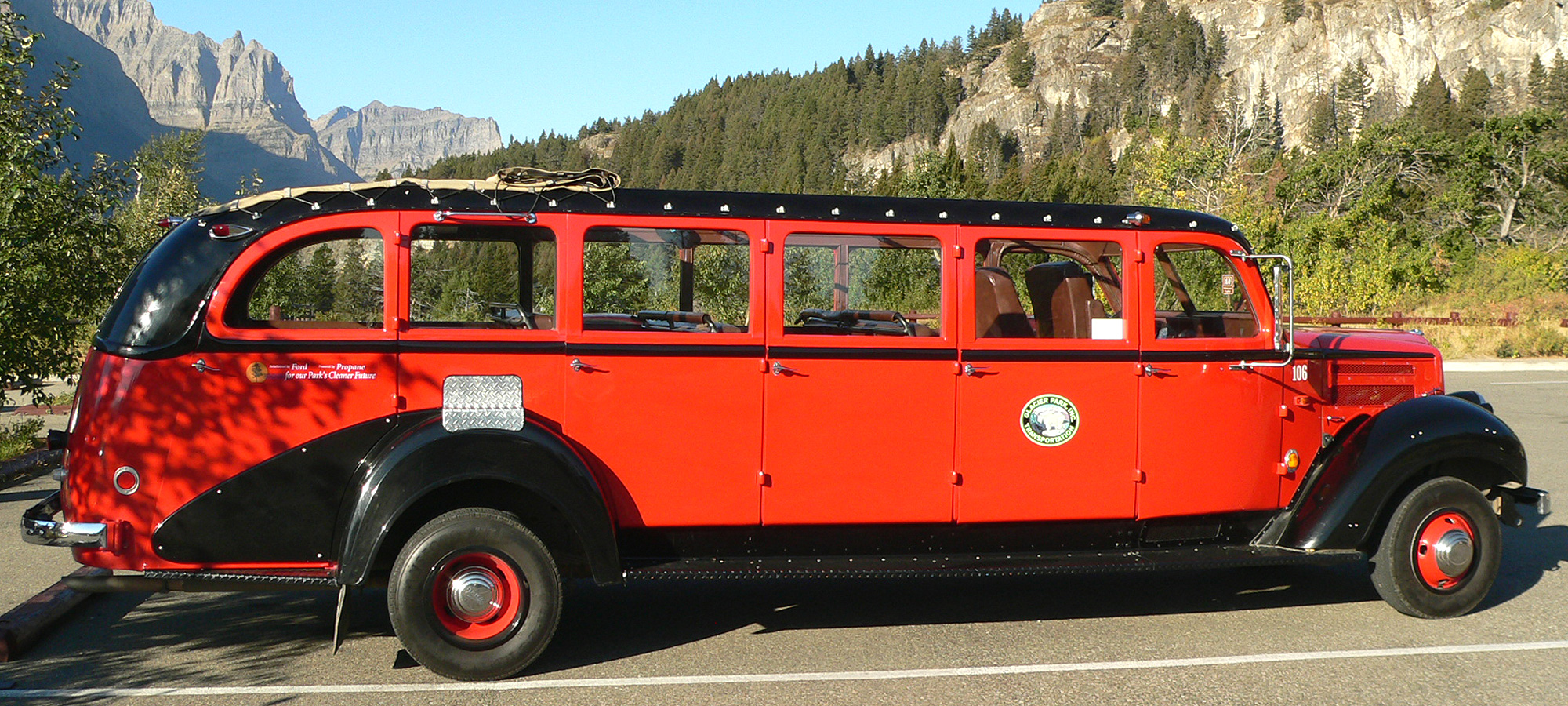
Red Jammer bus (2006)

A fleet of vintage 1930s red buses, modernized in 2001 and called Red Jammers, or simply "Reds", continue the tradition of offering guided tours along the road. The original bus drivers became affectionately known as "Gear Jammers", or simply "Jammers", since they had to jam the manual gearbox into low to safely negotiate the steepest road sections. Thirty-three of the original buses were rebuilt with flexible-fuel engines, which operate mainly on propane, but can use gasoline, and with automatic transmissions, making the Jammer name archaic. Modern-style shuttle buses for shorter trips and Blackfeet tour buses operate on the road as well.

== References in popular culture ==
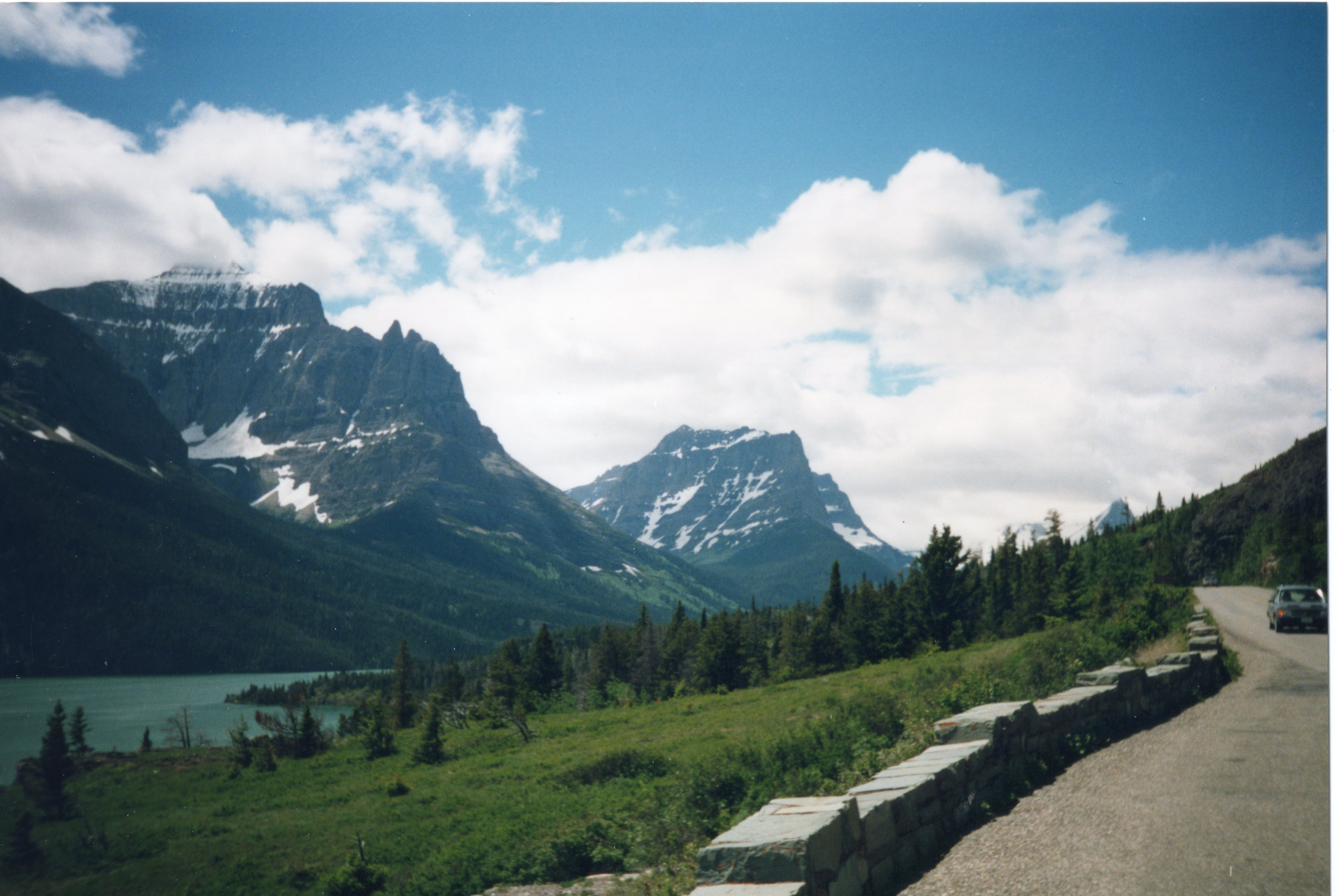
Saint Mary Lake from road

Going-to-the-Sun Road is shown in the opening credits of the 1980 film The Shining, as aerial flybys of Wild Goose Island and the protagonist's car traveling along the north shore of Saint Mary Lake, through the East Side tunnel and onward, going to a mountain resort hotel for his job interview as a winter caretaker. The road is also featured at night at the climax of the sequel adaptation, Doctor Sleep, when Danny Torrance returns to the Overlook Hotel with Abra to confront the antagonist Rose The Hat.

The road is also seen briefly in the 1994 film Forrest Gump. As Forrest reminisces with Jenny he remembers running across the U.S. and remarks, "Like that mountain lake. It was so clear, Jenny. It looked like there were two skies, one on top of the other." The shots in the background are Going-to-the-Sun Road and Saint Mary Lake.

The road is the subject of the song "Going-to-the-Sun Road" by Fleet Foxes, featured on their 2020 album Shore.

== See also ==
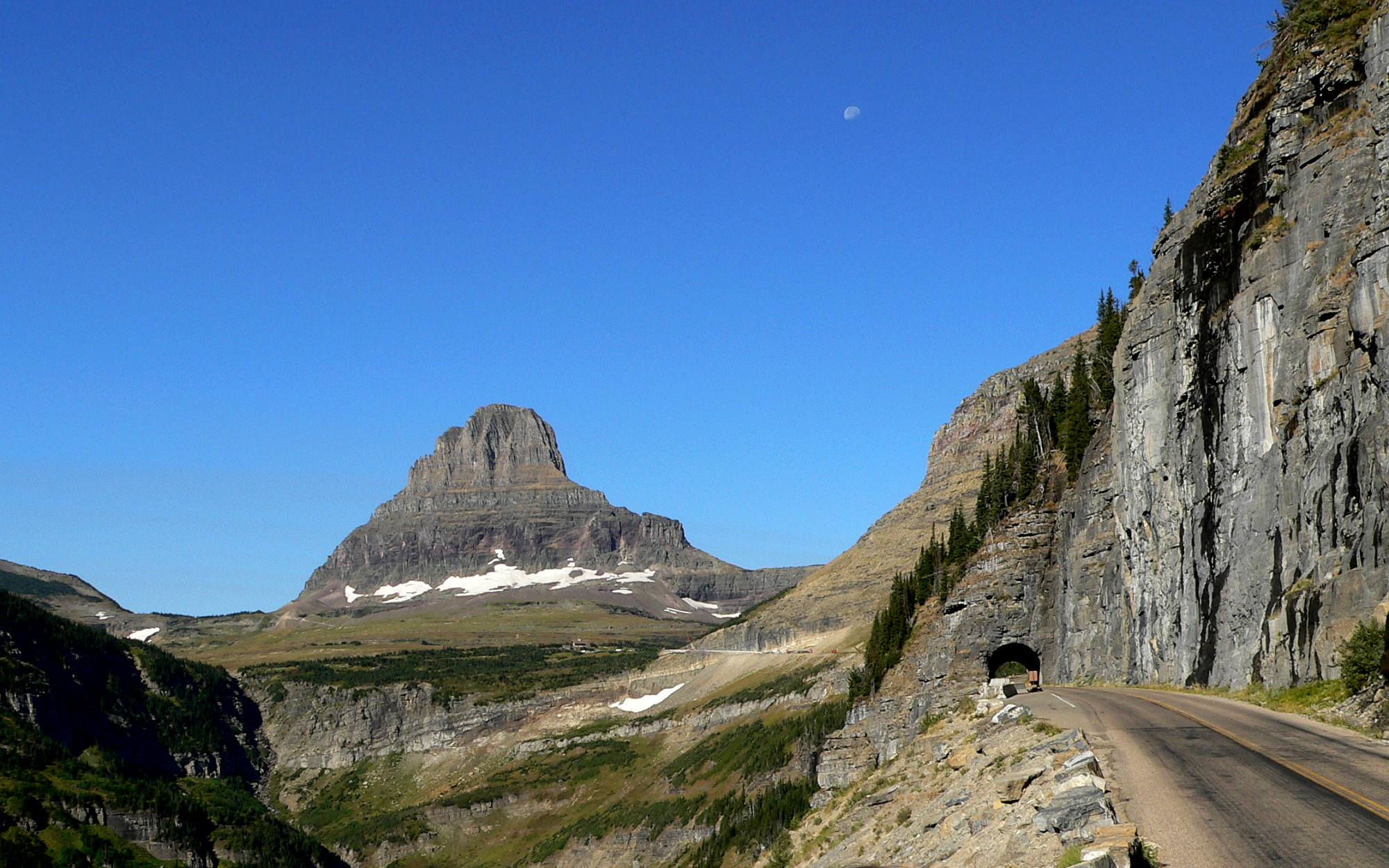
Clements Mountain and the East Side tunnel

Major points of interest along the road from west-to-east include:

- Lake McDonald
- Trail of the Cedars
- Heavens Peak
- Bird Woman Falls
- Garden Wall / Weeping Wall
- Logan Pass
- Clements Mountain
- Mount Jackson / Glacier
- Going-to-the-Sun Mountain
- Rising Sun Auto Camp
- Saint Mary Lake
