= Saint Mary Lake =

Lake in Glacier County, Montana, U.S.

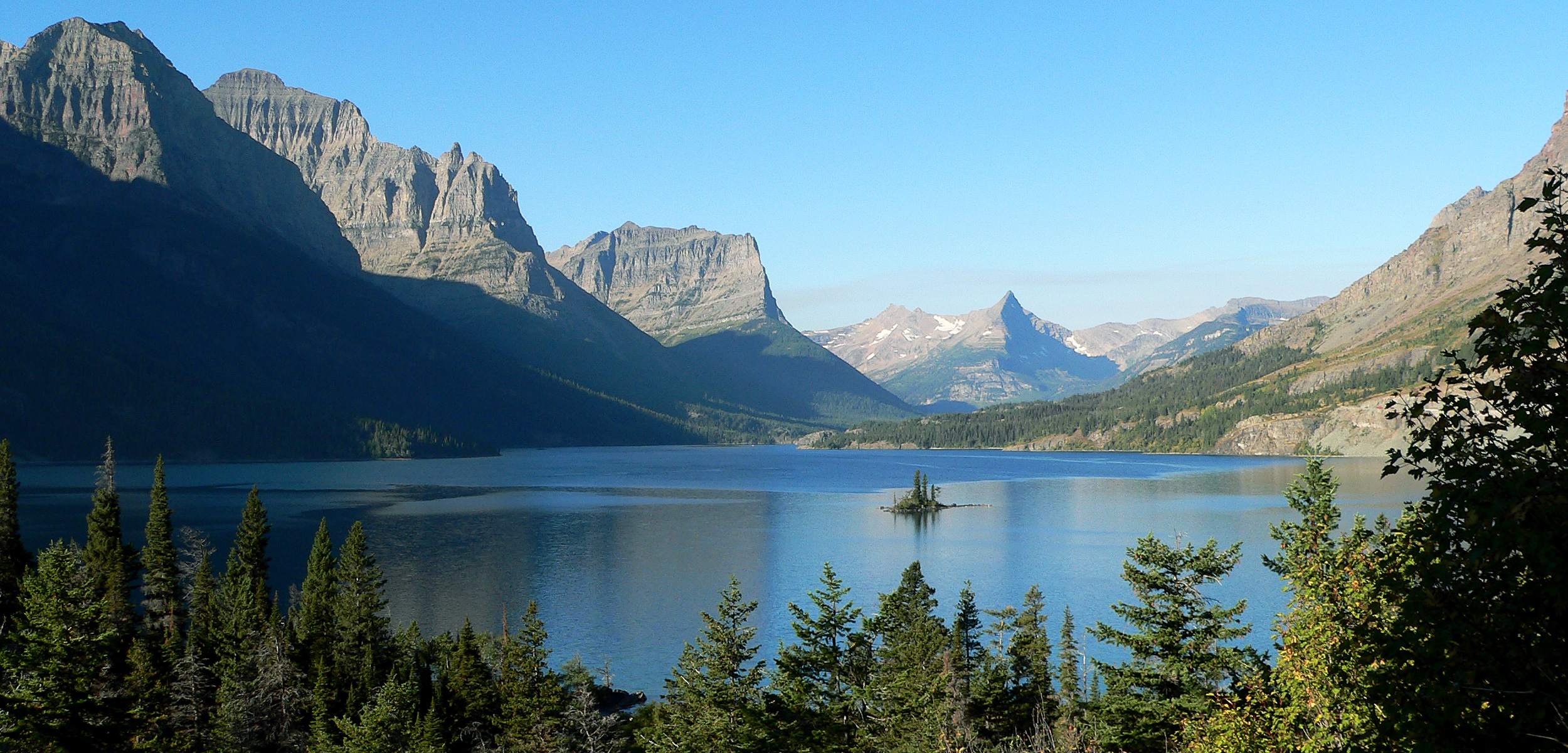
- Saint Mary Lake and Wild Goose Island

- Location within Montana Location within the United States
- Location: Glacier National Park (U.S.), Glacier County, Montana
- Coordinates: 48°40′58″N 113°32′44″W
- Type: Natural
- Primary outflows: St. Mary River (Alberta–Montana)
- Basin countries: United States
- Max. length: 9.9 mi (15.9 km)
- Surface area: 3,923 acres (15.88 km^{2})
- Max. depth: 300 ft (91 m)
- Surface elevation: 4,484 ft (1,367 m)

Saint Mary Lake is the second-largest lake in Glacier National Park, in the U.S. state of Montana.

Located on the east side of the park, Going-to-the-Sun Road parallels the lake along its north shore. At an elevation of 4,484 feet (1,367 m), Saint Mary Lake's waters are colder and lie almost 1,500 feet (460 m) higher in elevation than Lake McDonald, the largest lake in the park, which is located on the west side of the Continental Divide. Here, the Great Plains end and the Rocky Mountains begin in an abrupt 5,000-foot (1,500 m) elevation change, with Little Chief Mountain posing a formidable southern flank above the west end of the lake.

The lake is 9.9 miles (15.9 km) long and 300 feet (91 m) deep with a surface area of 3,923 acres (15.88 km^{2}). The waters of the lake rarely rise above 50 °F (10 °C) and are home to various species of trout. During the winter, the lake is often frozen over with ice up to 4 feet (1.2 m) thick.

The opening scene of the 1980 Stanley Kubrick film The Shining was shot at Saint Mary Lake.

Wild Goose Island rises a mere 14 feet (4.3 m) above the lake. The island is dwarfed by the lake and surrounding mountains, yet it is one of the most frequently photographed locations along the Going-to-the-Sun Road.

== Gallery ==
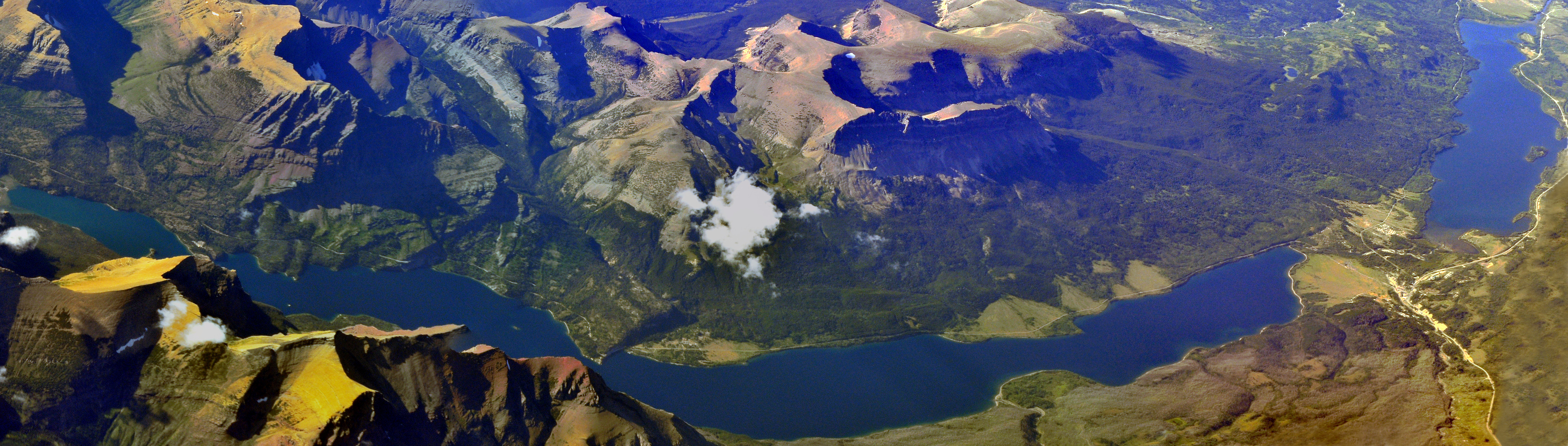
Aerial panorama

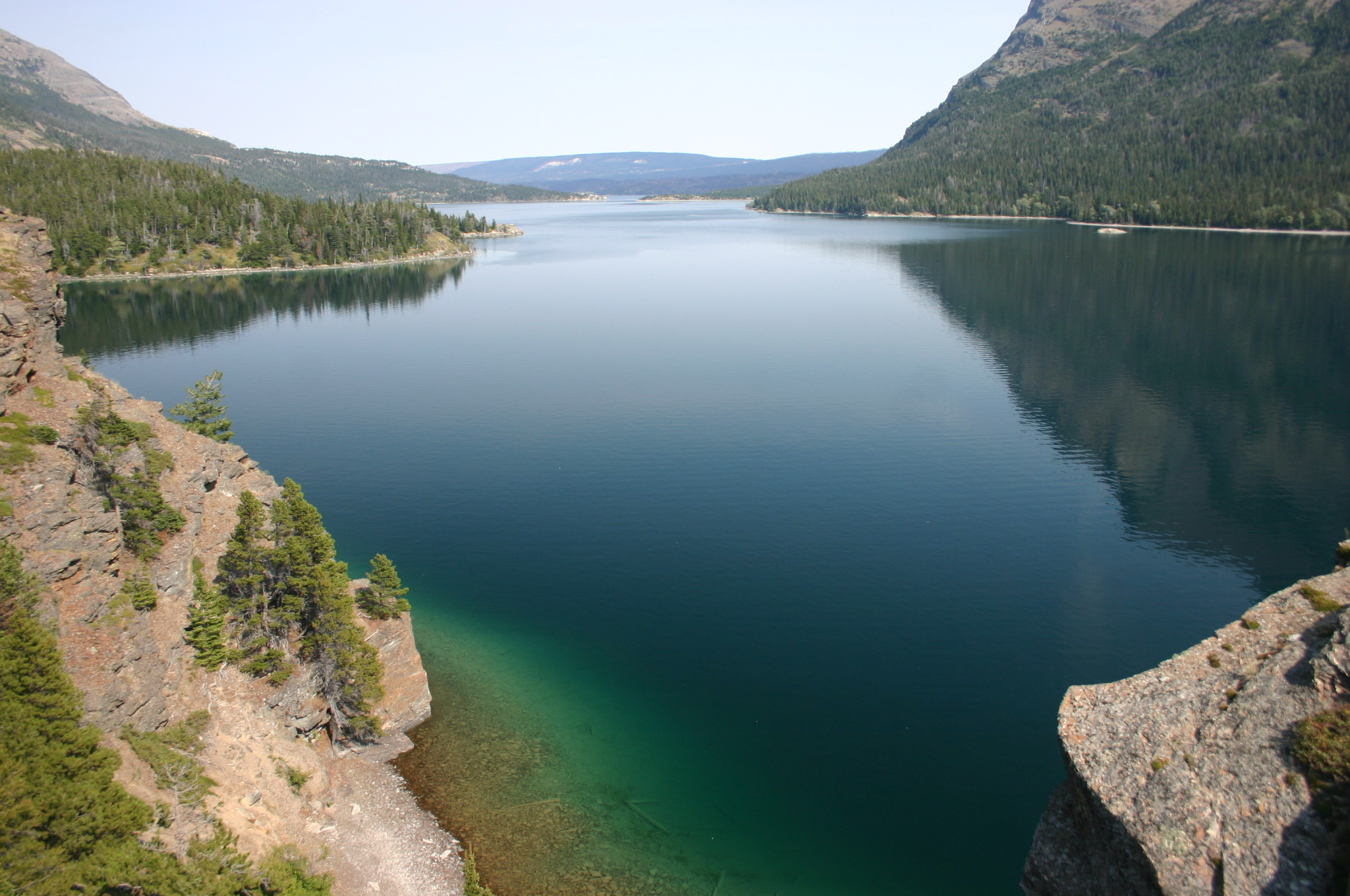
From Sun Point

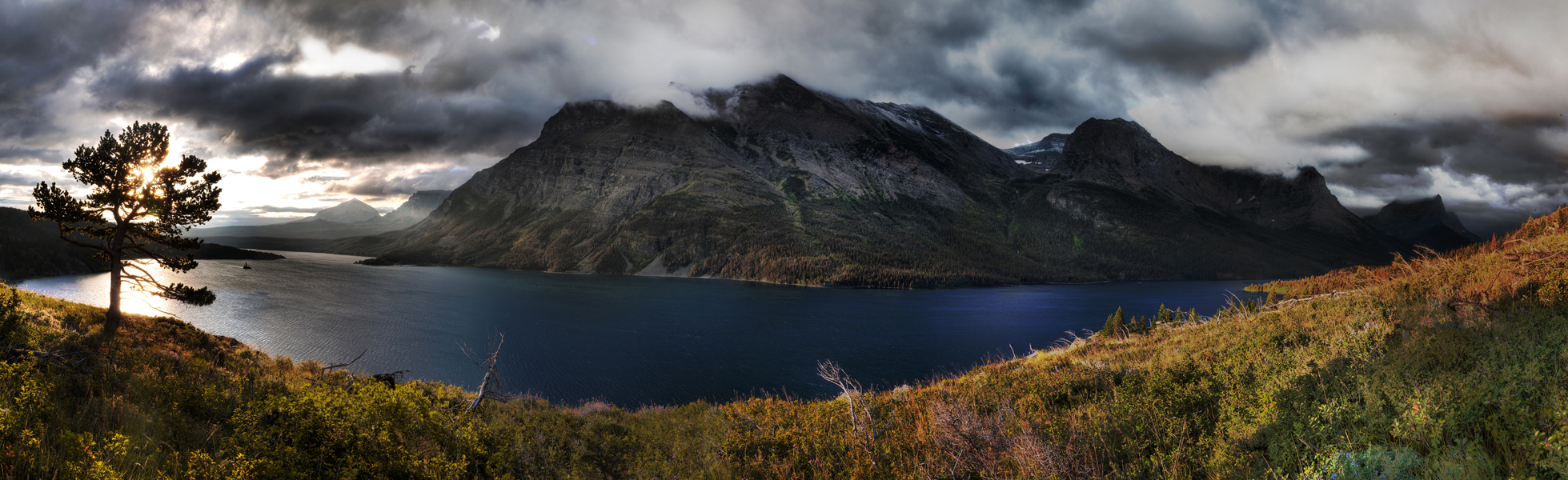
Lakeside panorama

== See also ==
- List of lakes in Glacier County, Montana
