= North Fork Flathead River =

River in Canada and the United States

North Fork Flathead River North Fork of Flathead River, North Fork of the Flathead River
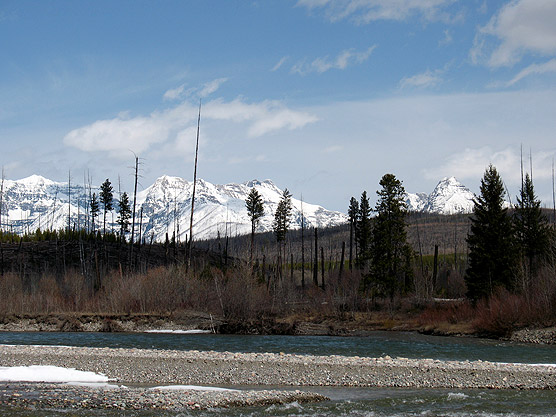
- The river at the boundary of Glacier National Park

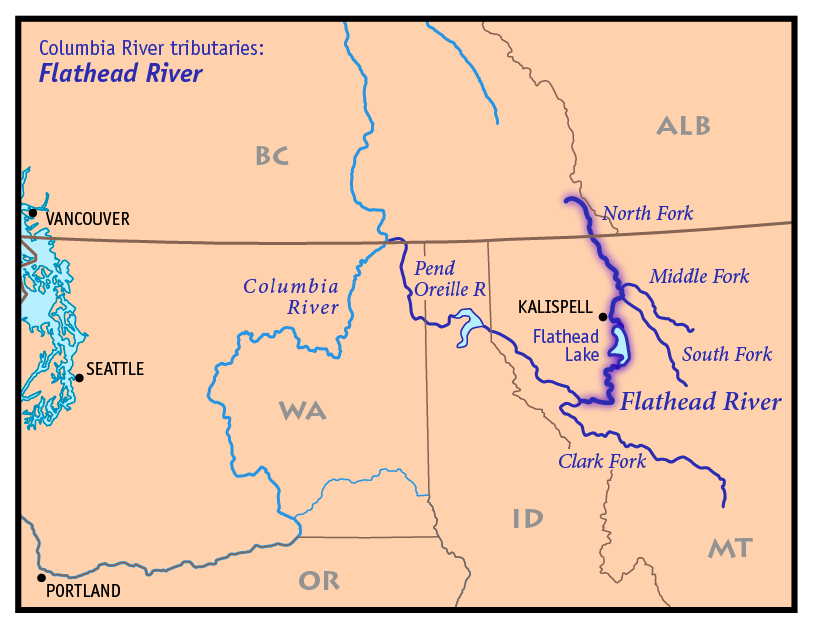
- Map of the Flathead River drainage basin showing the North Fork

Location
- Country: Canada, United States
- Province: British Columbia
- State: Montana
- City: West Glacier, Montana

Physical characteristics
- Source: Clark Range
  - location: British Columbia, Canada
  - coordinates: 49°19′56″N 114°51′09″W
- Mouth: Flathead River
  - coordinates: 48°28′02″N 114°04′09″W
  - elevation: 3,120 ft (950 m)
- Length: 153 mi (246 km)
- Basin size: 1,560 sq mi (4,000 km^{2})
- Discharge
  - location: USGS gage #1235550, 4.1 miles (6.6 km) from the mouth
  - average: 2,976 cu ft/s (84.3 m^{3}/s)
  - minimum: 190 cu ft/s (5.4 m^{3}/s)
  - maximum: 69,100 cu ft/s (1,960 m^{3}/s)

Basin features
- Tributaries
  - left: Canyon Creek; South Fork Canyon Creek, Kimmerly Creek, Depuy Creek, McGinnis Creek

National Wild and Scenic River
- Designated: October 12, 1976

The North Fork Flathead River (Ktunaxa: kqaskanmituk) is a 153-mile (246 km) river flowing through British Columbia, Canada, south into the U.S. state of Montana. It is one of the three primary forks of the Flathead River, the main inflow of Flathead Lake and a tributary of the Columbia River via the Clark Fork River and the Pend Oreille River. The river is sometimes considered the upper headwaters of the Flathead River, although the North Fork is its official name in the U.S. Other naming conventions for the river include Flathead River - North Fork, North Fork of Flathead River, and North Fork of the Flathead River.

== Description ==
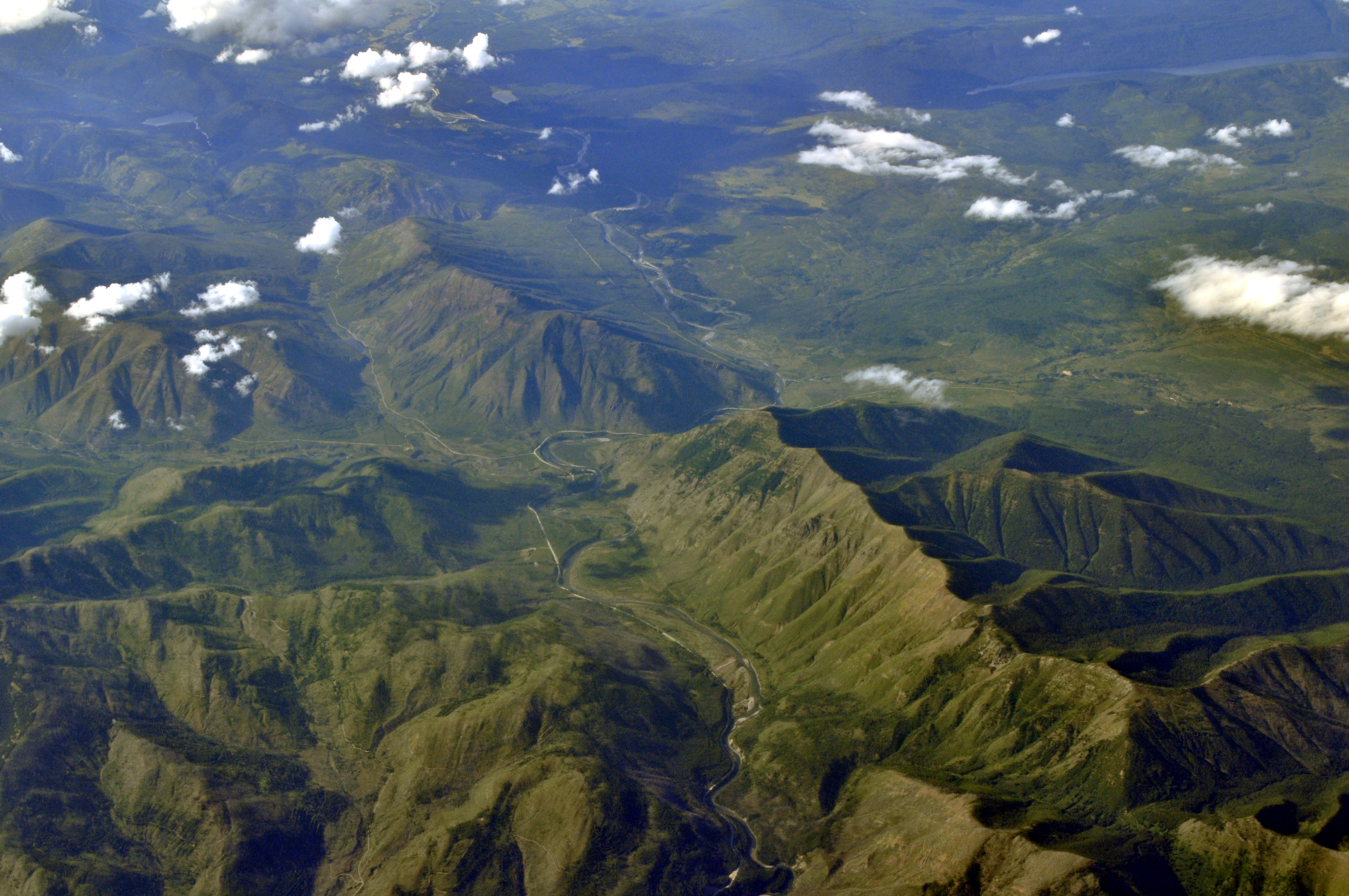
Aerial view of North Fork Flathead River (August 2013), roughly from the south. The river runs roughly from top center to bottom center. The transverse portion of the river near the middle of the image is south of Demers Ridge.

The river originates in a valley northeast of Lake Koocanusa in the Clark Range, and flows west. It then meets the Continental Divide and turns south, winding through a broad glacial valley. The river then crosses the Canada–US border into the state of Montana, where it begins to delineate the western boundary of Glacier National Park. Roughly following the "inner" and "outer" North Fork Roads and Montana Secondary Highway 486, the river winds southwest past Kintla Lake, Bowman Lake, Quartz Lake, Logging Lake, and Lake McDonald, then turns west and south into a narrower valley before joining the Middle Fork Flathead River near the southwestern entrance of the national park, several miles northeast of Columbia Falls. Less than 6 miles (9.7 km) below this confluence, the combined river joins the South Fork Flathead River, forming the main Flathead River.

== Wild and Scenic River designation ==
Although the North Fork is designated as a National Wild and Scenic River (1975) in the United States, its greater length in BC (31 miles (50 km), not including headwaters forks) is not. Water in the BC section remains relatively pure as there are no permanent residents or livestock in this drainage north of the border.

== Dam proposal ==
In the 1940s the Glacier View Dam was proposed, which would have flooded much of the river's valley between Glacier View Mountain and the Canada–US border. Supported by Flathead Valley interests, the dam and reservoir were opposed by the National Park Service, as between 10,000 acres (4,000 ha) and 20,000 acres (8,100 ha) of park lands would have been flooded. The proposed dam was cancelled by 1950.

== See also ==
- List of rivers of Montana
- List of rivers of British Columbia
- Hungry Horse Reservoir
