= Ruger Lake =

Lake in the American state of Montana

- Location within Montana Location within the United States
- Location: Glacier National Park, Flathead County, Montana, US
- Coordinates: 48°44′15″N 113°55′00″W
- Type: Natural
- Primary outflows: Camas Creek
- Basin countries: United States
- Max. length: .40 mi (0.64 km)
- Max. width: .20 mi (0.32 km)
- Surface elevation: 5,802 ft (1,768 m)

Ruger Lake is located in Glacier National Park, in the U. S. state of Montana. Ruger Lake is situated in the Upper Camas Valley, and is .50 miles (0.80 km) south of Lake Evangeline. Nearby mountains include Longfellow Peak and Paul Bunyans Cabin to the west.

== See also ==
- List of lakes in Flathead County, Montana (A-L)
