= Lower Quartz Lake =

Lake in Flathead County, Montana

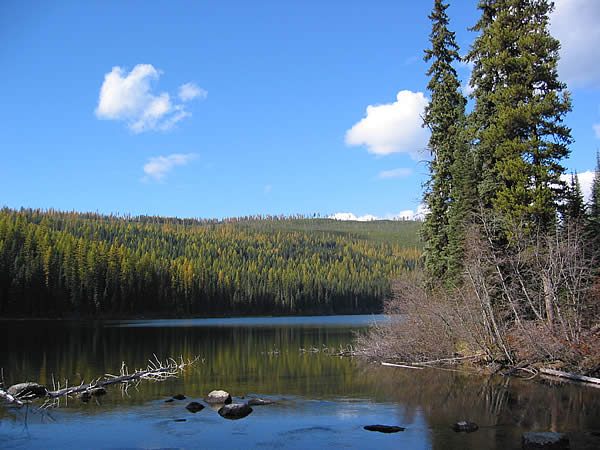
- Lower Quartz Lake

- Location within Montana Location within the United States
- Location: Glacier National Park, Flathead County, Montana, US
- Coordinates: 48°48′25″N 114°10′25″W
- Type: Natural
- Primary inflows: Quartz Creek
- Primary outflows: Quartz Creek
- Basin countries: United States
- Max. length: 1.25 mi (2.01 km)
- Max. width: .25 mi (0.40 km)
- Surface elevation: 4,191 ft (1,277 m)

Lower Quartz Lake is located in Glacier National Park, in the U. S. state of Montana. Lower Quartz Lake is 1.5 miles (2.4 km) southwest of Quartz Lake. Lower Quartz Lake is a 3 miles (4.8 km) hike from the Bowman Lake Picnic Area.

== See also ==
- List of lakes in Flathead County, Montana (A-L)
