= Grace Lake =

Lake in Montana, United States

- Location within Montana Location within the United States
- Location: Glacier National Park, Flathead County, Montana, US
- Coordinates: 48°47′30″N 114°00′04″W
- Type: Natural
- Primary inflows: Logging Creek
- Primary outflows: Logging Creek
- Basin countries: United States
- Max. length: .80 mi (1.29 km)
- Max. width: .25 mi (0.40 km)
- Surface elevation: 3,966 ft (1,209 m)

Grace Lake is located in Glacier National Park, in the U. S. state of Montana. Grace Lake is 1.15 miles (1.85 km) northeast of Logging Lake. Mount Geduhn is located to the east of Grace Lake.

== See also ==
- List of lakes in Flathead County, Montana (A-L)
- There is also a Grace Lake, near to Blachford Lake in Northwestern Canada.
