= Bearhead Mountain =

Bearhead Mountain may refer to:

- Bearhead Mountain (Montana), located in Glacier National Park (U.S.)
- Bearhead Mountain (Washington), located in the Cascade Range
