= Lake Five =

Lake Five may refer to:

- Lake Five, lake in Michigan
- Lake Five, lake in Montana
- Lake Five, community and lake in Wisconsin
