= Jackstraw Lake =

Lake in Flathead County, Montana, United States

- Location within Montana Location within the United States
- Location: Glacier National Park, Flathead County, Montana, US
- Coordinates: 48°24′41″N 113°21′46″W
- Lake type: Natural
- Basin countries: United States
- Max. length: .10 mi (0.16 km)
- Max. width: .10 mi (0.16 km)
- Surface elevation: 6,138 ft (1,871 m)

Jackstraw Lake is located in Glacier National Park, in the U. S. state of Montana. Jackstraw Lake is .80 miles (1.29 km) south of Bearhead Mountain.

== See also ==
- List of lakes in Flathead County, Montana (A-L)
