= Logging Mountain =

Mountain in the state of Montana

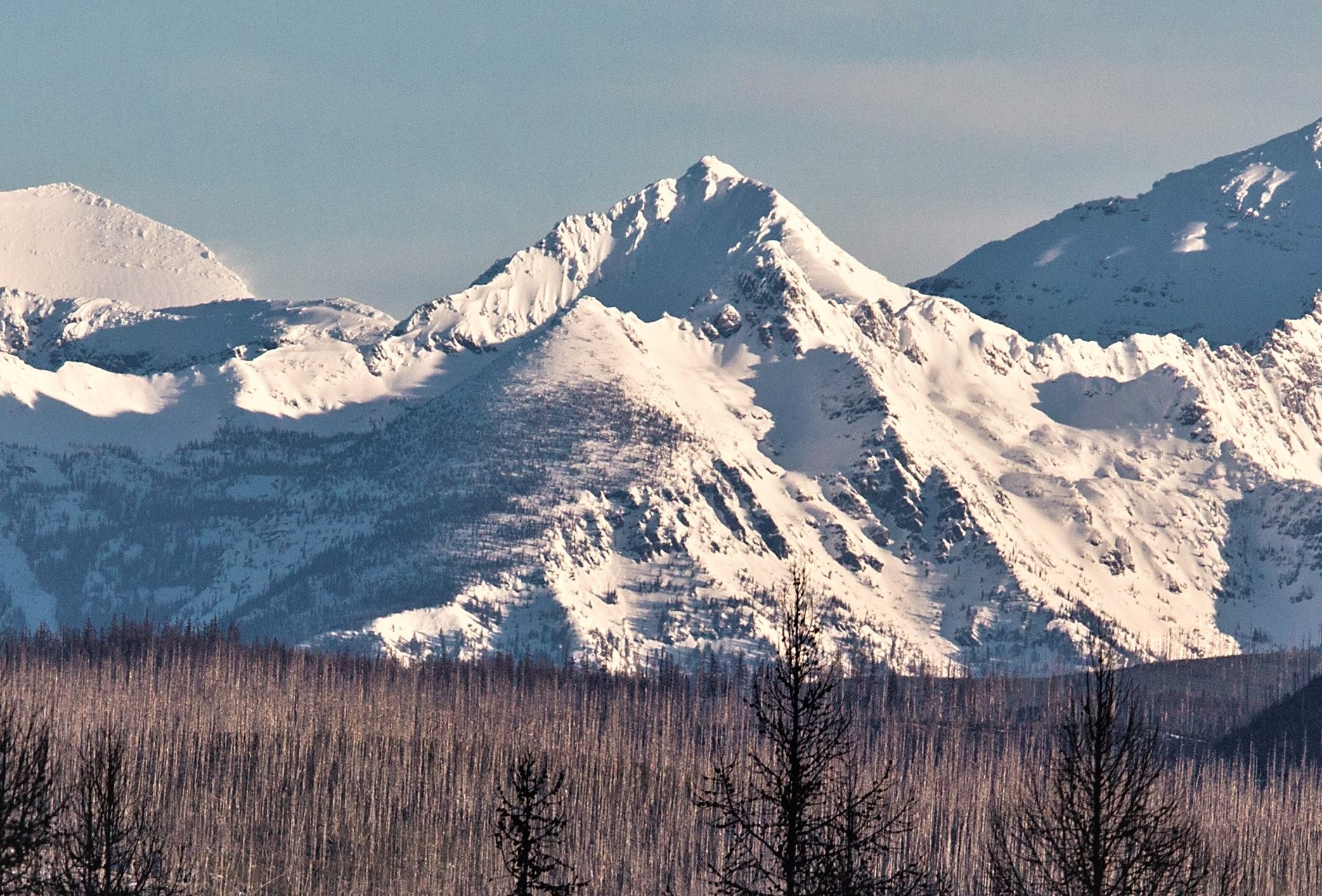
- South aspect

Highest point
- Elevation: 8,570 ft (2,610 m)
- Prominence: 926 ft (282 m)
- Coordinates: 48°48′21″N 114°02′49″W

Geography
- Location within Montana Location within the United States
- Location: Flathead County, Montana, U.S.
- Parent range: Livingston Range
- Topo map(s): USGS Vulture Peak, MT

Logging Mountain (8,570 feet (2,612 m)) is located in the Livingston Range, Glacier National Park in the U.S. state of Montana. Logging Mountain rises more than 4,700 feet (1,400 m) above Logging Lake.

== See also ==
- List of mountains and mountain ranges of Glacier National Park (U.S.)

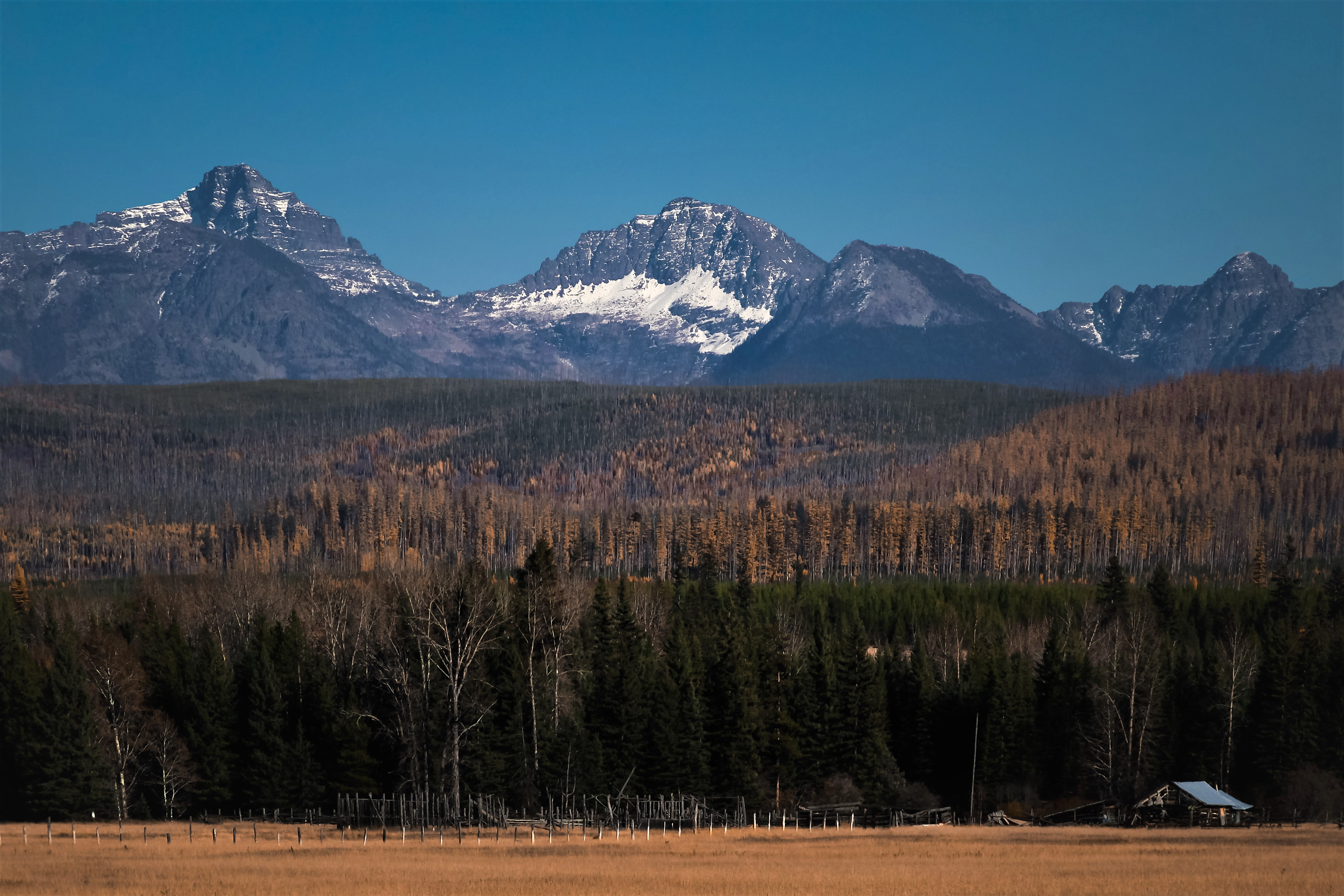
West aspect of Logging Mountain, centered. (The south peak of Vulture Peak to left.)

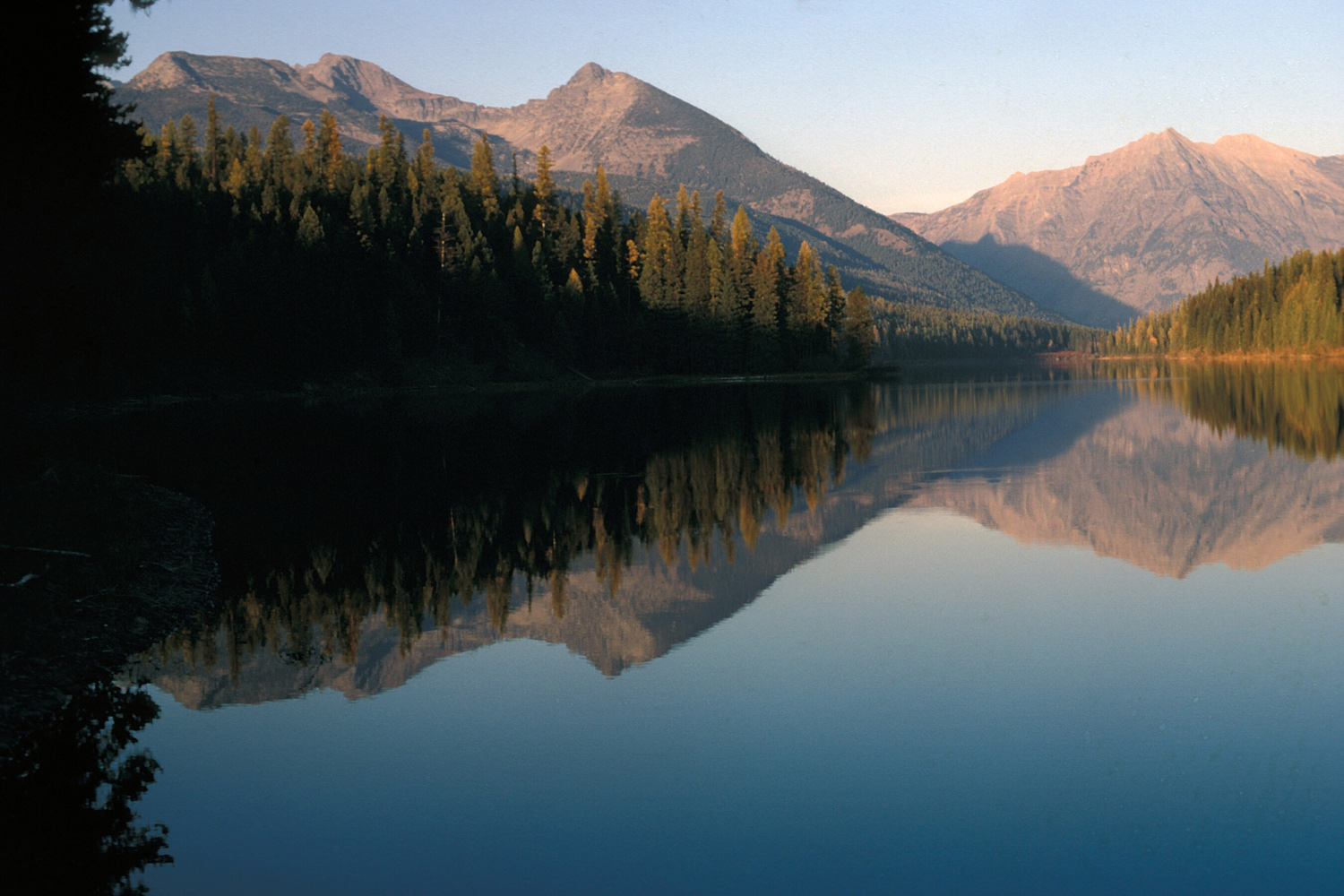
Logging Mountain (left) from Logging Lake. (Mount Geduhn to right)
