= Middle Quartz Lake =

Lake in Flathead County, Montana

- Location within Montana Location within the United States
- Location: Glacier National Park, Flathead County, Montana, US
- Coordinates: 48°49′23″N 114°08′29″W
- Type: Natural
- Primary inflows: Quartz Creek
- Primary outflows: Quartz Creek
- Basin countries: United States
- Max. length: .40 mi (0.64 km)
- Max. width: .25 mi (0.40 km)
- Surface elevation: 4,397 ft (1,340 m)
- Islands: 1

Middle Quartz Lake is located in Glacier National Park, in the U. S. state of Montana. Middle Quartz Lake is only 150 yards (140 m) west of Quartz Lake. Middle Quartz Lake is a 6 miles (9.7 km) hike from the Bowman Lake Picnic Area.

== See also ==
- List of lakes in Flathead County, Montana (M-Z)
