= Almeda Lake =

- Location within Montana
- Location: Flathead County, Montana
- Coordinates: 48°15′19″N 113°42′17″W
- Type: Lake

Almeda Lake is a lake in the U.S. state of Montana.

Almeda Lake is named after the wife of Thomas Shields (who himself is the namesake to Shields Creek).

== See also ==
- List of lakes in Flathead County, Montana (A-L)
