= Paradise Dam (Montana) =

Unbuilt dam on the Clark Fork River, Montana, US

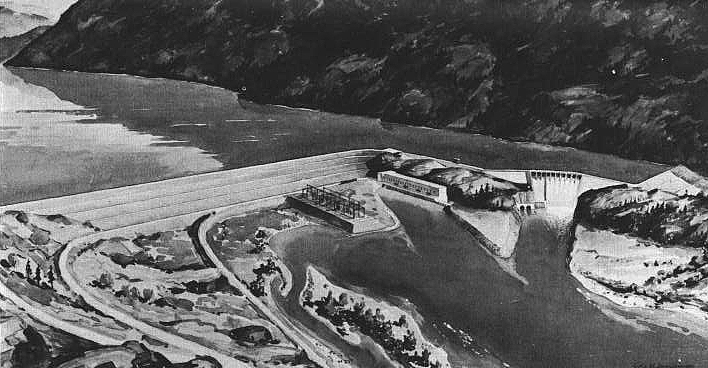
- Paradise Dam as proposed

- Location within Montana
- Location: Sanders County, near Paradise, Montana, USA
- Coordinates: 47°24′57″N 114°50′00″W
- Status: Cancelled
- Operator: U.S. Army Corps of Engineers

Dam and spillways
- Impounds: Clark Fork River and Flathead River
- Height: 250 ft (76 m)
- Length: 3,750 ft (1,140 m)
- Spillway type: Gated spillway

Reservoir
- Creates: Paradise Reservoir
- Total capacity: 4,080,000 acre-feet (5.03 km^{3})
- Surface area: 103 square miles (270 km^{2})

Power Station
- Turbines: 8 x 72 MW turbines, 6 additional to be installed later
- Installed capacity: 576 MW initially 1000 MW in a later phase

Paradise Dam was a proposed dam on the Clark Fork River in Montana. It was proposed by the U.S. Army Corps of Engineers as an alternative to the construction of Glacier View Dam on the western boundary of Glacier National Park, to capture the flow of the Flathead River. The earth embankment dam was planned to be about 250 feet (76 m) high, impounding a reservoir of 4,080,000 acre-feet (5.03 km^{3}). While it was viewed as a desirable power generation and water storage project by the Corps of Engineers, it was opposed by those it would displace from towns and productive agricultural lands, and was never built.

== Proposal ==
The dam was proposed in the 1940s as an alternative to the controversial Glacier View Dam, which was strenuously opposed by the National Park Service and conservation organizations as an intrusion into national park lands. It would have inundated 9,000 acres (3,600 ha) of already-irrigated and farmed lands, with the reservoir extending 49 miles (79 km) up the Clark Fork and 72 miles (116 km) up the Flathead to the base of SKQ Dam. The project required the relocation of roads, rail lines and houses and businesses in several communities. The cost in 1950 was estimated at $265,569,000.

Alternative sites at The Plains, five miles downstream from Plains, Montana, and the Weeks site, three miles downstream from the Plains site, were examined but rejected on grounds of poor foundation conditions. Three other sites, Knowles (river mile 4), Perma (river mile 11) and Oxbow (river mile 41) were rejected on similar grounds.

== Reception ==
While the project was supported by some local organizations, local opposition was intense, focusing on displacement of productive agriculture and populations and intrusion on Indian rights. Land replacement compensation for the National Bison Range was considered likely. As a result, planning was not pursued and the project remained an alternative to other project farther upstream. In the event, none of the proposed reservoirs in the area were built, apart from Hungry Horse Reservoir.

== Description ==
The complex arrangement placed a 250-foot (76 m) earth embankment across the main channel of the river, diverting the flow to the west, where a straight intake dam structure extending parallel to the riverbed on the riverbank would receive water for the powerplant. A separate curved spillway dam would be located downstream from the intake dam. At the end of the diverted channel an embankment saddle dam would seal the channel. The powerplant was planned to have an initial capacity of 576 MW with eight 72MW units, expandable to 1000 MW with six more generators in the future.
