= Dean Lake (Montana) =

- Location within Montana Location within the United States
- Location: Flathead County, Montana
- Coordinates: 47°55′26″N 113°06′30″W
- Type: lake
- Basin countries: United States
- Surface elevation: 7,365 ft (2,245 m)

Dean Lake is a lake in the U.S. state of Montana.

Dean Lake was named after Richard Dean, a local ranger.

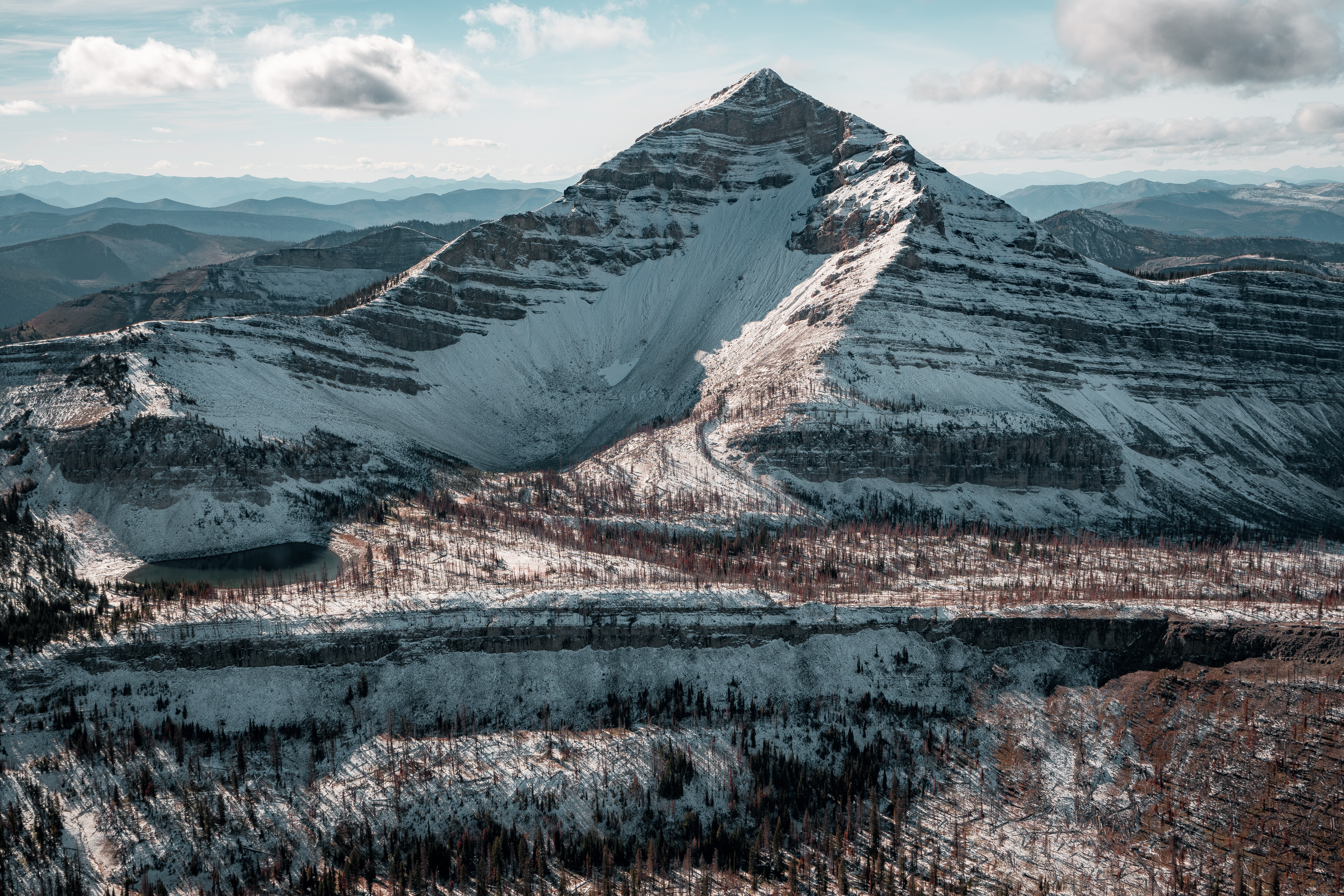
Dean Lake to the left, below Pentagon Mountain

== See also ==
- List of lakes in Flathead County, Montana (A-L)
