= Lost Coon Lake =

Lake in the American state of Montana

- Location within Montana
- Location: Flathead County, Montana
- Coordinates: 48°23′46″N 114°21′36″W
- Type: lake

Lost Coon Lake, is a lake south of Whitefish, Flathead County in the state of Montana, USA. This lake was once known to be home to a variety of fish and can be fished by fly rod or baitcasting. Alternate names for this lake include Lost Loon Lake.

Lost Coon Lake was originally known as "Nigger Lake". It was named in the late 1800s or early 1900s. The name allegedly came about from the fact that an African American woman named Mrs. Randals ran a rooming house for lumberjacks near the lake. Although a historic attempt at racism, the name was not accurate as many later claimed that Mrs. Randals was of Spanish descent.

The name began to cause controversy in the mid 20th century when Washington bureaus began to refuse ice harvest contracts with the name on them. They began to reference the lake as "Lodgepole Lake", while locals continued to call it "Nigger Lake".

By the 1980s when upscale developments were being targeted for the area, perhaps as a compromise of sorts, the lake was renamed "Lost Coon Lake". In August 2020 the City of Whitefish filed a petition to change the name to "Lost Loon Lake".

== See also ==
- List of lakes in Flathead County, Montana (A-L)
- Whitefish, Montana
