= Camas Lake =

Lake in the American state of Montana

- Location within Montana Location within the United States
- Location: Glacier National Park, Flathead County, Montana, US
- Coordinates: 48°44′24″N 113°53′02″W
- Lake type: Natural
- Primary inflows: Camas Creek
- Primary outflows: Camas Creek
- Basin countries: United States
- Max. length: .35 mi (0.56 km)
- Max. width: .15 mi (0.24 km)
- Surface elevation: 5,076 ft (1,547 m)
- Islands: 1

Camas Lake is located in Glacier National Park, in the U. S. state of Montana. Camas Lake is situated in the Camas Valley, and is 1.25 miles (2.01 km) southeast of Lake Evangeline. Camas Lake is a 13 miles (21 km) hike one way from the trailhead along the North Fork Road.

== See also ==
- List of lakes in Flathead County, Montana (A-L)
