= Harrison Lake (Flathead County, Montana) =

Lake in Montana, United States

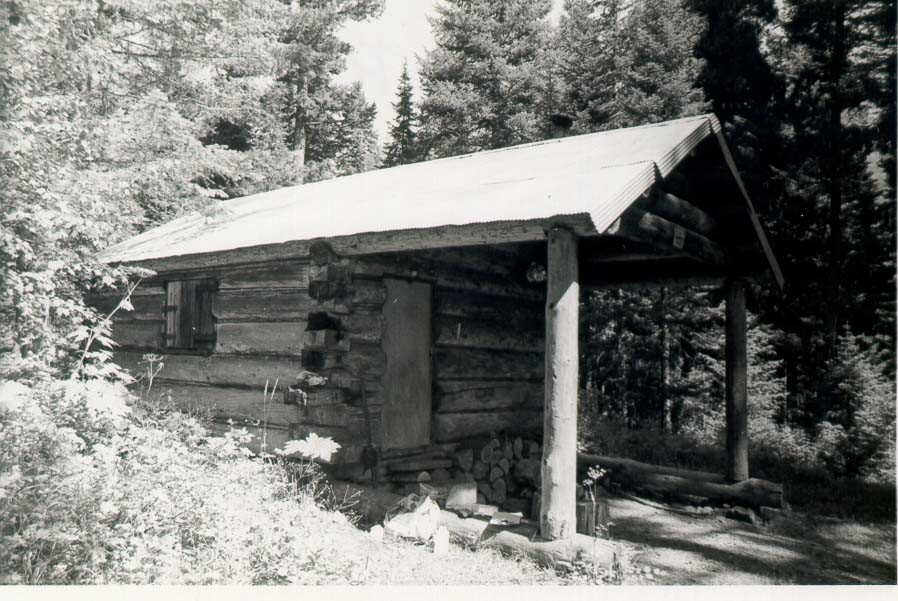
- Harrison Lake Patrol Cabin

- Location within Montana Location within the United States
- Location: Glacier National Park, Flathead County, Montana, US
- Coordinates: 48°31′09″N 113°46′04″W
- Lake type: Natural
- Primary inflows: Harrison Creek
- Primary outflows: Harrison Creek
- Basin countries: United States
- Max. length: 2.5 mi (4.0 km)
- Max. width: .30 mi (0.48 km)
- Surface elevation: 3,693 ft (1,126 m)

Harrison Lake is located in Glacier National Park, in the U. S. state of Montana. Harrison Lake is 2.5 miles (4.0 km) long. Near the eastern end of the lake is the Harrison Lake Patrol Cabin, which is listed on the National Register of Historic Places.

== See also ==
- List of lakes in Flathead County, Montana (A-L)
