= Mount Rockwell =

Mountain in the state of Montana

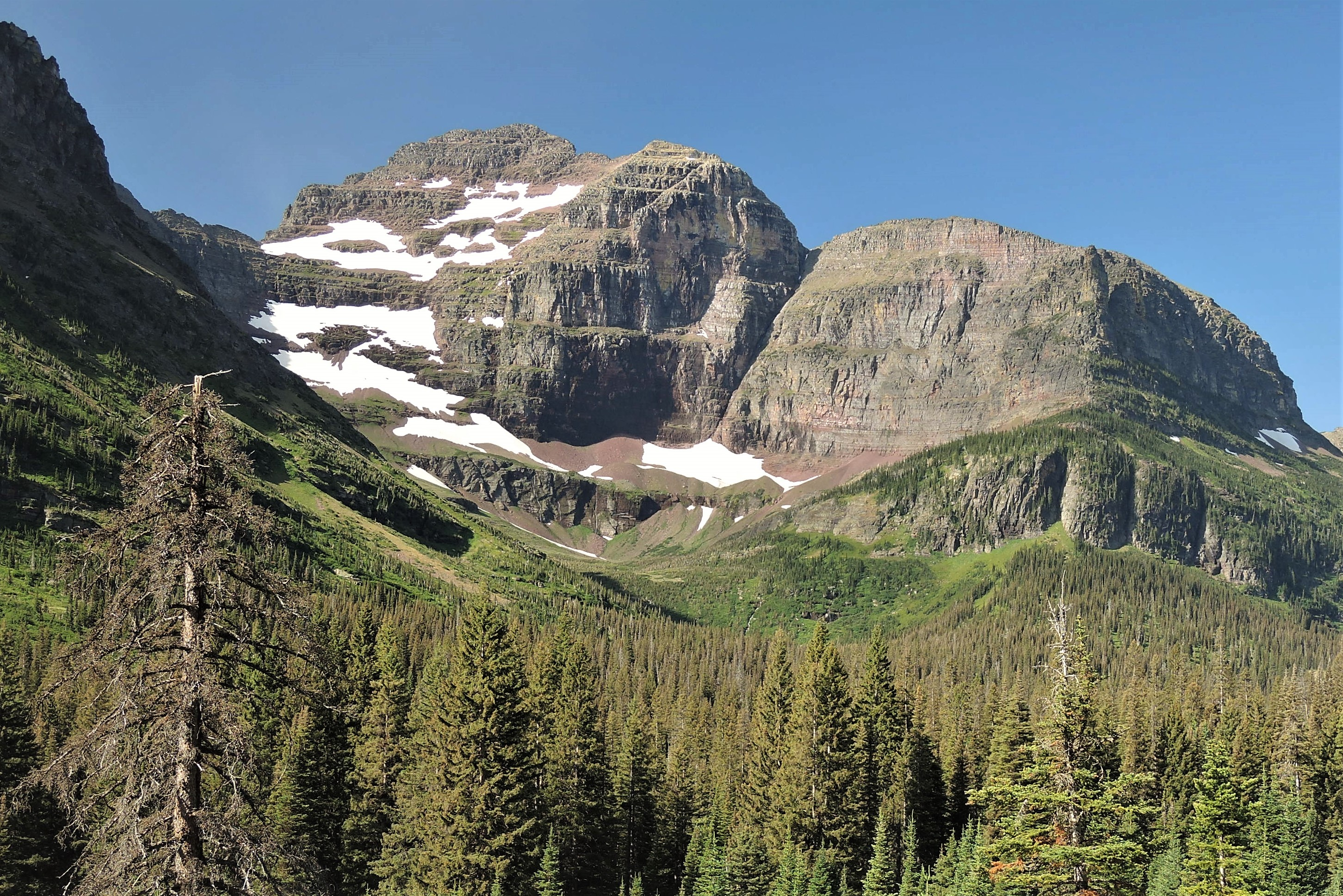
- Northeast aspect

Highest point
- Elevation: 9,277 ft (2,828 m)
- Prominence: 2,192 ft (668 m)
- Coordinates: 48°26′36″N 113°27′04″W

Geography
- Location within Montana Location within the United States
- Location: Flathead County, Montana, Glacier County, Montana, U.S.
- Parent range: Lewis Range
- Topo map(s): USGS Mount Rockwell, MT

Mount Rockwell (9,277 feet (2,828 m)) is located in the Lewis Range, Glacier National Park in the U.S. state of Montana. Mount Rockwell is situated along the Continental Divide and Aurice Lake is just west of the peak. A Blackfeet name for the mountain is "Rising Bull Mountain." It was named for a Blackfeet chief who, after staying with the Flathead people of his wife for a number of winters, was appointed one of their chiefs for his bravery and his kind and generous nature.

== See also ==
- Mountains and mountain ranges of Glacier National Park (U.S.)
