= Frozen Lake (Montana) =

- Location within Montana Location within the United States Location within British Columbia Location within Canada
- Location: Flathead County, Montana
- Coordinates: 48°59′56.92″N 114°40′47.43″W
- Type: lake
- Basin countries: United States, Canada
- Surface elevation: 4,892 ft (1,491 m)

Frozen Lake is a lake in Flathead County, Montana, in the United States. The northern part of the lake is in British Columbia, Canada.

Frozen Lake was named from its tendency to freeze over.

== See also ==
- List of lakes in Montana
- List of lakes in Flathead County, Montana (A-L)
- List of lakes in British Columbia
