= Kintla Lake =

Lake in Flathead County, Montana

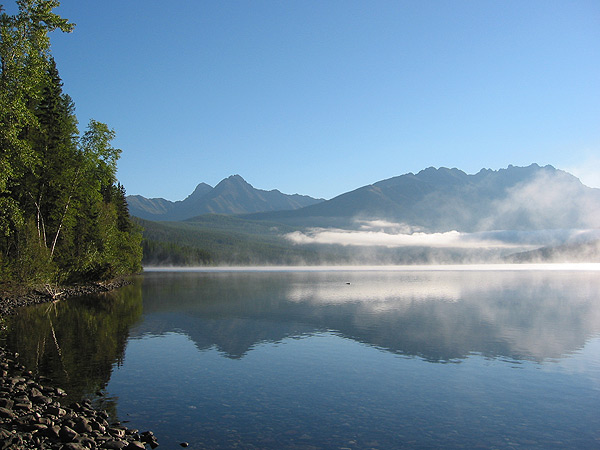
- Fog rolls over the lake's surface, caused by the differing temperatures of the air and the water

- Location within Montana Location within the United States
- Location: Glacier National Park, Flathead County, Montana, US
- Coordinates: 48°57′53″N 114°18′10″W
- Type: Natural
- Primary inflows: Kintla Creek
- Primary outflows: Kintla Creek
- Basin countries: United States
- Max. length: 5 mi (8.0 km)
- Max. width: 0.8 mi (1.3 km)
- Surface area: 1,698 acres (6.87 km^{2})
- Max. depth: 390 ft (120 m)
- Surface elevation: 4,008 ft (1,222 m)

Kintla Lake is a lake in the northwestern portion of Glacier National Park in Montana. The lake is located in a rather remote portion of the park, close to the Canada–United States border. The lake is a 40 mi (64 km) drive from the west entrance along bumpy dirt roads. At 1,698 acres (687 ha), Kintla Lake is only slightly smaller than Bowman Lake, and is the fourth largest lake in the park.

Kintla originates from the Kutenai word for "sack". Kutenai legend states that a man had apparently drowned in one of the lakes which likened the lake to a sack where "once you got in, you couldn't get out".

Canoeing and kayaking are ideal on the lake, as no motorized watercraft are allowed. There is a quiet campground on the lake, and it is rarely filled because of its remote location. Fishing is also popular on the lake, because of the trout found in it. There are also options for day hikes and extended hikes into the backcountry in the area.

== See also ==
- List of lakes in Flathead County, Montana (A-L)
