= Lake Ellen Wilson =

Lake in Glacier National Park, Montana, United States

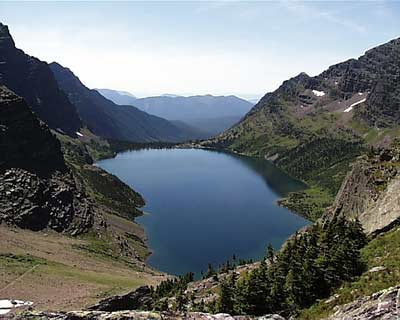
- Lake Ellen Wilson from Gunsight Pass

- Location within Montana Location within the United States
- Location: Glacier National Park, Flathead County, Montana, US
- Coordinates: 48°36′02″N 113°45′20″W
- Type: Natural
- Primary outflows: Lincoln Creek
- Basin countries: United States
- Max. length: 1.10 mi (1.77 km)
- Max. width: .50 mi (0.80 km)
- Surface elevation: 5,929 ft (1,807 m)

Lake Ellen Wilson is located in Glacier National Park, in the U. S. state of Montana. Lake Ellen Wilson is .25 miles (0.40 km) upstream from Lincoln Lake but is more than 1,300 feet (400 m) higher in elevation. A series of cascades including Beaver Chief Falls can be found between the two lakes.

== See also ==
- List of lakes in Flathead County, Montana (A-L)

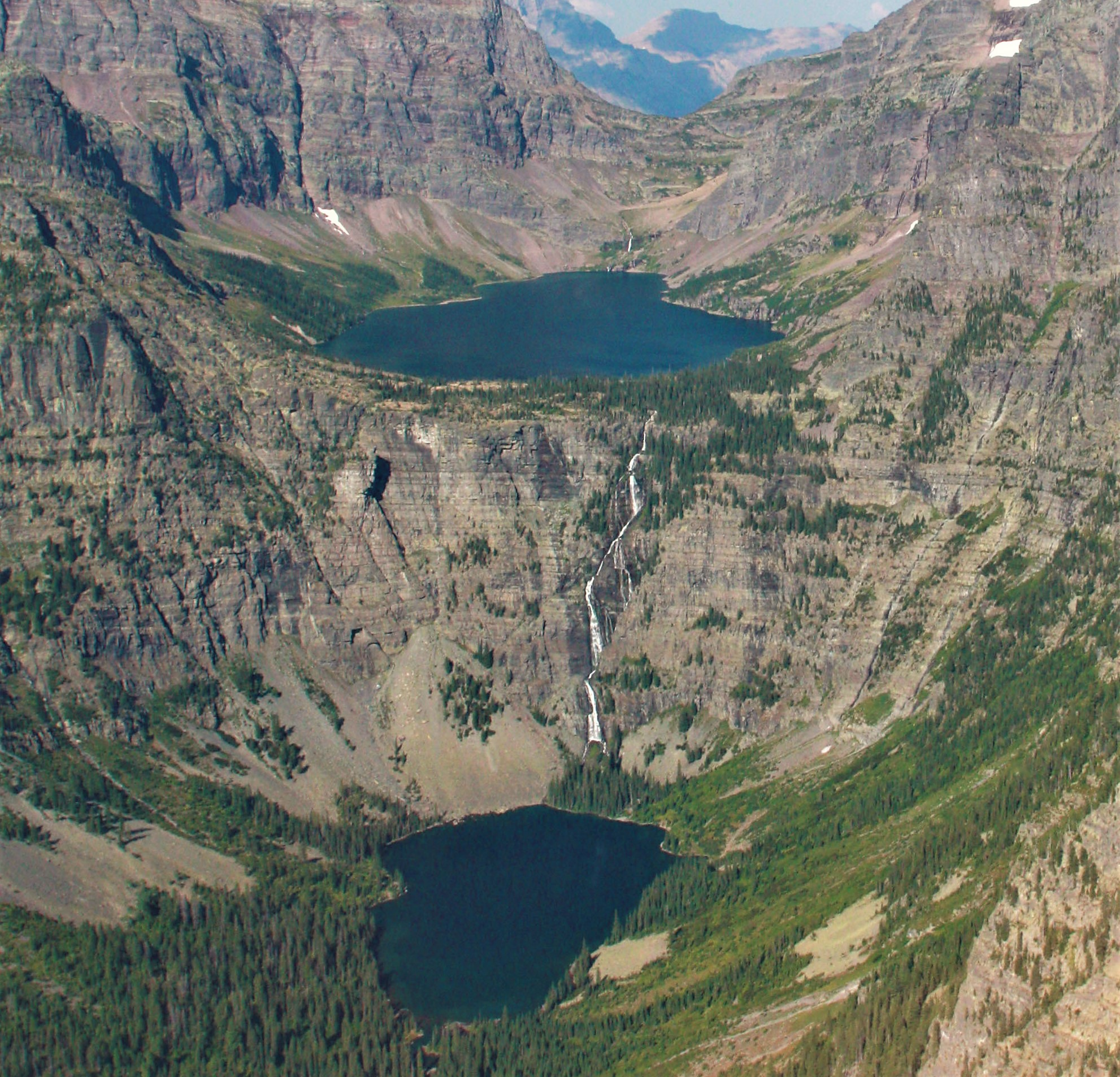
Aerial view of Lake Ellen Wilson (top), Beaver Chief Falls, and Lincoln Lake (bottom)
