= Swanson Boathouse =

- U.S. National Register of Historic Places
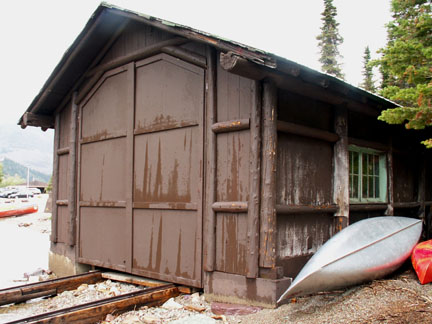

- Location within Montana Location within the United States
- Location: E shore of Two Medicine Lake, Glacier NP, East Glacier, Montana
- Coordinates: 48°28′59″N 113°22′7″W
- Built: 1936
- Architect: Billy Swanson, Swanson Boat Co.
- MPS: Glacier National Park MPS
- NRHP reference No.: 95001577
- Added to NRHP: January 19, 1996

The Swanson Boathouse, also known as the Two Medicine Boathouse, was built in 1936 by concessioner Billy Swanson at Two Medicine Lake in Glacier National Park. The rustic structure remains in its intended use. The boathouse was built by Captain J.W. "Billy" Swanson, who operated a launch on Two Medicine Lake.

== See also ==
- Lower Logging Lake Snowshoe Cabin and Boathouse: another boathouse on the NRHP in Glacier National Park
