= Aurice Lake =

Lake in Flathead County, Montana, United States

- Location within Montana Location within the United States
- Location: Glacier National Park, Flathead County, Montana, US
- Coordinates: 48°26′33″N 113°27′35″W
- Type: Natural
- Basin countries: United States
- Max. length: .20 mi (0.32 km)
- Max. width: .20 mi (0.32 km)
- Surface elevation: 7,325 ft (2,233 m)

Aurice Lake is located in Glacier National Park, in the U. S. state of Montana. Aurice Lake is immediately west of Mount Rockwell.

== See also ==
- List of lakes in Flathead County, Montana (A-L)
