= Mount Geduhn =

Mountain in Montana, United States

- Mount Geduhn as seen from the west-southwest over Logging Lake.

Highest point
- Elevation: 8,379 ft (2,554 m) NAVD 88
- Prominence: 135 ft (41 m)
- Coordinates: 48°47′48″N 113°58′12″W

Naming
- Etymology: Frank Geduhn

Geography
- Location within Montana Location within the United States
- Location: Flathead County, Montana, U.S.
- Parent range: Livingston Range
- Topo map(s): USGS Mount Geduhn, MT

Climbing
- First ascent: Unknown
- Easiest route: Scramble

Mount Geduhn (8,379 feet (2,554 m)) is located in the Livingston Range, Glacier National Park in the U.S. state of Montana. The mountain is named for Frank Geduhn, an early pioneer who had cabins for visitors at the head of Lake McDonald prior to 1900, and who guided Sperry parties on some of their trips into the area.

== Climate ==
Based on the Köppen climate classification, it is located in an alpine subarctic climate zone characterized by long, usually very cold winters, and short, cool to mild summers. Temperatures can drop below −10 °F with wind chill factors below −30 °F.

== Ｇallery ==
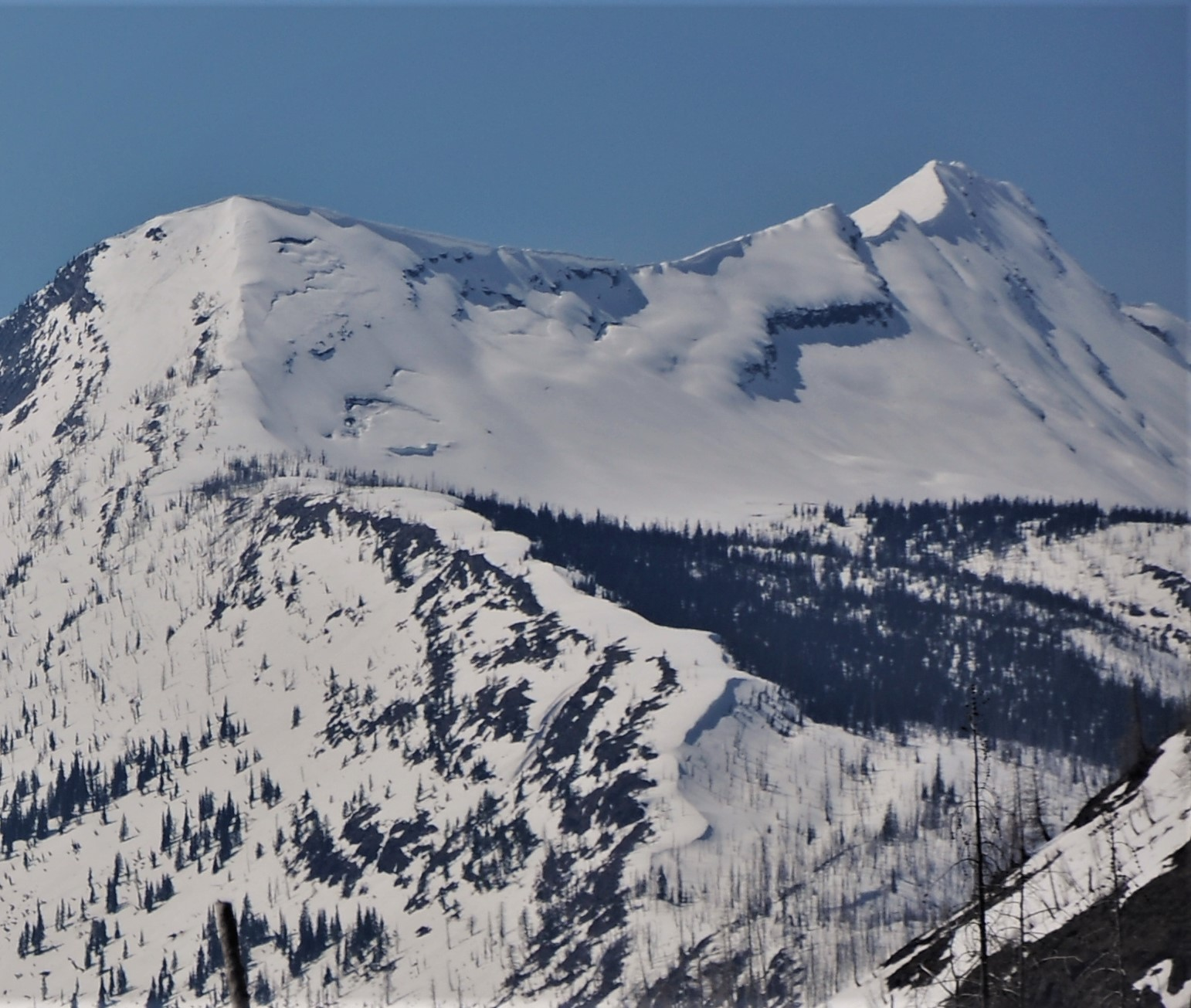
East aspect

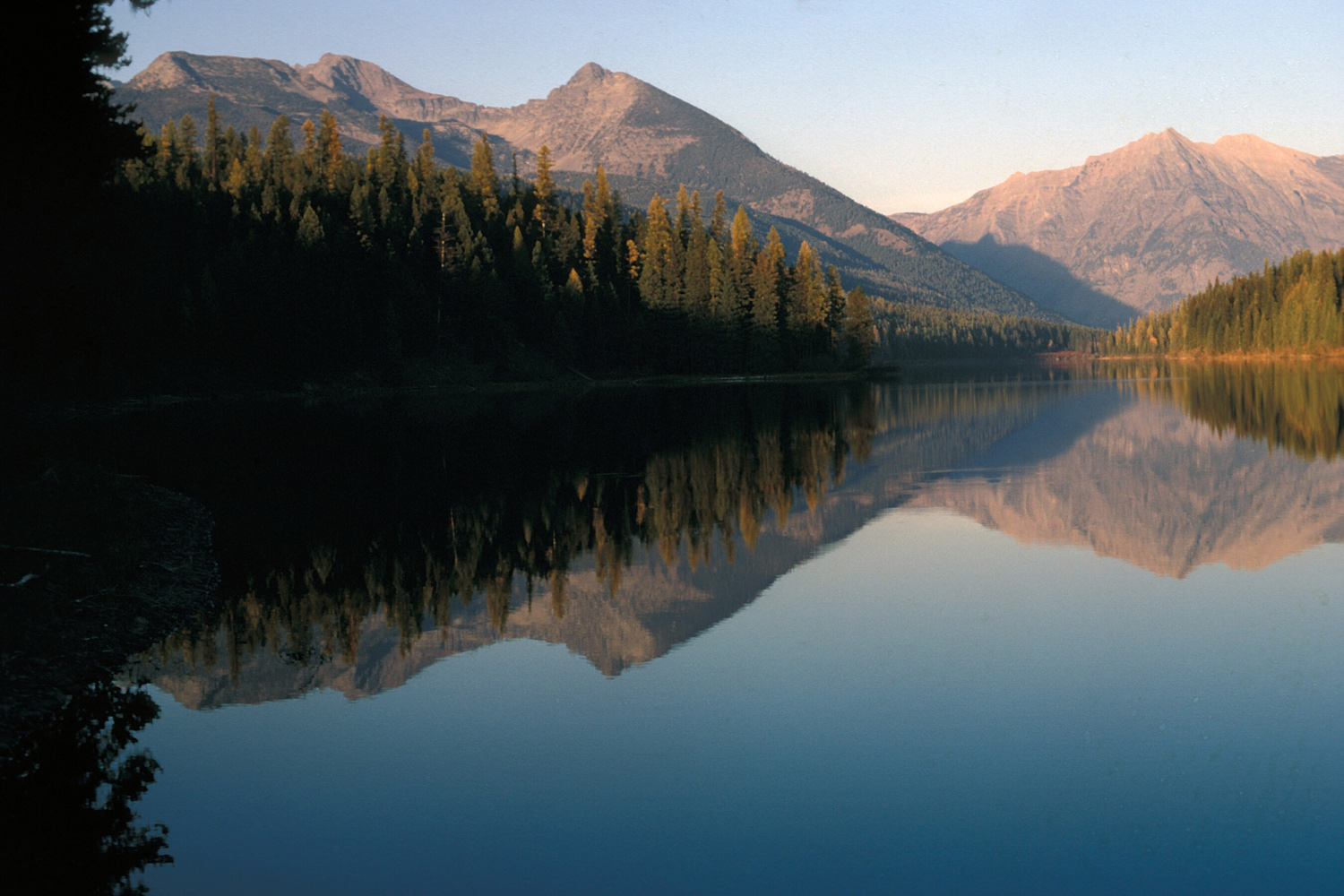
Mt. Geduhn (upper right) seen from Logging Lake.
(Logging Mountain to left)

== See also ==
- List of mountains and mountain ranges of Glacier National Park (U.S.)
