= Salish Mountains =

Mountain range in Montana

Coordinates: 48°16′00″N 114°44′04″W

The Salish Mountains are located in the northwest corner of the U.S. State of Montana. Much of the range is bordered on the east by Flathead Lake. The range is about 100 miles running from Eureka to west of Polson. The tallest peak is McGuire Mountain at 6,991 ft.

With peaks ranging from just under 7,000 feet tall to named hills that are a little short of 3,600 feet in elevation the Salish Mountain range is a lesser known mountain range in northwestern Montana. Many of the peaks in the range are rounded tree-covered summits but occasionally the mountain summits are found on open grassy slopes that afford great views into the surrounding valleys and neighboring mountain ranges. The Salish Mountains cover a triangle-shaped land mass of about 4,125 square miles of lush forests and peaks.

The Salish Mountains are named for the Native Americans who called this area their home for centuries before white man settled here. The Salish originated in the Pacific Northwest and were called the Flathead Indians by the first white men who came to the Columbia River. The Flatheads call themselves Salish meaning "the people".

There are several large lakes in the mountains. These include Lake Mary Ronan, Little Bitterroot Lake, McGregor, Hubbert, Thompson, Ashley, and Talley.

Blacktail Mountain Ski Area, on the third highest peak, is in the range just west of Lakeside, Montana. The second highest peak is Sutton Mountain at 6,872 ft.

== See also ==
- List of mountain ranges in Montana
