= Longfellow Peak =

Mountain in Montana, United States

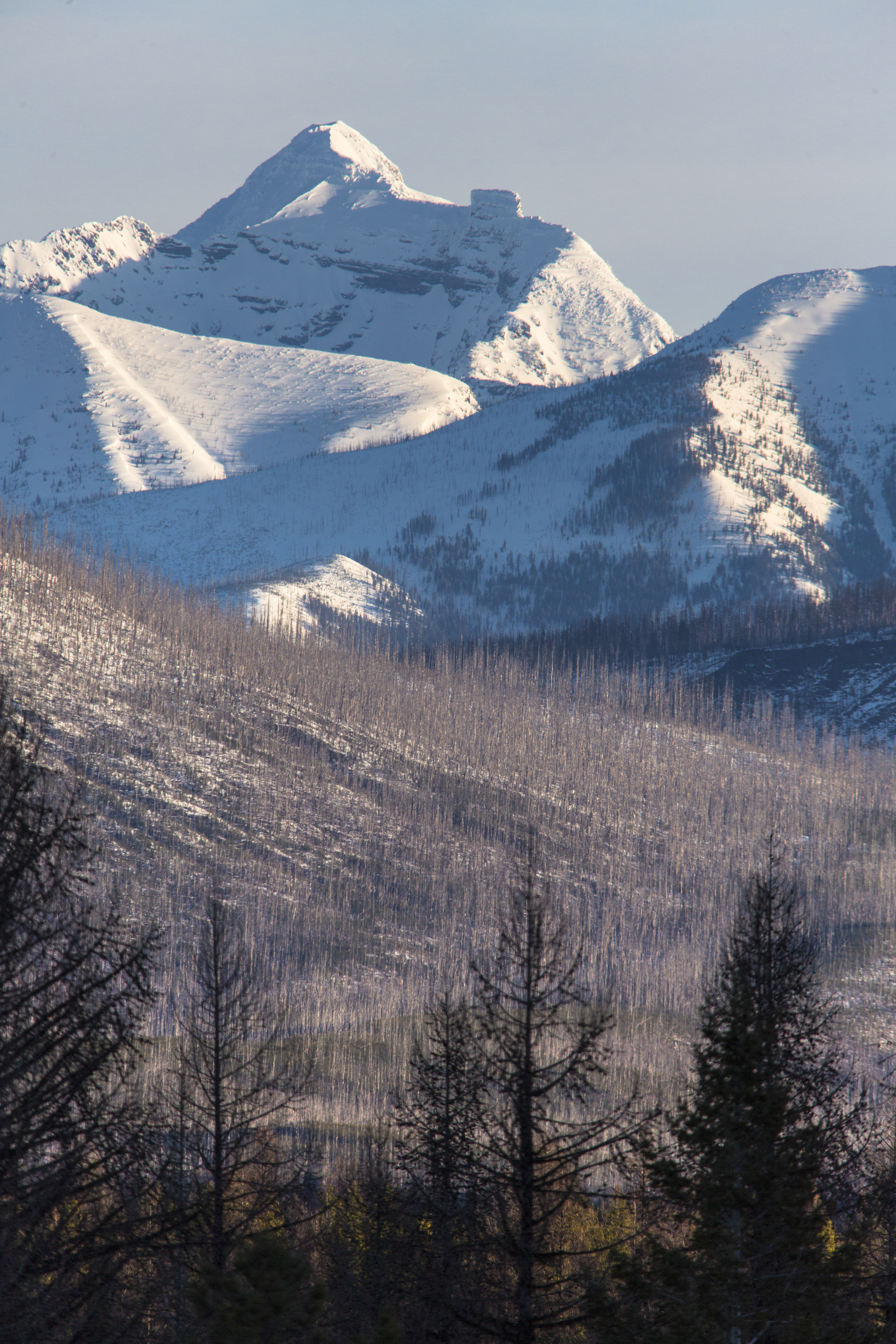

Highest point
- Elevation: 8,904 ft (2,714 m)
- Prominence: 2,744 ft (836 m)
- Coordinates: 48°44′44″N 113°56′21″W

Naming
- Etymology: Henry Wadsworth Longfellow

Geography
- Location within Montana Location within the United States
- Location: Flathead County, Montana, U.S.
- Parent range: Livingston Range
- Topo map(s): USGS Camas Ridge East, MT

Longfellow Peak (8,904 feet (2,714 m)) is located in the Livingston Range, Glacier National Park in the U.S. state of Montana. Longfellow Peak is immediately north of Paul Bunyans Cabin, a rock formation that resembles a log cabin from a distance. Lake Evangeline is northeast of the peak and Ruger Lake is to the east. The mountain was named by R. H. Sargent, topographer for the US Geological Survey in the early mapping of Glacier Park, to honor the American poet Henry Wadsworth Longfellow, (1807–1882).

== Climate ==
Based on the Köppen climate classification, Longfellow Peak is located in a subarctic climate characterized by long, usually very cold winters, and short, cool to mild summers. Temperatures can drop below −10 °F with wind chill factors below −30 °F.

== See also ==
- List of mountains and mountain ranges of Glacier National Park (U.S.)

== Gallery ==
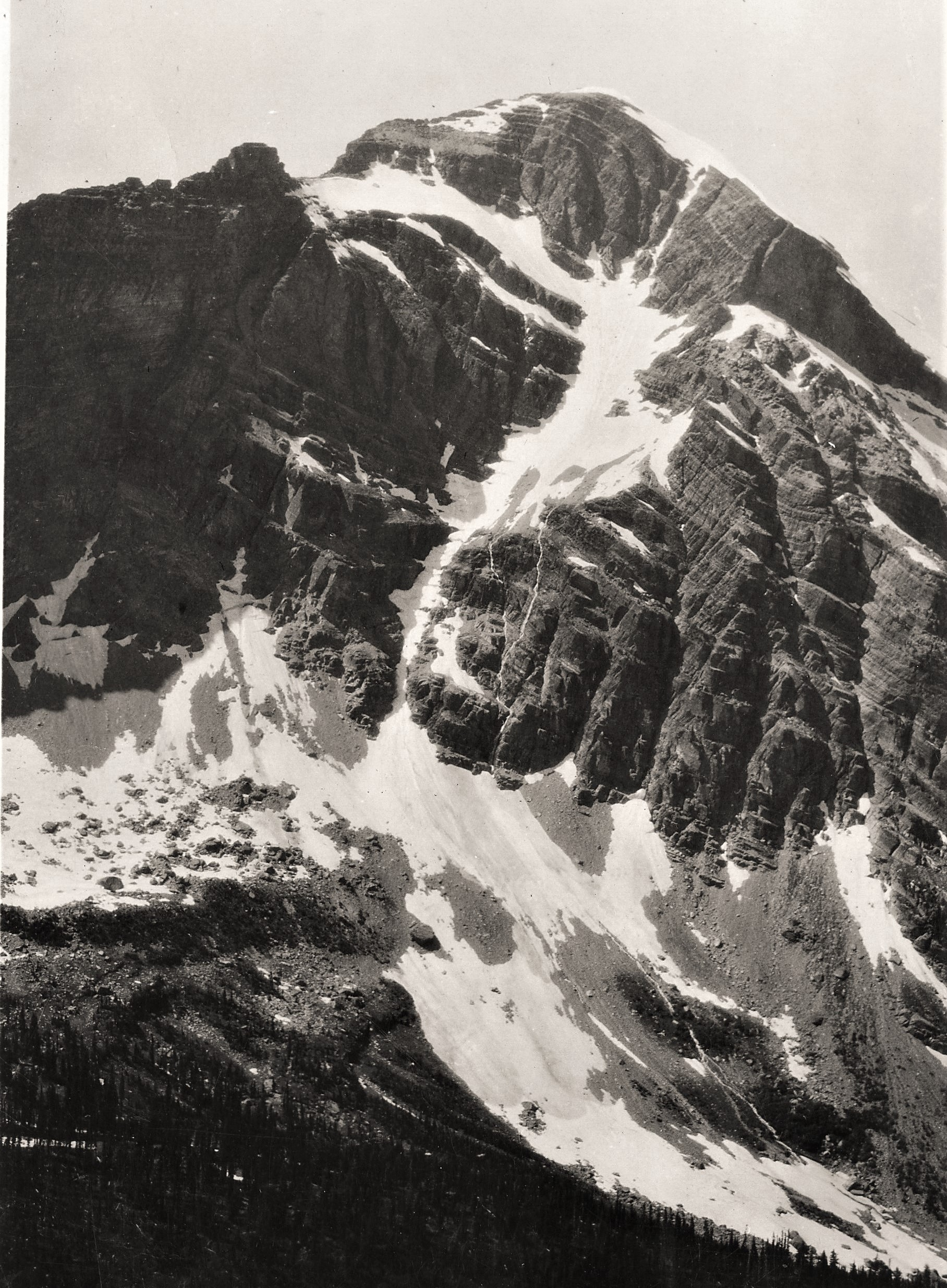
South aspect in 1913

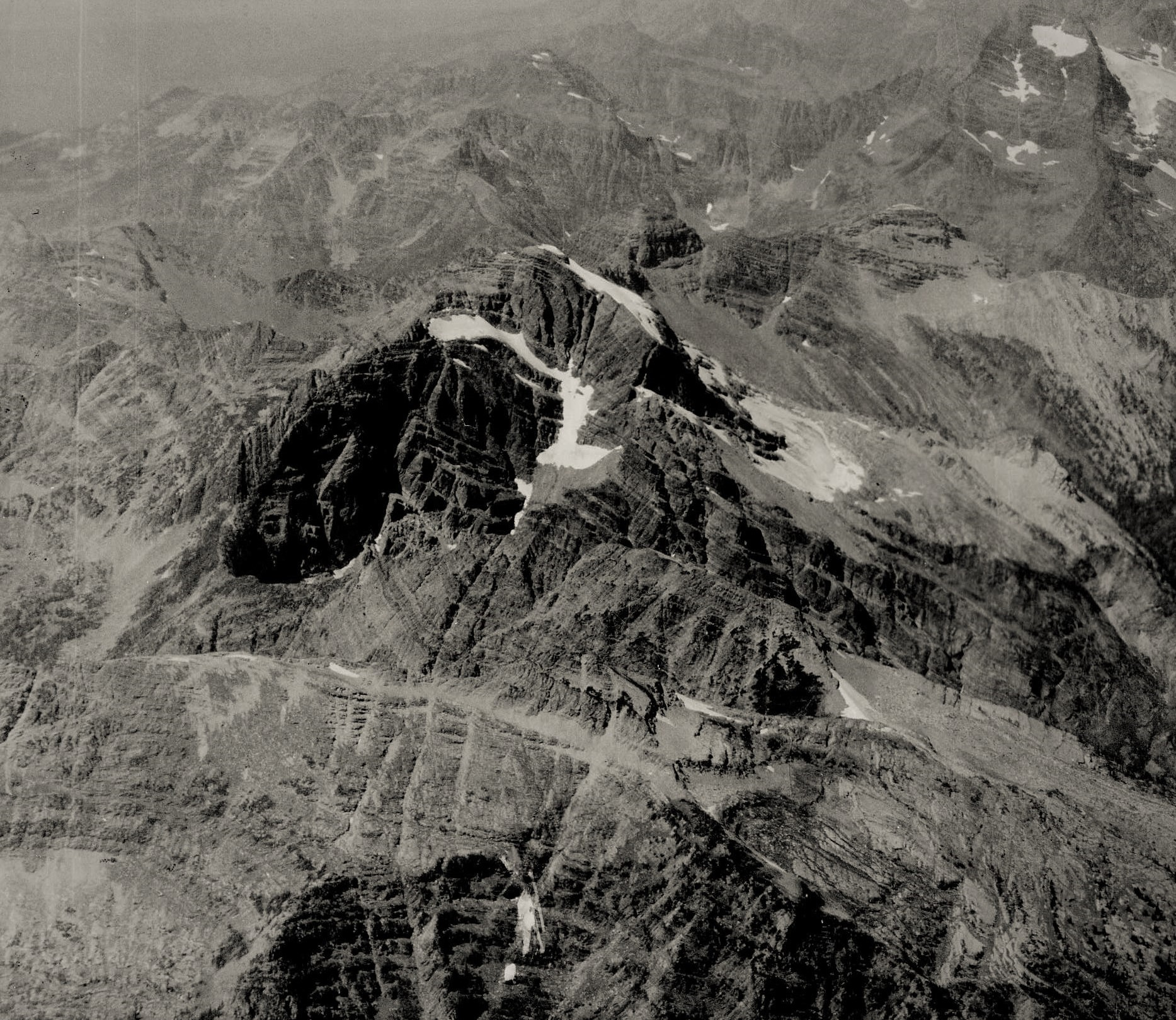
Longfellow Peak aerial of southeast aspect, circa 1925

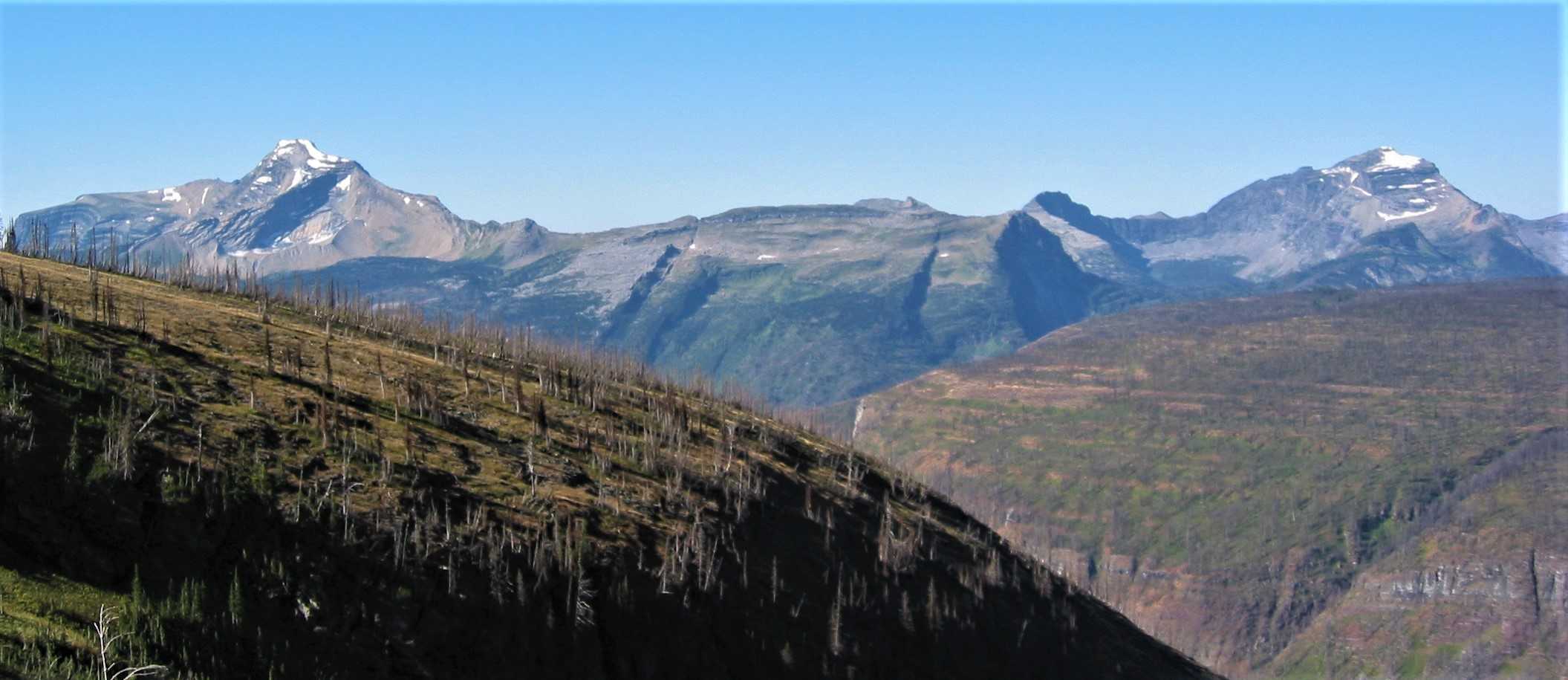
Heavens Peak (left) and Longfellow Peak (right) seen from the northeast.
