= Lincoln Lake (Flathead County, Montana) =

Lake in Glacier National Park, Montana, United States

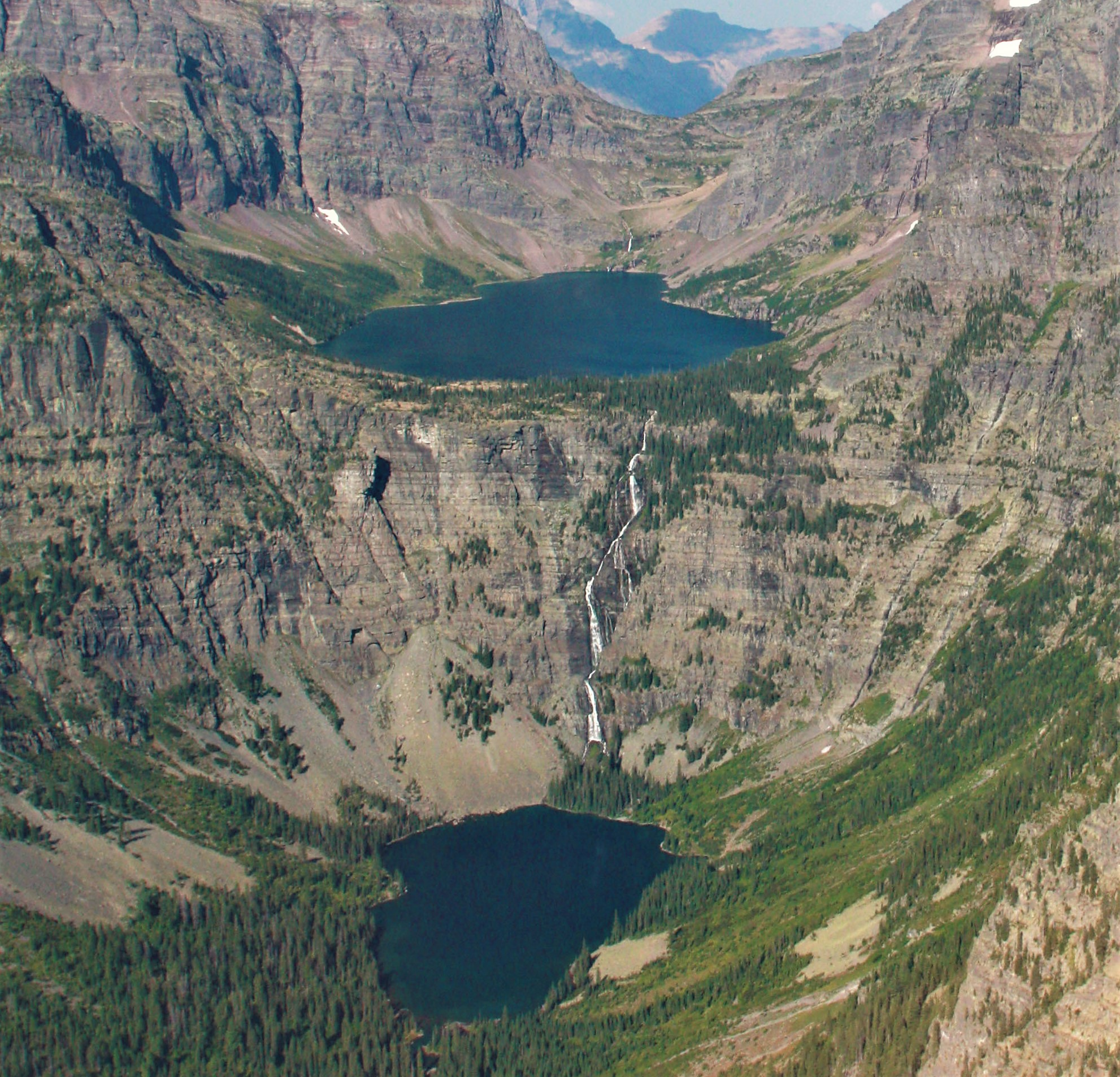
- Aerial view of Lake Ellen Wilson (top), Beaver Chief Falls, and Lincoln Lake (bottom)

- Location within Montana Location within the United States
- Location: Glacier National Park, Flathead County, Montana, US
- Coordinates: 48°35′29″N 113°46′12″W
- Type: Natural
- Primary outflows: Lincoln Creek
- Basin countries: United States
- Max. length: .50 mi (0.80 km)
- Max. width: .25 mi (0.40 km)
- Surface elevation: 4,598 ft (1,401 m)

Lincoln Lake is located in Glacier National Park, in the U. S. state of Montana. Lincoln Lake is .25 miles (0.40 km) downstream from Lake Ellen Wilson but sits more than 1,300 feet (400 m) lower in elevation. A series of cascades including Beaver Chief Falls can be found between the two lakes.

Surroundings. Mount Jackson on the right.

From the northwest

== See also ==
- List of lakes in Flathead County, Montana (A-L)
