= Lower Logging Lake Snowshoe Cabin and Boathouse =

- U.S. National Register of Historic Places
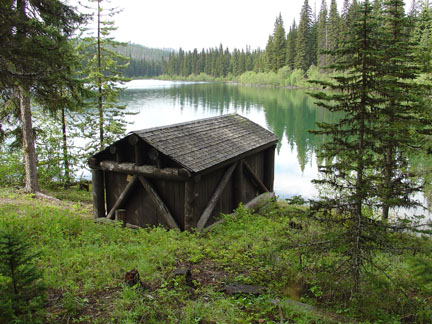
- Lower Logging Lake Boathouse

- Location within Montana Location within the United States
- Nearest city: West Glacier, Montana
- Coordinates: 48°44′26.01″N 114°7′46.45″W
- Built: 1933
- Architect: Charles Peterson
- MPS: Glacier National Park MRA
- NRHP reference No.: 86003692
- Added to NRHP: December 16, 1986

The Lower Logging Lake Snowshoe Cabin and Boathouse were built in 1933 in Glacier National Park near the southwestern end of Logging Lake. The National Park Service Rustic boathouse stores rangers' canoes for patrolling the lake and their journeys between Upper and Lower Logging Lake patrol cabins. The Lower Logging Lake snowshoe cabin is nearby. They are a significant resources both architecturally and historically, constructed for backcountry patrols.

The Lower Logging Lake cabin was built by Austin Weikert, Ace Powell and Asa Peckfrom a standard Park Service plan G-931, designed by landscape architect Charles E. Peterson.

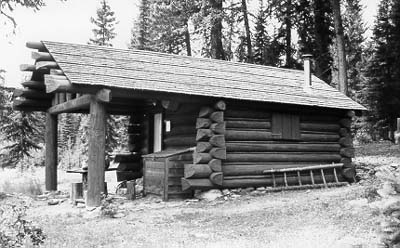
Lower Logging Lake Snowshoe Cabin

== See also ==
- Swanson Boathouse: another boathouse on the NRHP in Glacier National Park
