= Gyrfalcon Lake =

Lake in Flathead County, Montana, United States

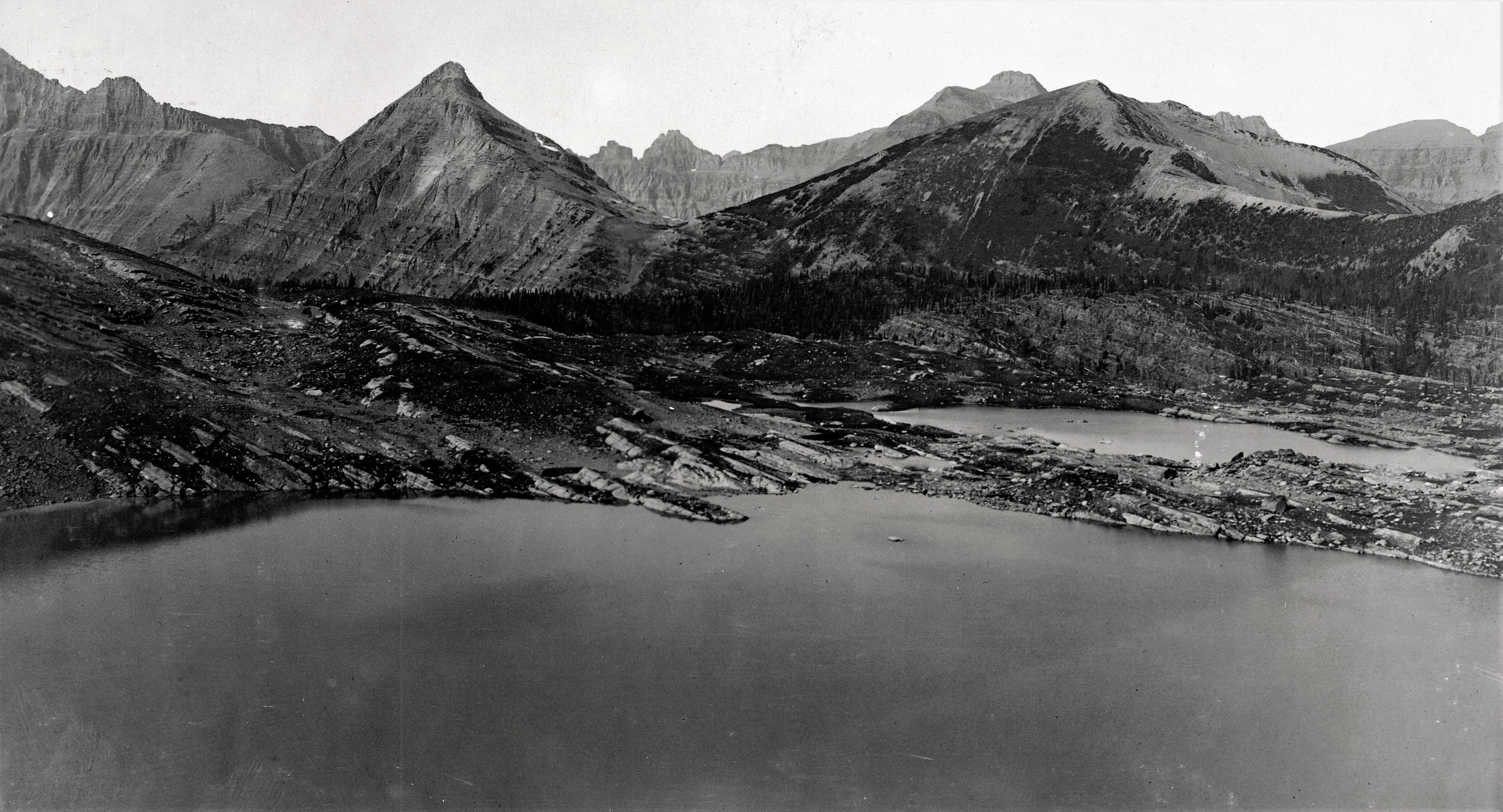
- Gyrfalcon Lake, 1913

- Location within Montana Location within the United States
- Location: Glacier National Park, Flathead County, Montana, US
- Coordinates: 48°50′16″N 114°00′15″W
- Lake type: Natural
- Primary outflows: Quartz Creek
- Basin countries: United States
- Max. length: .22 mi (0.35 km)
- Max. width: .15 mi (0.24 km)
- Surface elevation: 7,264 ft (2,214 m)

Gyrfalcon Lake is located in Glacier National Park, in the U. S. state of Montana. Gyrfalcon Lake is east of Two Ocean Glacier.

== See also ==
- List of lakes in Flathead County, Montana (A-L)
