= Beaver Chief Falls =

Waterfall located in Glacier National Park, Montana, United States

- Location within Montana
- Location: Glacier National Park (U.S.), Montana, U.S.
- Coordinates: 48°35′38″N 113°45′52″W
- Type: Cascade/Fall
- Total height: 1,291 ft (393 m)
- Number of drops: 3
- Longest drop: 517 m (1,696 ft)

Beaver Chief Falls is a waterfall located in Glacier National Park, Montana, US. The falls emerge at the top of a hanging valley just beyond the outflow for Lake Ellen Wilson and descend in a series of braided drops a distance of nearly 1,300 feet (400 m), the tallest of which is recorded as being a straight drop of 517 ft (158 m). Below the hanging valley lies Lincoln Lake, where the cascades end. Somewhat inaccessible, the falls require a nearly 20-mile (32 km) round-trip hike to visit.

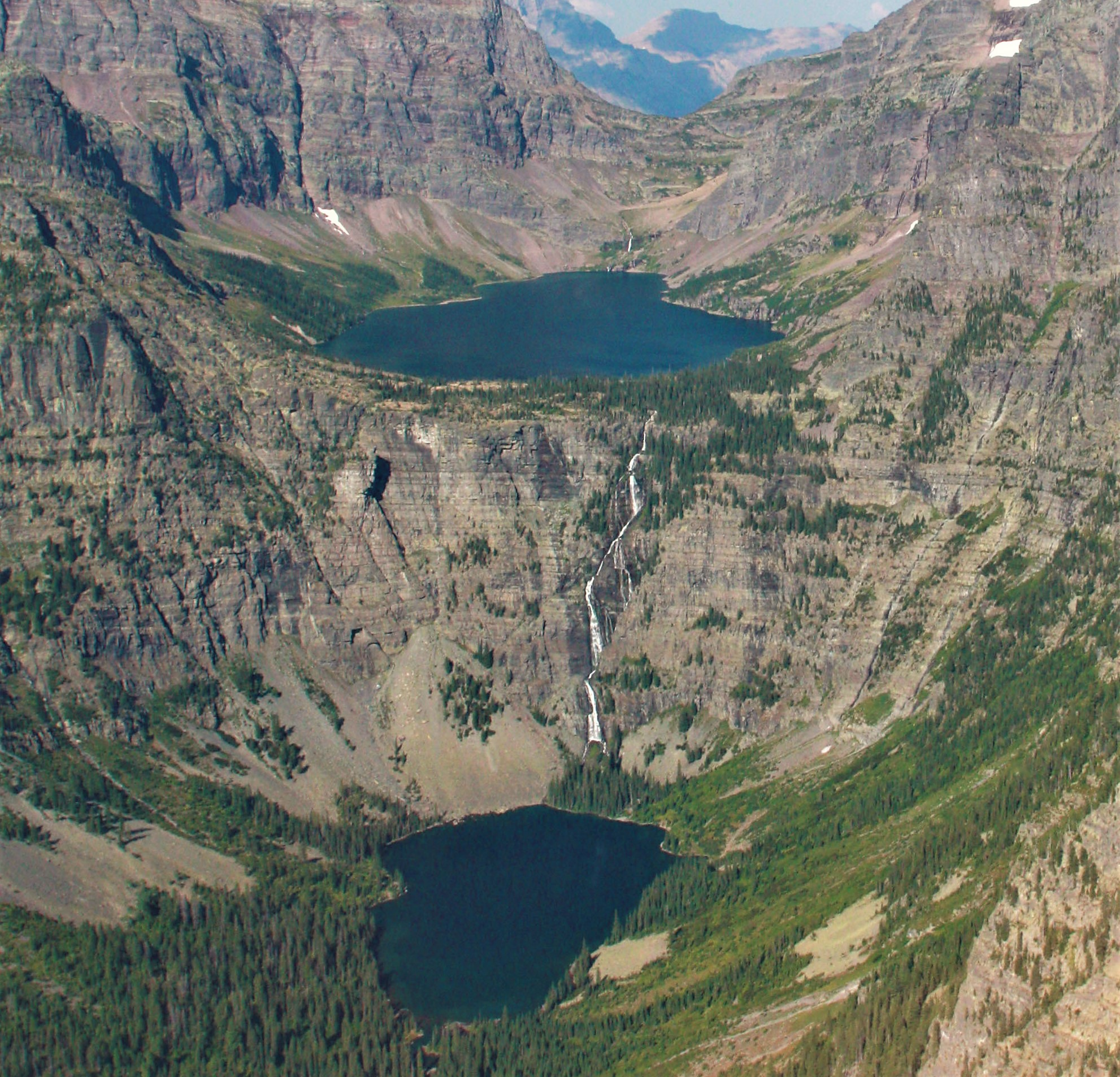
Aerial view of Lake Ellen Wilson (top), Beaver Chief Falls, and Lincoln Lake (bottom)
