= Paul Bunyans Cabin =

- Location within Montana Location within the United States

Highest point
- Elevation: 8,490 ft (2,590 m) NAVD 88
- Prominence: 50 ft (15 m)
- Coordinates: 48°44′28″N 113°56′12″W

Geography
- Location: Flathead County, Montana, U.S.
- Parent range: Livingston Range
- Topo map(s): USGS Camas Ridge East, MT

Paul Bunyans Cabin (8,490 feet (2,588 m)) is located in the Livingston Range, Glacier National Park in the U.S. state of Montana. Paul Bunyans Cabin is on a rock spur immediately SSE of Longfellow Peak and from certain angles appears as a Log cabin. Lake Evangeline is northeast of the peak and Ruger Lake is to the east.

== See also ==
- Mountains and mountain ranges of Glacier National Park (U.S.)
