= List of lakes of Flathead County, Montana (A–L) =

There are at least 269 named lakes and reservoirs in Flathead County, Montana.

== Lakes ==
- Abbot Lake, 48°07′05″N 114°03′08″W, el. 3,012 feet (918 m)
- Aeneas Lake, 48°08′23″N 113°54′28″W, el. 5,994 feet (1,827 m)
- Akaiyan Lake, 48°37′11″N 113°46′32″W, el. 7,736 feet (2,358 m)
- Akokala Lake, 48°52′46″N 114°11′52″W, el. 4,741 feet (1,445 m)
- Alcove Lake, 47°47′08″N 113°36′36″W, el. 6,985 feet (2,129 m)
- Almeda Lake, 48°15′19″N 113°42′17″W, el. 6,184 feet (1,885 m)
- Alpha Lake, 48°19′15″N 114°02′41″W, el. 5,938 feet (1,810 m)
- Amy Lake, 48°11′26″N 114°05′33″W, el. 2,982 feet (909 m)
- Angel Lake, 48°09′30″N 114°03′30″W, el. 2,982 feet (909 m)
- Angels Lake, 48°09′30″N 114°03′28″W, el. 2,982 feet (909 m)
- Ann Lake, 48°11′32″N 114°05′28″W, el. 2,976 feet (907 m)
- Arrow Lake, 48°42′24″N 113°53′06″W, el. 4,075 feet (1,242 m)
- Ashley Lake, 48°12′16″N 114°36′59″W, el. 3,950 feet (1,200 m)
- Aurice Lake, 48°26′33″N 113°27′35″W, el. 7,329 feet (2,234 m)
- Avalanche Lake, 48°39′23″N 113°47′08″W, el. 3,911 feet (1,192 m)
- Bailey Lake, 48°28′16″N 114°07′55″W, el. 3,261 feet (994 m)
- Baney Lake, 48°19′45″N 114°26′22″W, el. 3,058 feet (932 m)
- Basham Lake, 48°07′50″N 114°04′42″W, el. 2,979 feet (908 m)
- Beaver Lake, 48°08′06″N 113°03′59″W, el. 5,899 feet (1,798 m)
- Beaver Lake, 48°26′04″N 114°25′07″W, el. 3,264 feet (995 m)
- Beaver Woman Lake, 48°29′09″N 113°34′40″W, el. 5,876 feet (1,791 m)
- Beta Lake, 48°19′03″N 114°01′45″W, el. 5,581 feet (1,701 m)
- Big Hawk Lake, 48°05′52″N 113°51′32″W, el. 6,001 feet (1,829 m)
- Big Salmon Lake, 47°36′13″N 113°22′57″W, el. 4,314 feet (1,315 m)
- Birch Lake, 48°08′24″N 113°54′48″W, el. 6,194 feet (1,888 m)
- Black Lake, 48°09′42″N 113°55′12″W, el. 6,063 feet (1,848 m)
- Blackfoot Lake, 48°10′58″N 113°55′21″W, el. 5,538 feet (1,688 m)
- Blanchard Lake, 48°23′03″N 114°21′56″W, el. 3,146 feet (959 m)
- Blue Lake, 48°08′22″N 114°03′44″W, el. 2,979 feet (908 m)
- Blue Lake, 48°39′29″N 114°46′00″W, el. 3,258 feet (993 m)
- Blue Lakes, 47°55′15″N 113°16′52″W, el. 4,436 feet (1,352 m)
- Bootjack Lake, 48°25′24″N 114°29′35″W, el. 3,081 feet (939 m)
- Bowman Lake, 48°52′00″N 114°09′52″W, el. 4,035 feet (1,230 m)
- Bowser Lake, 48°18′32″N 114°27′09″W, el. 3,179 feet (969 m)
- Boyle Lake (Montana), 48°28′10″N 114°27′11″W, el. 3,087 feet (941 m)
- Boys Lake, 48°09′22″N 114°03′26″W, el. 3,002 feet (915 m)
- Bradley Lake, 48°05′08″N 113°23′06″W, el. 5,413 feet (1,650 m)
- Buffalo Woman Lake, 48°28′29″N 113°35′11″W, el. 6,096 feet (1,858 m)
- Bunker Lake, 47°52′21″N 113°39′20″W, el. 6,302 feet (1,921 m)
- Burnt Lake, 48°37′23″N 114°43′00″W, el. 3,674 feet (1,120 m)
- Cabin Lake, 48°09′32″N 114°04′32″W, el. 2,979 feet (908 m)
- Camas Lake, 48°44′24″N 113°53′02″W, el. 5,082 feet (1,549 m)
- Castle Lake, 48°07′19″N 113°24′41″W, el. 5,184 feet (1,580 m)
- Cat Lake, 47°37′32″N 113°39′57″W, el. 6,706 feet (2,044 m)
- Cedar Lake, 48°25′50″N 114°11′26″W, el. 3,399 feet (1,036 m)
- Cerulean Lake, 48°52′20″N 114°03′27″W, el. 4,665 feet (1,422 m)
- Chain Lakes, 48°46′34″N 114°34′08″W, el. 5,991 feet (1,826 m)
- Chinook Lake, 48°25′58″N 114°31′44″W, el. 3,638 feet (1,109 m)
- Christopher Lake, 47°46′59″N 113°08′18″W, el. 7,149 feet (2,179 m)
- Circle Lake, 48°09′12″N 114°04′29″W, el. 2,979 feet (908 m)
- Clayton Lake, 48°11′38″N 113°53′39″W, el. 5,945 feet (1,812 m)
- Cliff Lake, 48°09′46″N 113°53′26″W, el. 5,584 feet (1,702 m)
- Cliff Lake, 48°20′20″N 114°26′45″W, el. 3,035 feet (925 m)
- Cougar Lake, 48°09′15″N 114°03′43″W, el. 2,995 feet (913 m)
- Crater Lake, 48°07′02″N 113°53′59″W, el. 5,774 feet (1,760 m)
- Cree Lake, 48°11′46″N 114°05′41″W, el. 2,979 feet (908 m)
- Crevice Lake, 47°52′48″N 113°39′52″W, el. 6,913 feet (2,107 m)
- Cup Lake, 48°08′09″N 113°37′42″W, el. 6,345 feet (1,934 m)
- Cyclone Lake (Montana), 48°42′21″N 114°18′05″W, el. 4,108 feet (1,252 m)
- Dahl Lake, 48°10′02″N 114°49′44″W, el. 3,514 feet (1,071 m)
- Dan Lake, 48°11′06″N 114°05′59″W, el. 2,982 feet (909 m)
- Dean Lake, 47°55′25″N 113°06′28″W, el. 7,365 feet (2,245 m)
- Diamond Lake, 47°37′59″N 113°09′14″W, el. 7,434 feet (2,266 m)
- Dickey Lake, 48°17′01″N 113°43′02″W, el. 6,033 feet (1,839 m)
- Dog Lake, 48°34′57″N 114°36′33″W, el. 3,228 feet (984 m)
- Dollar Lake, 48°26′49″N 114°24′51″W, el. 3,448 feet (1,051 m)
- Doris Lakes, 48°18′36″N 114°04′26″W, el. 6,493 feet (1,979 m)
- Double Lake, 48°10′39″N 114°05′28″W, el. 2,979 feet (908 m)
- Dry Lake, 48°09′32″N 114°05′00″W, el. 2,969 feet (905 m)
- Duck Lake, 48°37′14″N 114°40′37″W, el. 3,209 feet (978 m)
- Dutch Lakes, 48°43′40″N 113°56′49″W, el. 6,762 feet (2,061 m)
- East Bass Lake, 48°10′51″N 114°05′17″W, el. 2,972 feet (906 m)
- Echo Lake, 48°07′33″N 114°02′31″W, el. 3,012 feet (918 m)
- Elelehum Lake, 48°37′55″N 114°17′13″W, el. 4,377 feet (1,334 m)
- Elk Lake, 48°11′44″N 113°28′43″W, el. 6,322 feet (1,927 m)
- Fawn Lake, 48°19′06″N 114°04′37″W, el. 6,473 feet (1,973 m)
- Feather Woman Lake, 48°37′05″N 113°46′38″W, el. 7,546 feet (2,300 m)
- Finger Lake, 48°36′45″N 114°41′06″W, el. 3,278 feet (999 m)
- Fire Lakes, 48°37′24″N 114°43′35″W, el. 3,671 feet (1,119 m)
- Fish Lake, 48°27′13″N 114°30′30″W, el. 3,045 feet (928 m)
- Fish Lake, 48°36′02″N 113°51′35″W, el. 4,153 feet (1,266 m)
- Flathead Lake, 47°53′15″N 114°07′03″W, el. 2,897 feet (883 m)
- Flotilla Lake, 48°03′58″N 113°22′35″W, el. 5,220 feet (1,590 m)
- Foy Lake, 48°09′57″N 114°21′36″W, el. 3,304 feet (1,007 m)
- Frozen Lake, 48°59′58″N 114°40′46″W, el. 4,888 feet (1,490 m)
- Garlick Lake, 48°10′36″N 114°05′15″W, el. 2,979 feet (908 m)
- Garnet Lake (Montana), 48°57′24″N 114°27′06″W, el. 4,108 feet (1,252 m)
- Gem Lake, 48°37′19″N 113°46′26″W, el. 7,982 feet (2,433 m)
- Giefer Lake, 48°12′51″N 113°26′08″W, el. 6,719 feet (2,048 m)
- Gilbert Lake (Montana), 48°11′33″N 114°05′52″W, el. 2,979 feet (908 m)
- Gildart Lakes, 47°50′10″N 113°39′57″W, el. 7,149 feet (2,179 m)
- Grace Lake, 48°47′30″N 114°00′04″W, el. 3,966 feet (1,209 m)
- Grayling Lake Number One, 48°09′01″N 114°04′03″W, el. 2,989 feet (911 m)
- Grayling Lake Number Two, 48°09′34″N 114°04′19″W, el. 2,969 feet (905 m)
- Gunsight Lake, 47°58′40″N 113°20′22″W, el. 6,430 feet (1,960 m)
- Gyrfalcon Lake, 48°50′16″N 114°00′15″W, el. 7,264 feet (2,214 m)
- Halfmoon Lake, 48°27′51″N 113°47′19″W, el. 3,983 feet (1,214 m)
- Halfmoon Lake, 48°28′17″N 114°00′09″W, el. 3,268 feet (996 m)
- Handkerchief Lake, 48°08′31″N 113°49′35″W, el. 3,839 feet (1,170 m)
- Hanson Lake, 48°20′53″N 114°27′59″W, el. 3,094 feet (943 m)
- Hanson-Doyle Lake, 48°21′31″N 114°28′01″W, el. 3,100 feet (940 m)
- Harbin Lake, 48°11′53″N 114°05′30″W, el. 2,969 feet (905 m)
- Harrison Lake, 48°31′09″N 113°46′04″W, el. 3,697 feet (1,127 m)
- Hart Lake, 47°52′08″N 113°06′05″W, el. 5,712 feet (1,741 m)
- Hawks Lake, 48°21′34″N 114°27′47″W, el. 3,100 feet (940 m)
- Hay Lake, 48°43′32″N 114°32′19″W, el. 5,722 feet (1,744 m)
- Hidden Lake, 48°40′35″N 113°44′29″W, el. 6,378 feet (1,944 m)
- Hidden Lakes, 48°00′14″N 114°42′59″W, el. 3,625 feet (1,105 m)
- Hole in the Wall Lake, 48°36′25″N 114°40′49″W, el. 3,353 feet (1,022 m)
- Howe Lake, 48°36′24″N 113°59′16″W, el. 4,111 feet (1,253 m)
- Hungry Horse Lake, 48°20′19″N 113°57′50″W, el. 3,592 feet (1,095 m)
- Huntsberger Lake, 48°48′30″N 114°40′11″W, el. 6,345 feet (1,934 m)
- Inspiration Lakes, 47°46′04″N 113°38′31″W, el. 6,683 feet (2,037 m)
- In-thlam-keh Lake, 48°07′48″N 113°54′33″W, el. 6,033 feet (1,839 m)
- Jackstraw Lake, 48°24′41″N 113°21′46″W, el. 6,138 feet (1,871 m)
- Jenny Lake, 48°16′39″N 114°05′03″W, el. 6,552 feet (1,997 m)
- John Lake, 48°11′50″N 114°05′46″W, el. 2,979 feet (908 m)
- Johns Lake, 48°38′16″N 113°51′20″W, el. 3,346 feet (1,020 m)
- Johnson Lake, 48°06′00″N 114°03′54″W, el. 3,015 feet (919 m)
- Kathy Lake, 48°11′22″N 114°05′38″W, el. 2,979 feet (908 m)
- Kaufmans Lake, 48°12′37″N 114°05′47″W, el. 2,972 feet (906 m)
- Kid Lake, 48°11′41″N 114°05′31″W, el. 2,972 feet (906 m)
- Kintla Lake, 48°57′53″N 114°18′10″W, el. 4,012 feet (1,223 m)
- Kohler Lake, 48°09′18″N 114°05′21″W, el. 2,972 feet (906 m)
- Lagoni Lake, 48°35′22″N 114°39′16″W, el. 3,202 feet (976 m)
- Lake Blaine, 48°14′44″N 114°07′09″W, el. 2,995 feet (913 m)
- Lake Douglas, 48°11′10″N 114°05′36″W, el. 2,979 feet (908 m)
- Lake Ellen Wilson, 48°36′02″N 113°45′20″W, el. 5,932 feet (1,808 m)
- Lake Evangeline, 48°45′01″N 113°54′45″W, el. 5,253 feet (1,601 m)
- Lake Five, 48°27′55″N 114°01′11″W, el. 3,261 feet (994 m)
- Lake Isabel, 48°25′20″N 113°29′37″W, el. 5,718 feet (1,743 m)
- Lake McDonald, 48°34′09″N 113°56′10″W, el. 3,156 feet (962 m)
- Lake Meredith, 48°10′37″N 114°05′07″W, el. 2,972 feet (906 m)
- Lake Monroe, 48°07′43″N 114°34′22″W, el. 3,816 feet (1,163 m)
- Lake of the Woods, 48°08′42″N 114°03′14″W, el. 3,005 feet (916 m)
- Lake Peter, 48°11′05″N 114°05′48″W, el. 2,969 feet (905 m)
- Lake Rogers, 48°03′57″N 114°36′17″W, el. 3,907 feet (1,191 m)
- Lake Seven Acres, 48°09′23″N 113°53′00″W, el. 6,142 feet (1,872 m)
- Lake West, 48°26′38″N 114°01′46″W, el. 3,274 feet (998 m)
- Lamoose Lake, 48°14′10″N 114°01′29″W, el. 6,355 feet (1,937 m)
- Late Lake, 47°48′15″N 113°33′26″W, el. 6,657 feet (2,029 m)
- Lincoln Lake, 48°35′29″N 113°46′12″W, el. 4,603 feet (1,403 m)
- Link Lake, 48°45′55″N 114°34′41″W, el. 6,440 feet (1,960 m)
- Lion Lake, 48°22′17″N 114°01′54″W, el. 3,468 feet (1,057 m)
- Little Beaver Lake, 48°26′39″N 114°25′15″W, el. 3,268 feet (996 m)
- Little Bitterroot Lake, 48°06′49″N 114°42′57″W, el. 3,907 feet (1,191 m)
- Little Bootjack Lake, 48°26′05″N 114°29′45″W, el. 3,163 feet (964 m)
- Little McGregor Lake, 48°02′43″N 114°49′43″W, el. 3,944 feet (1,202 m)
- Logging Lake, 48°45′11″N 114°05′19″W, el. 3,816 feet (1,163 m)
- Lone Lake, 48°08′34″N 114°35′28″W, el. 3,848 feet (1,173 m)
- Long Bow Lake, 48°54′53″N 114°12′51″W, el. 6,896 feet (2,102 m)
- Lore Lake, 48°18′44″N 114°25′38″W, el. 3,081 feet (939 m)
- Lost Coon Lake, 48°23′48″N 114°21′33″W, el. 3,110 feet (950 m)
- Lost Lake, 48°00′10″N 114°18′19″W, el. 3,878 feet (1,182 m)
- Louis Lake, 48°37′36″N 114°48′46″W, el. 4,905 feet (1,495 m)
- Lower Foy Lake, 48°10′39″N 114°22′01″W, el. 3,133 feet (955 m)
- Lower Quartz Lake, 48°48′25″N 114°10′25″W, el. 4,196 feet (1,279 m)
- Lower Stillwater Lake, 48°31′29″N 114°33′52″W, el. 3,054 feet (931 m)
- Lupine Lake, 48°17′05″N 114°44′12″W, el. 5,105 feet (1,556 m)
- Lynch Lake, 48°11′37″N 114°59′30″W, el. 3,484 feet (1,062 m)

== Reservoirs ==
- Ashley Lake, 48°11′00″N 114°37′21″W, el. 3,950 feet (1,200 m)
- Hubbart Reservoir, 47°55′43″N 114°43′57″W, el. 3,451 feet (1,052 m)
- Hungry Horse Reservoir, 48°20′31″N 114°00′45″W, el. 3,451 feet (1,052 m)
- Jessup Mill Pond, 48°11′56″N 114°06′32″W, el. 2,940 feet (900 m)
- Lion Lake, 48°22′06″N 114°01′51″W, el. 3,494 feet (1,065 m)
- Lion Lake, 48°22′18″N 114°02′09″W, el. 3,474 feet (1,059 m)
- Little Bitterroot Lake, 48°05′36″N 114°41′51″W, el. 3,907 feet (1,191 m)

== See also ==
- List of lakes in Montana
- List of lakes in Flathead County, Montana (M-Z)
