= Akaiyan Lake =

Lake in Flathead County, Montana, United States

- Location within Montana Location within the United States
- Location: Glacier National Park, Flathead County, Montana, US
- Coordinates: 48°37′11″N 113°46′32″W
- Type: Natural
- Basin countries: United States
- Max. length: .15 mi (0.24 km)
- Max. width: .05 mi (0.080 km)
- Surface elevation: 7,736 ft (2,358 m)

Akaiyan Lake is located in Glacier National Park, in the U. S. state of Montana. The lake is often ice-clogged and is .75 miles (1.21 km) WSW of Sperry Glacier.

== See also ==
- List of lakes in Flathead County, Montana (A-L)
