= Quartz Lake Patrol Cabin =

- U.S. National Register of Historic Places
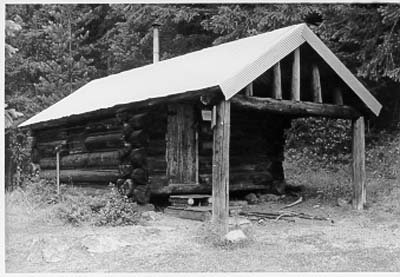

- Location within Montana Location within the United States
- Nearest city: West Glacier, Montana
- Coordinates: 48°49′19″N 114°8′5″W
- Built: 1930
- Architect: Austin Weikert
- MPS: Glacier National Park MRA
- NRHP reference No.: 86000361
- Added to NRHP: February 14, 1986

The Quartz Lake Patrol Cabin in Glacier National Park is a significant resource both architecturally and historically as shelters, one-day's travel (8–12 miles) apart, for rangers patrolling the backcountry. The National Park Service Rustic log cabin was built in 1930 by local builder Austin Weikert, using National Park Service standard plan G913. The cabin is adjacent to the western shore of Quartz Lake.
