= Feather Woman Lake =

Lake in Flathead County, Montana, United States

- Location within Montana Location within the United States
- Location: Glacier National Park, Flathead County, Montana, US
- Coordinates: 48°37′05″N 113°46′38″W
- Lake type: Natural
- Primary outflows: Sprague Creek
- Basin countries: United States
- Max. length: .20 mi (0.32 km)
- Max. width: .10 mi (0.16 km)
- Surface elevation: 7,538 ft (2,298 m)

Feather Woman Lake is located in Glacier National Park, in the U. S. state of Montana. The lake is often ice clogged and is 1 mile (1.6 km) WSW of Sperry Glacier.

== See also ==
- List of lakes in Flathead County, Montana (A-L)
