= Gem Lake (Flathead County, Montana) =

Lake in Montana, United States

- Location within Montana Location within the United States
- Location: Glacier National Park, Flathead County, Montana, US
- Coordinates: 48°37′19″N 113°46′26″W
- Lake type: Natural
- Basin countries: United States
- Max. length: .03 mi (0.048 km)
- Max. width: .03 mi (0.048 km)
- Surface elevation: 7,982 ft (2,433 m)

Gem Lake is located in Glacier National Park, in the U. S. state of Montana. Gem Lake is often ice clogged and is .50 miles (0.80 km) WSW of Sperry Glacier and adjacent to Comeau Pass.

== See also ==
- List of lakes in Flathead County, Montana (A-L)
