= Little Bitterroot Lake =

- Location within Montana Location within the United States
- Location: Flathead County, Montana
- Coordinates: 48°06′52″N 114°42′56″W
- Type: lake
- Basin countries: United States
- Surface elevation: 3,907 ft (1,191 m)

Little Bitterroot Lake is a small lake in northwest Montana. It is located in the town of Marion, Montana. The lake is in the Salish Mountains.

== See also ==
- List of lakes in Flathead County, Montana (A-L)
