= Bearhead Mountain (Montana) =

Mountain in the state of Montana

- Location within Montana Location within the United States

Highest point
- Elevation: 8,406 ft (2,562 m)
- Prominence: 881 ft (269 m)
- Coordinates: 48°25′27″N 113°21′21″W

Geography
- Location: Flathead County, Montana, Glacier County, Montana, U.S.
- Parent range: Lewis Range
- Topo map: USGS Dancing Lady Mountain

Climbing
- First ascent: Unknown
- Easiest route: class 3/4

Bearhead Mountain (8,406 feet (2,562 m)) is located in the Lewis Range, Glacier National Park in the U.S. state of Montana. The mountain is named for kyáiyótokan, a Piegan warrior known for his war against the dreaded Assiniboine White Dog. kyáiyótokan was also a survivor of the Marias Massacre and the brother of Chief Heavy Runner a confidant of Glacier author James Willard Schultz.

== See also ==
- Mountains and mountain ranges of Glacier National Park (U.S.)
