= Shields Creek =

Natural stream in Montana, United States

Coordinates: 48°15′26″N 113°27′44″W

Shields Creek is a stream in the U.S. state of Montana. It is a tributary to Bear Creek.

Shields Creek was named after Thomas Shields, a railroad agent.
