= Lake Evangeline =

Lake in the American state of Montana

- Location within Montana Location within the United States
- Location: Glacier National Park, Flathead County, Montana, US
- Coordinates: 48°44′56″N 113°54′59″W
- Type: Natural
- Primary inflows: Camas Creek
- Primary outflows: Camas Creek
- Basin countries: United States
- Max. length: .60 mi (0.97 km)
- Max. width: .35 mi (0.56 km)
- Surface elevation: 5,247 ft (1,599 m)

Lake Evangeline is located in Glacier National Park, in the U. S. state of Montana. Lake Evangeline is situated in the Upper Camas Valley, and is 1.25 miles (2.01 km) northwest of Camas Lake. Nearby mountains include Longfellow Peak and Paul Bunyans Cabin to the southwest. Lake Evangeline is named for Longfellow's poem, Evangeline, his most famous work in his lifetime.

== See also ==
- List of lakes in Flathead County, Montana (A-L)
