= Quartz Lake =

Lake in Glacier National Park in Montana

- Quartz Lake as seen from the west end. Looking east. Vulture Peak in the center.

- Location within Montana Location within the United States
- Location: Glacier National Park, Flathead County, Montana, US
- Coordinates: 48°49′31″N 114°06′18″W
- Type: Natural
- Primary inflows: Quartz Creek
- Primary outflows: Quartz Creek
- Basin countries: United States
- Max. length: 4 mi (6.4 km)
- Max. width: .50 mi (0.80 km)
- Surface elevation: 4,416 ft (1,346 m)

Quartz Lake is located in Glacier National Park, in the U. S. state of Montana. Quartz Lake is only 150 yards (140 m) east of Middle Quartz Lake. Quartz Lake is a 6 miles (9.7 km) hike from the Bowman Lake Picnic Area. The historic Quartz Lake Patrol Cabin is on the western shore of Quartz Lake.

== See also ==
- List of lakes in Flathead County, Montana (M-Z)
