= Dancing Lady Mountain =

Mountain in Montana, United States

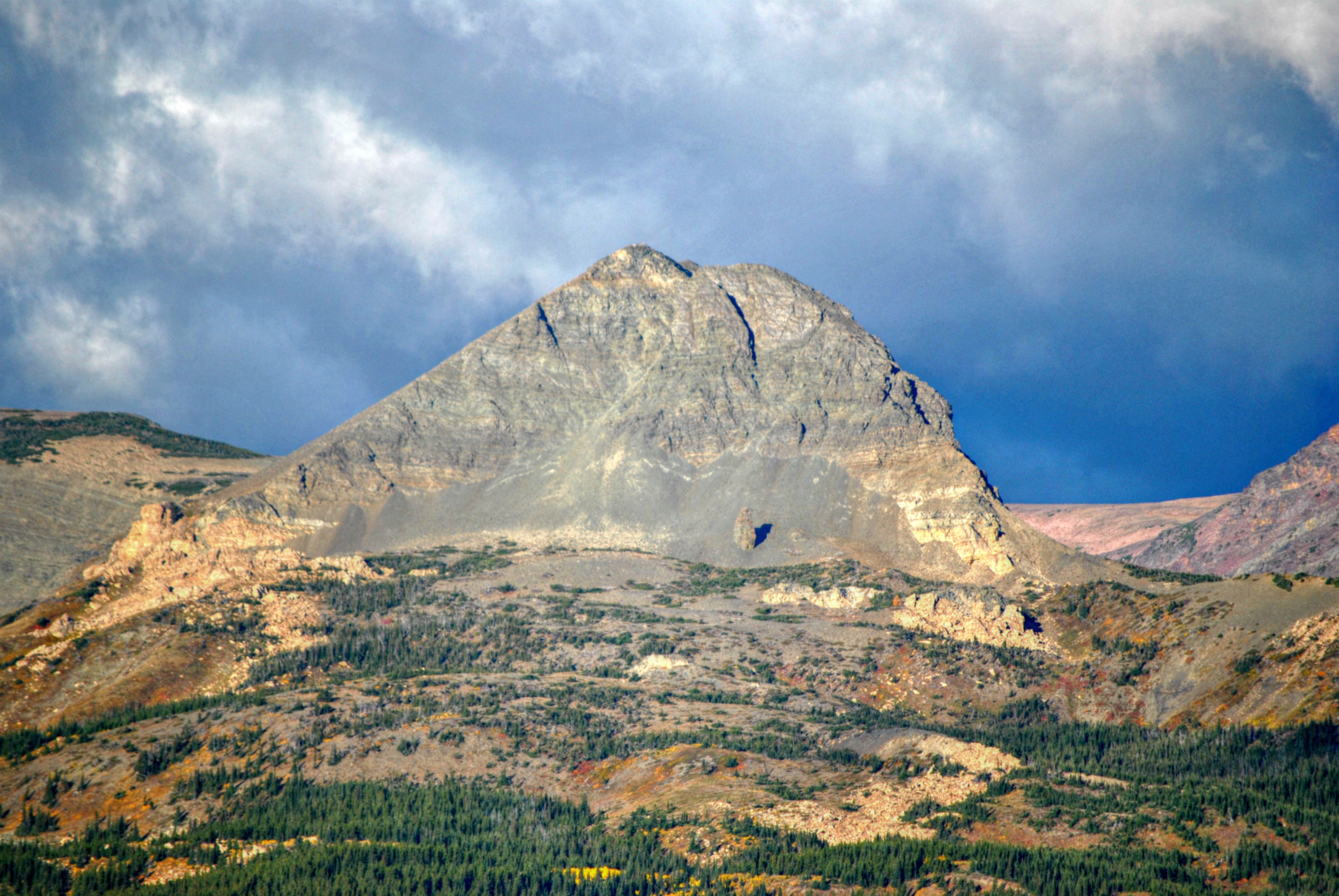
- East face

Highest point
- Elevation: 7,357 ft (2,242 m)
- Prominence: 233 ft (71 m)
- Coordinates: 48°25′28″N 113°18′42″W

Geography
- Location within Montana
- Location: Glacier County, Montana, U.S.
- Parent range: Lewis Range
- Topo map: USGS Dancing Lady Mountain MT

Climbing
- First ascent: Unknown
- Easiest route: Scramble class III

Dancing Lady Mountain is a summit in Glacier County, Montana, in the United States and it is located within Glacier National Park. Dancing Lady is derived from a Blackfoot-language name. The mountain's former name of Squaw Mountain was changed due to ongoing controversy over the term "squaw".

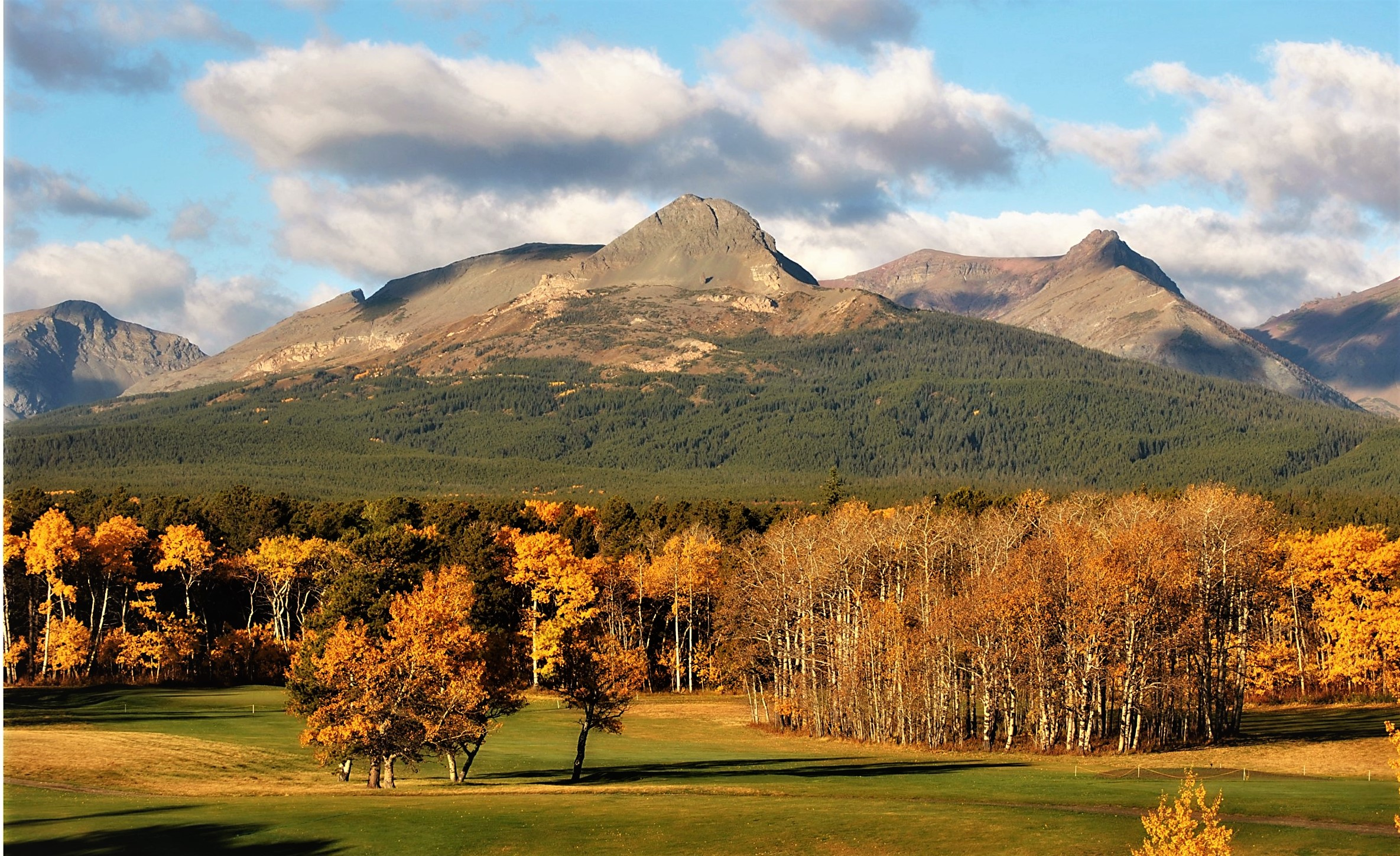
Dancing Lady Mountain in autumn

== See also ==
- Mountains and mountain ranges of Glacier National Park (U.S.)
