= Lake Five (Montana) =

Private lake in Montana, United States

- Interactive map of Lake Five
- Location: Flathead County, Montana, United States
- Coordinates: 48°29′N 113°59′W
- Type: Freshwater lake
- Max. length: 60.2 ft (18.3 m)
- Surface area: 151.8 acres (61.4 ha)
- Surface elevation: 3,257.04 ft (992.75 m)

Lake Five is a freshwater lake in Flathead County, Montana, near the western entrance to Glacier National Park.

== Description ==
The lake is 60.2 feet (18.3 m) and covers an area of 151.8 acres and is at an elevation of 3,257.04 ft (992.75 m). The lake is surrounded by approximately thirty residential properties.

The lake is stocked with kokanee salmon and rainbow trout by the Montana Department of Fish, Wildlife and Parks. In addition, Perch and Bluegill are popular.

== Controversy ==
A group that called themselves "Friends of Lake Five" sued the county of Flathead after a resort owner was granted a land use permit to develop land at Lake Five. The developer of the land began construction on "Whistlestop Retreat" before they were granted a permit. The developer eventually got the permit to develop from Flathead, but the lawsuit was won by the Friend's of Lake Five. The presiding judge granted a permanent injunction and ruled that the land had to be restored to condition at purchase. Many structures had to be demolished.
