= Logging Lake =

Lake in Montana, United States

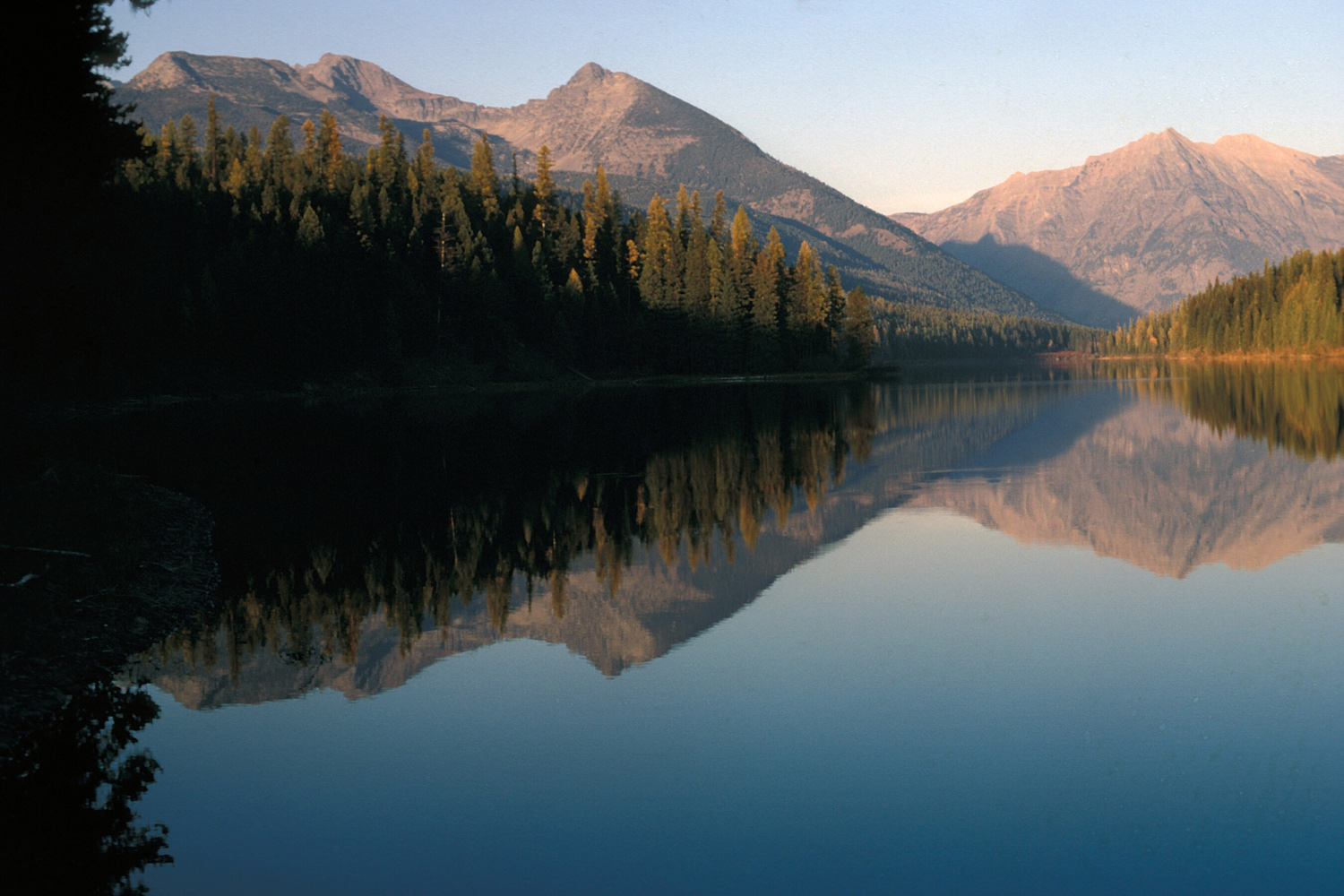
- Logging Lake

- Location within Montana Location within the United States
- Location: Glacier National Park, Flathead County, Montana, US
- Coordinates: 48°45′11″N 114°05′19″W
- Type: Natural
- Primary inflows: Logging Creek
- Primary outflows: Logging Creek
- Basin countries: United States
- Max. length: 6 mi (10 km)
- Max. width: 0.40 mi (0.64 km)
- Surface elevation: 3,810 ft (1,160 m)

Logging Lake is located in Glacier National Park, in the U. S. state of Montana. Logging Lake is one of the longest lakes in Glacier National Park at 6 miles (10 km) in length. The Lower Logging Lake Snowshoe Cabin and Boathouse are two structures located near the southwestern end of Logging Lake, and are on the National Register of Historic Places. Logging Lake is a 4.5 miles (7.2 km) hike from the Logging Lake Ranger Station.

Glacier View Dam, proposed in the 1940s, would have raised the surface of Logging Lake by as much as 50 feet (15 m) while inundating lands to the west of the lake. The dam was never built.

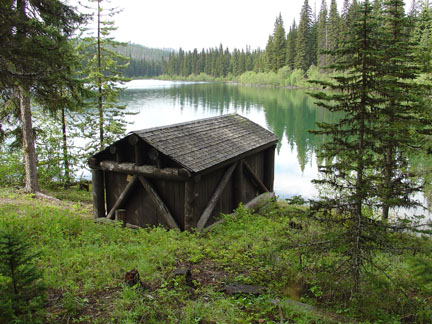
Lower Logging Lake Boathouse

== See also ==
- List of lakes in Flathead County, Montana (A-L)
