= Bowman Lake (Montana) =

Lake in Glacier National Park, U.S.

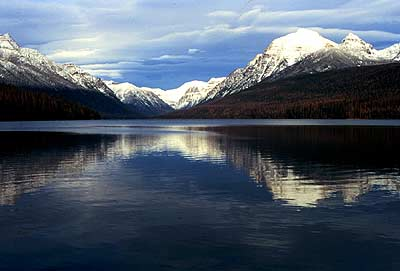

- Location within Montana Location within the United States
- Location: Glacier National Park, Flathead County, Montana, US
- Coordinates: 48°52′00″N 114°09′52″W
- Type: Natural
- Primary inflows: Various streams
- Primary outflows: Bowman Creek
- Basin countries: United States
- Max. length: 7 mi (11 km)
- Max. width: 0.5 mi (0.80 km)
- Surface area: 1,706 acres (690 ha)
- Max. depth: 253 ft (77 m)
- Surface elevation: 4,030 ft (1,230 m)

Bowman Lake is in the northwestern portion of Glacier National Park in Montana. The lake is accessed via a 6 miles (9.7 km) unpaved road from the small town of Polebridge. At 1,706 acres (690 ha), Bowman Lake is the third largest lake in the park, after Lake McDonald and Saint Mary Lake.

The campground is located close to the shore, and the trees along the site provide privacy. Day users have access to the picnic ground, and there are several hiking trails within the area. Fishing, canoeing, and kayaking are also popular on the lake which is of a glacially cold temperature. Motorized boats of 10 horsepower (7 kW) or less are allowed on the lake. Because of the long, bumpy road, recreational vehicles and truck/trailer combinations are not recommended.

== See also ==
- List of lakes in Flathead County, Montana (A-L)
- Bowman Lake Patrol Cabin
- Skyland Camp-Bowman Lake Ranger Station
