= Vance Lodge =

- U.S. National Register of Historic Places
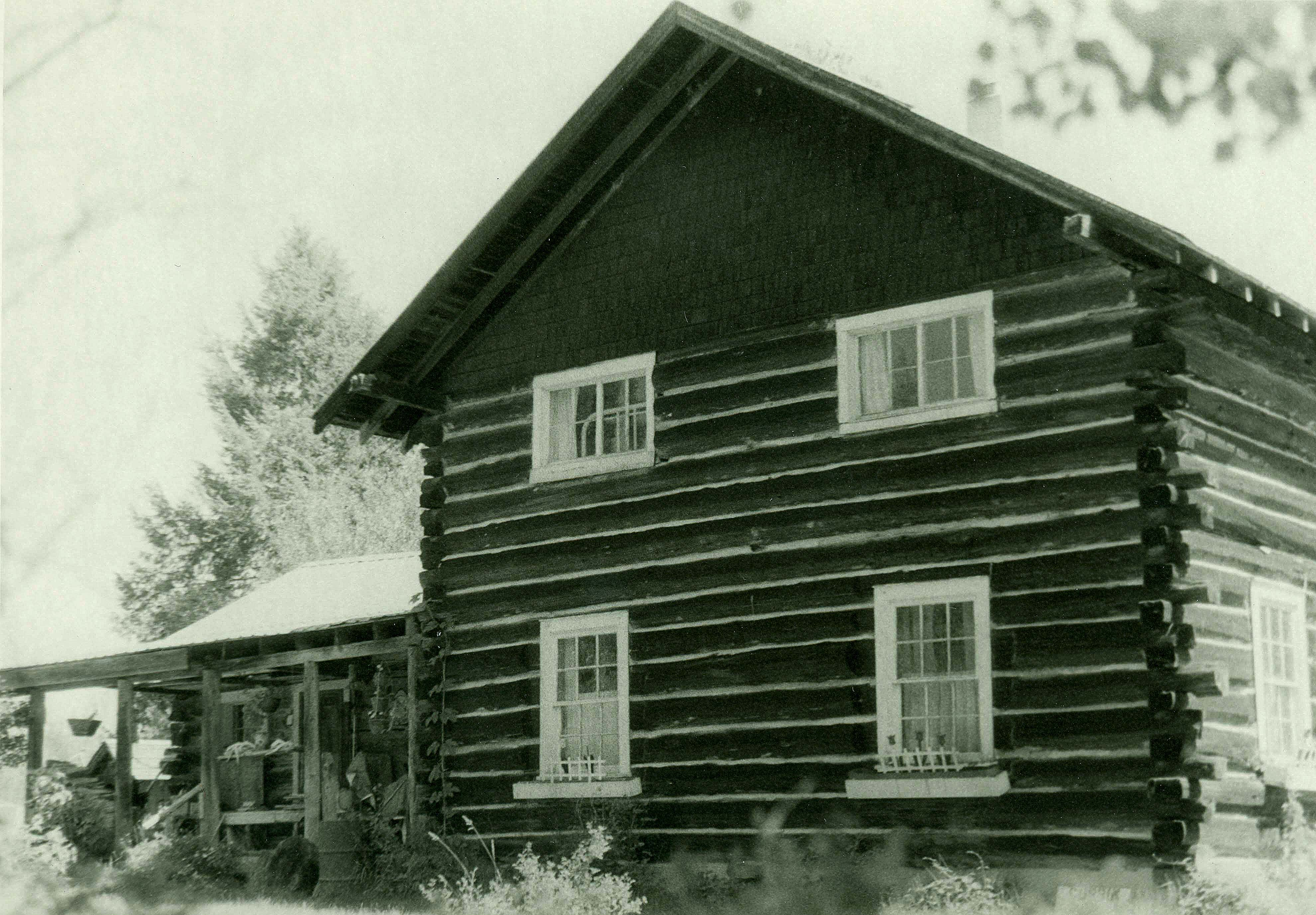
- Original Picture of Vance Lodge

- Location within Montana Location within the United States
- Location: northwest of Polebridge in Flathead County, Montana
- Area: 146 acres (59 ha)
- Built: 1920
- Built by: Vance, Andy
- Architectural style: Bungalow/craftsman, Rustic
- NRHP reference No.: 94001505
- Added to NRHP: December 29, 1994

Vance Lodge is a historic homestead located approximately half a mile northwest of Polebridge, Montana, on the north side of the Polebridge Loop Road in Flathead County. Built in 1920 by Andrew "Andy" Vance, the lodge is a significant example of early 20th-century frontier settlement and recreational development in the North Fork Valley, near the western edge of Glacier National Park. The property was added to the National Register of Historic Places (NRHP) on December 29, 1994, for its architectural and historical significance, particularly its association with early homesteading and rustic design in the region.

== Architecture and site description ==
The lodge complex comprises approximately 146 acres (59 ha) and includes multiple log structures that contribute to its historic character. The architectural style is rustic, featuring Bungalow/Craftsman influences that were common in remote Montana regions during that period. The property includes:

- Four contributing buildings
- One contributing structure
- One contributing site
- Two non-contributing structures

== Historical background ==
In 1914, Andrew Vance, his wife Ella, and their daughters Maud and May filed a homestead claim on a 160-acre tract of land north of Polebridge. They initially built a modest cabin and engaged in subsistence living, including hunting, trapping, and operating a small sawmill.

The current lodge was constructed in 1920 as a larger, more permanent dwelling. Logs were scored by Vance's grandson, Ben Hensen Jr. Jack Reuter hewed the timber and the interior finishing work was done by a carpenter known as McBlair. The resulting structure became one of the region's most substantial homesteads and served as a social hub for local residents, travelers, and trail guides associated with Glacier National Park.

== Notable events ==
A significant historic event involving Polebridge was the Red Bench Fire, which nearly destroyed the entire community on September 7, 1988. The fire destroyed 25 homes, the Polebridge Ranger Station , the community's namesake "pole bridge," and consumed numerous barns and outbuildings. According to family accounts, a firefighting aircraft diverted its retardant drop from the burned pole bridge to the nearby Vance Lodge after observers found the bridge had already burned; the lodge and its immediate vicinity were reportedly spared as a result, and the Hensen family maintained contact with the pilot for several years.

== Andy Vance and the North Fork Community ==
Andy Vance played a modest but enduring role in the development of the Polebridge area. Before settling in Montana, he worked as a buffalo hunter supplying meat to railroad workers along the Yellowstone Valley and later as a guide in Yellowstone National Park. He also participated in the Klondike Gold Rush and worked on trail crews in Glacier National Park.

Vance's construction of the lodge and his efforts as a homesteader contributed to the cultural and architectural legacy of the North Fork Valley. Vance Lodge is considered a rare surviving example of the type of homestead that existed in the region before the formal establishment and regulation of Glacier National Park boundaries.

== Later years and legacy ==
Andy Vance died in 1924 after being struck by a train near Belton, Montana. His wife, Ella, died in 1929. Their daughter May and husband, Ben Hensen Sr., continued to use the property seasonally. In the 1930s, the lodge served as a post office after the closure of the former post office located inside the Hensens’ store—built to compete with the Polebridge Mercantile’s “exorbitant” pricing. When Hensen was awarded the post office contract, his wife May submitted the name Polebridge, which was accepted. Ben Hensen Jr. later inherited postmaster duties from his father and became the youngest postmaster in the United States, serving until 1935, when the post office moved to Adair’s Store, now known as the Polebridge Mercantile. The Hensen family has continued to use the lodge seasonally for several decades.

Today, Vance Lodge stands as a symbol of early 20th-century settlement in northwestern Montana. The site reflects the self-sufficient, rugged lifestyles of the region's pioneer families. Nearby historic landmarks, such as the Polebridge Mercantile (built in 1914), served as vital supply points for early settlers. Due to the area's remoteness, residents historically relied on kerosene lighting, outhouses, and occasional mail deliveries, conditions that still partly define the Polebridge area today.

== Gallery ==
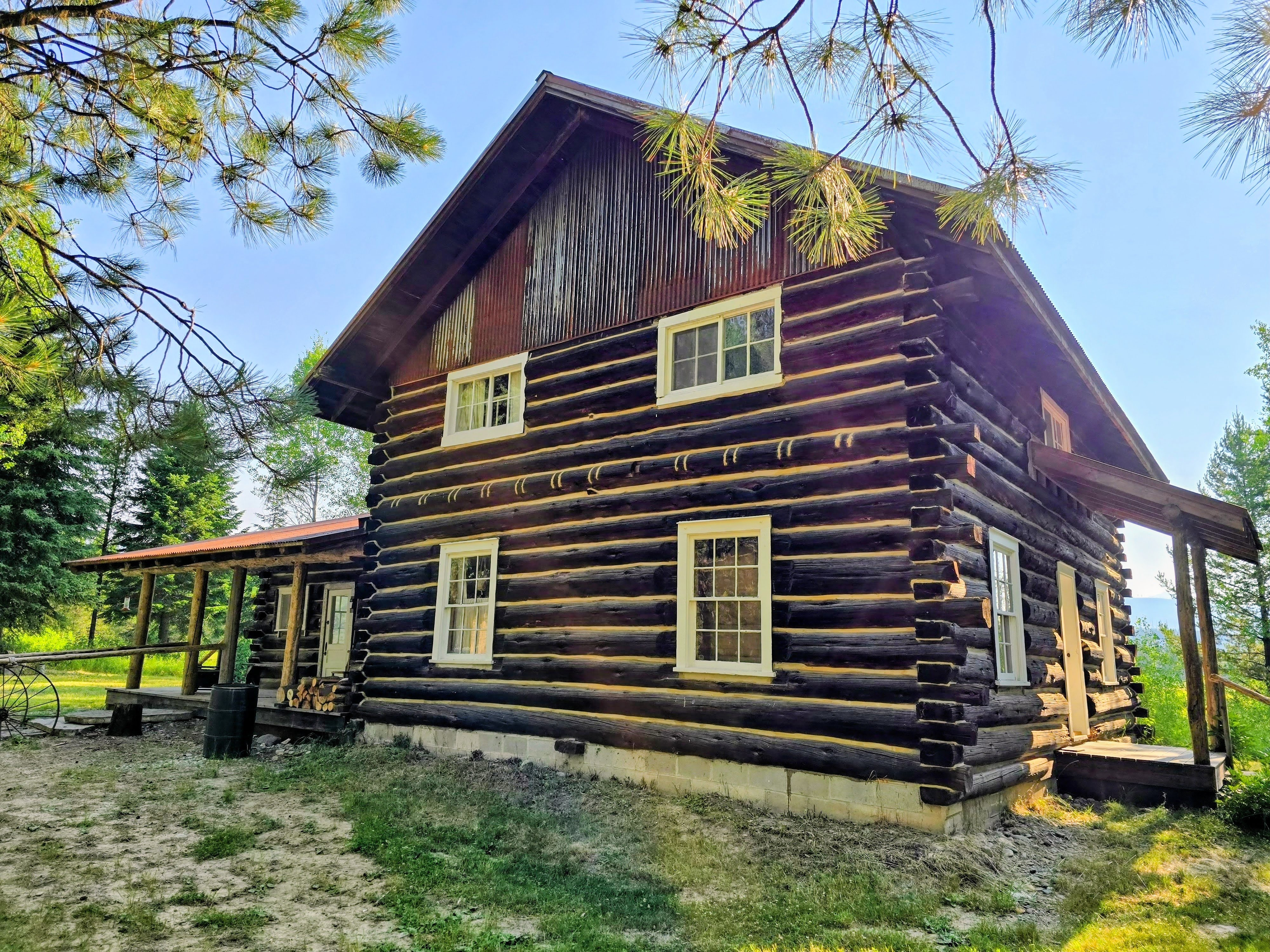

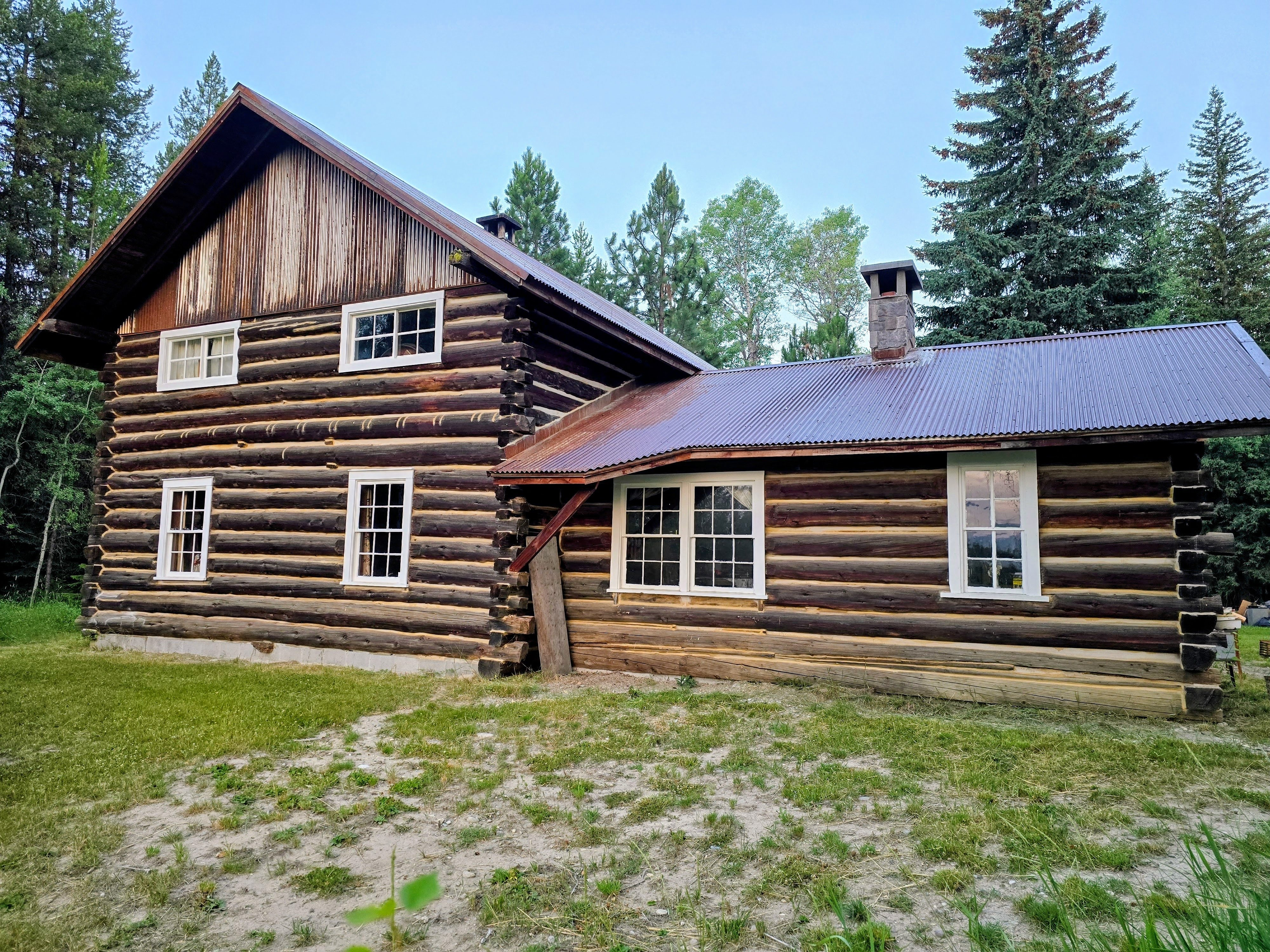

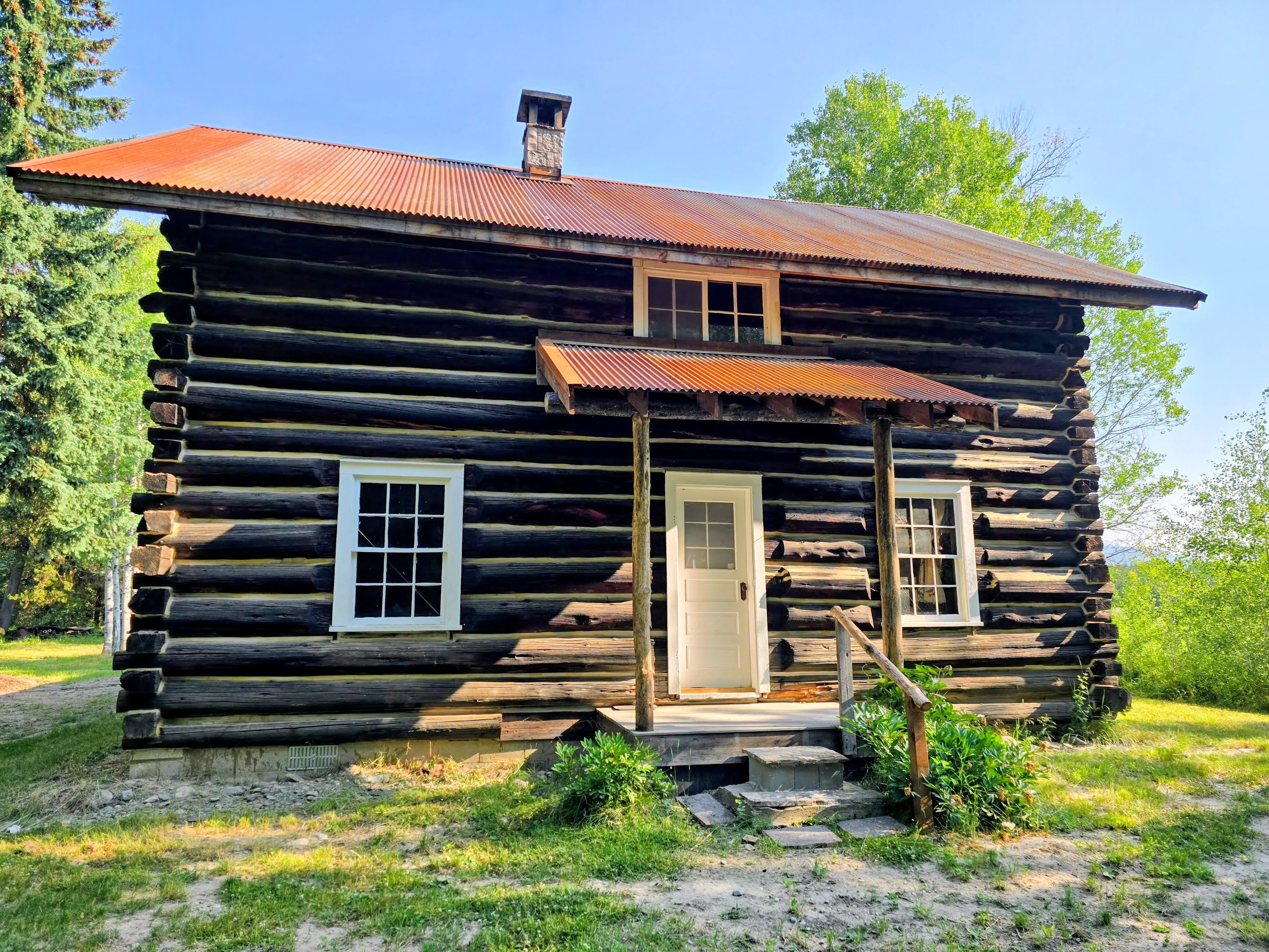

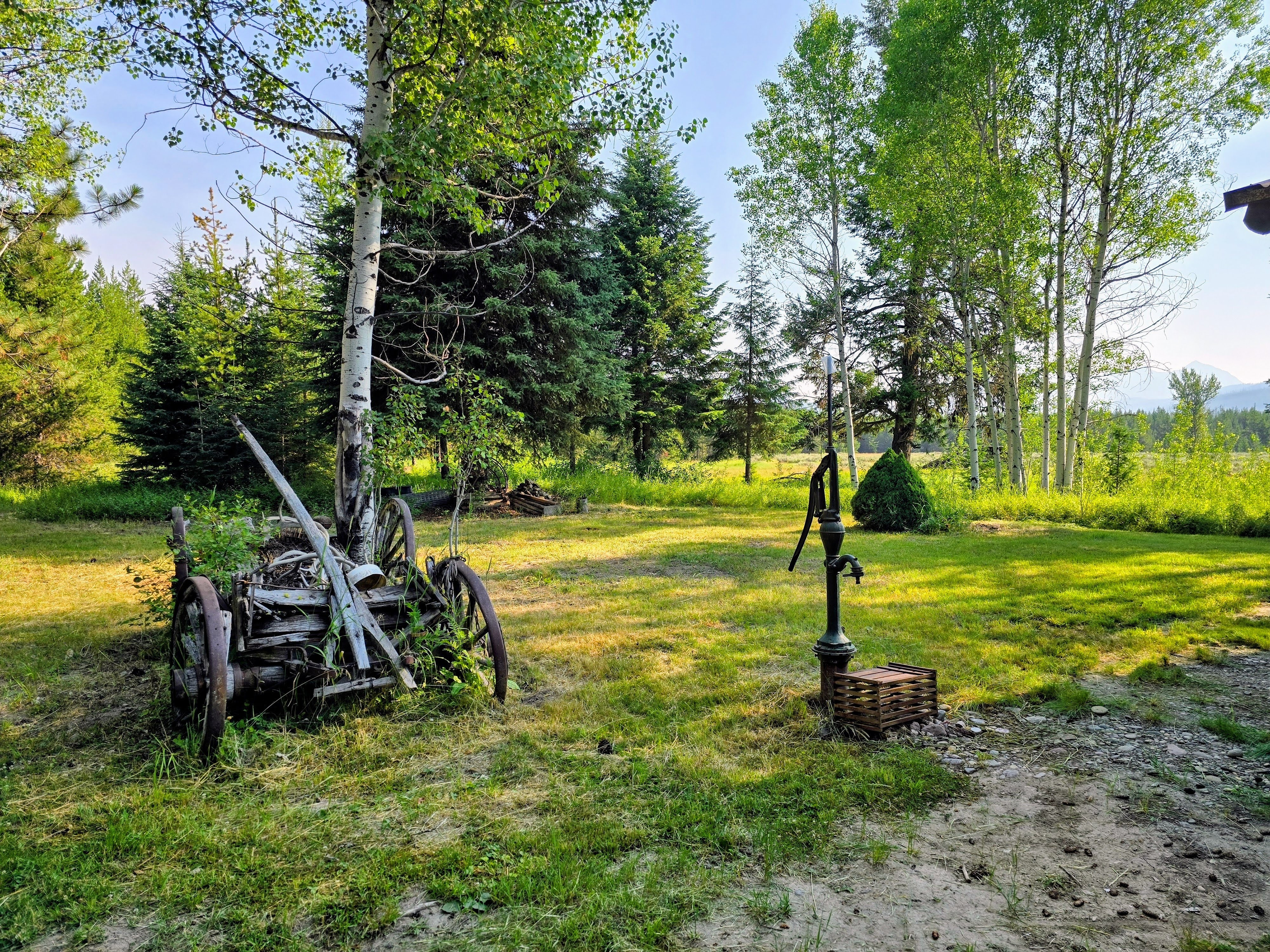

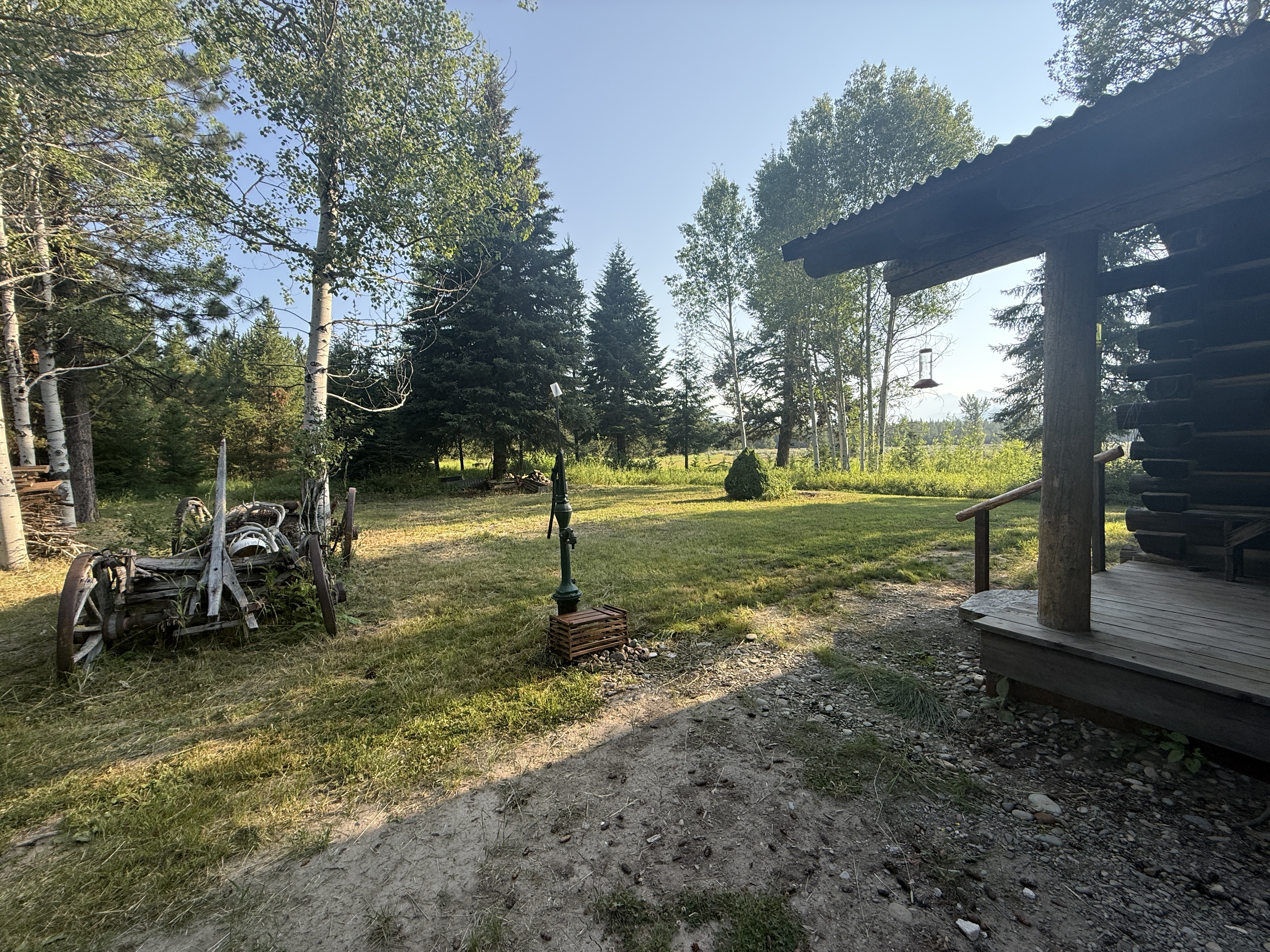

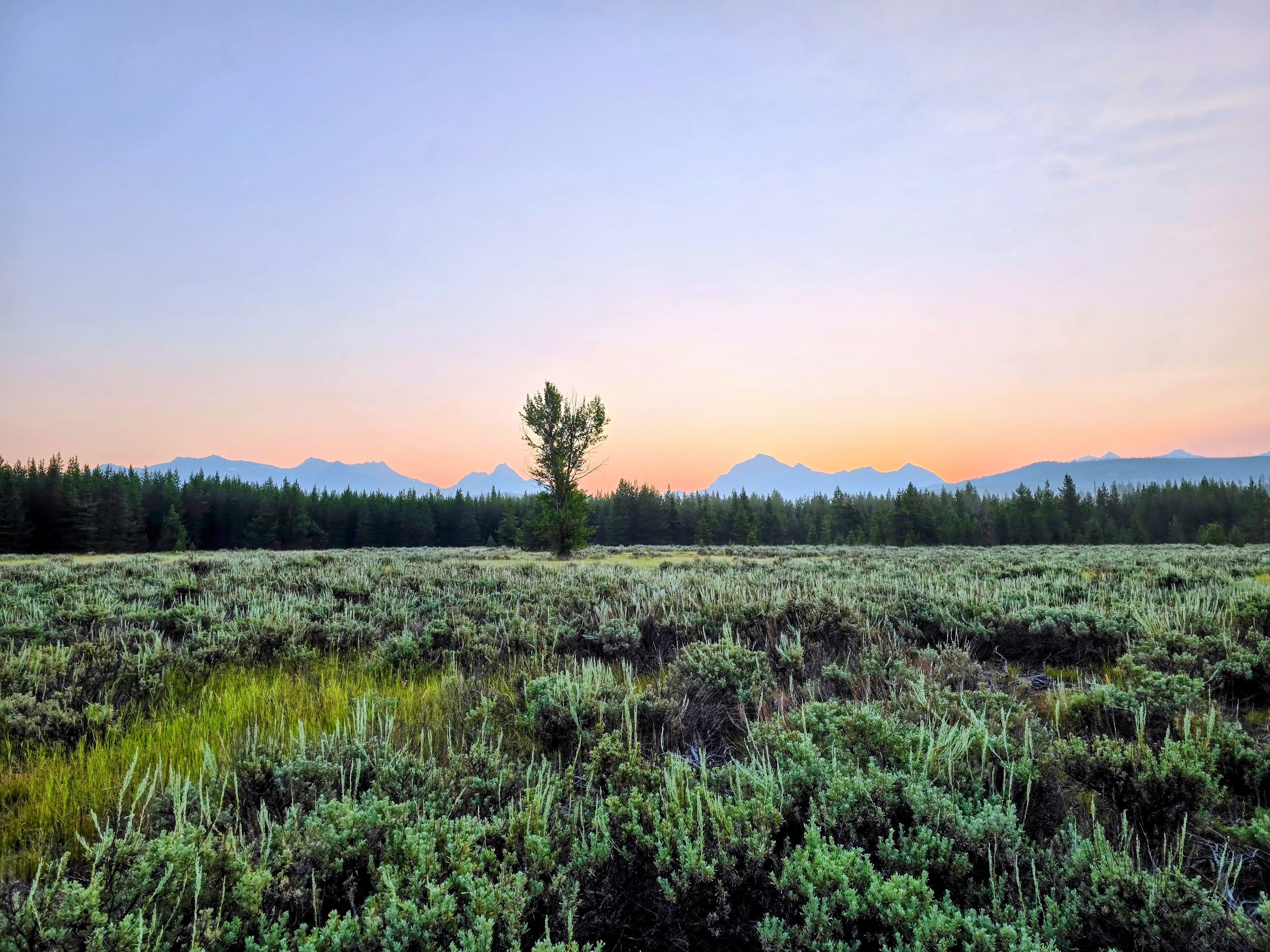

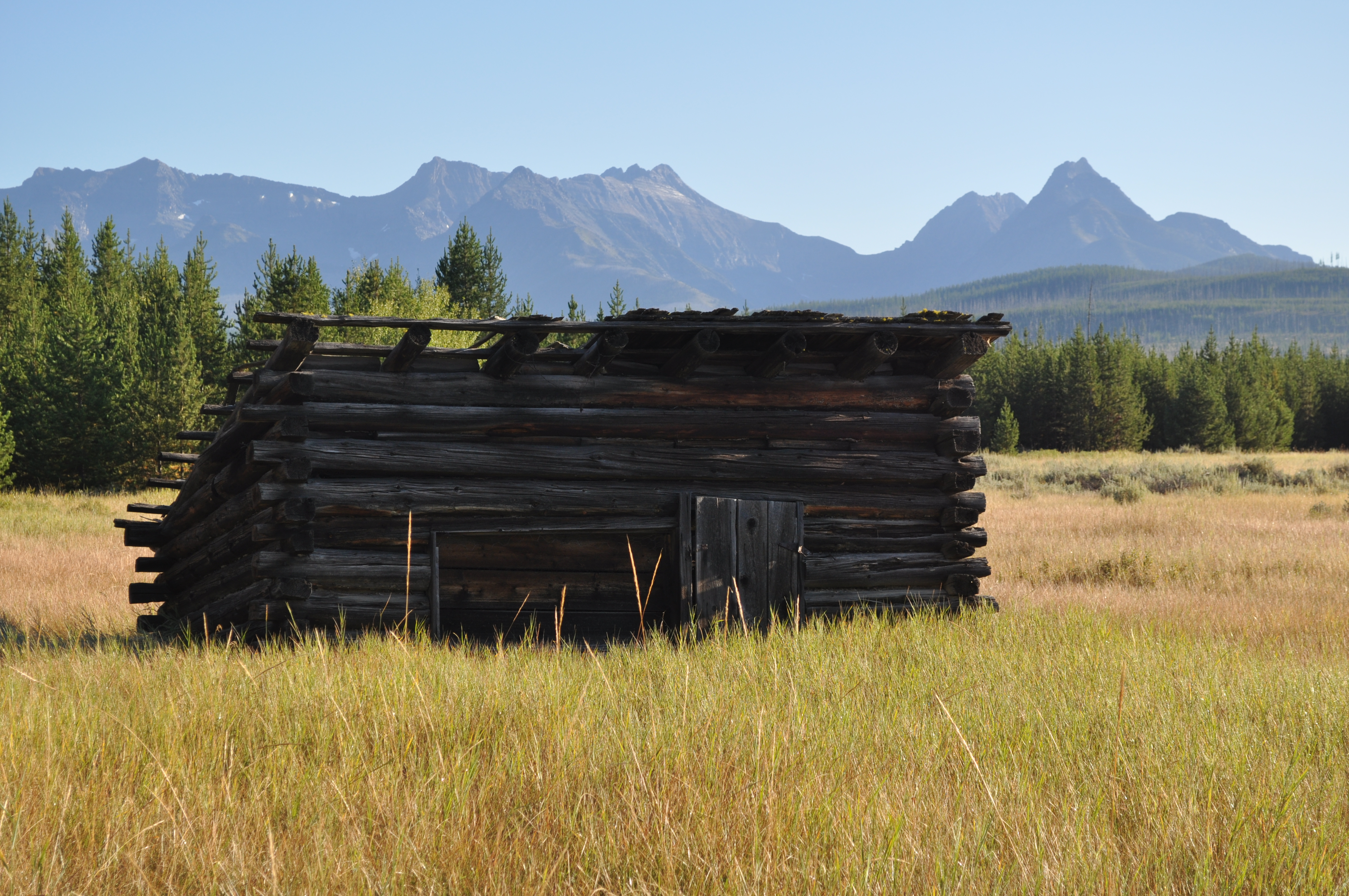

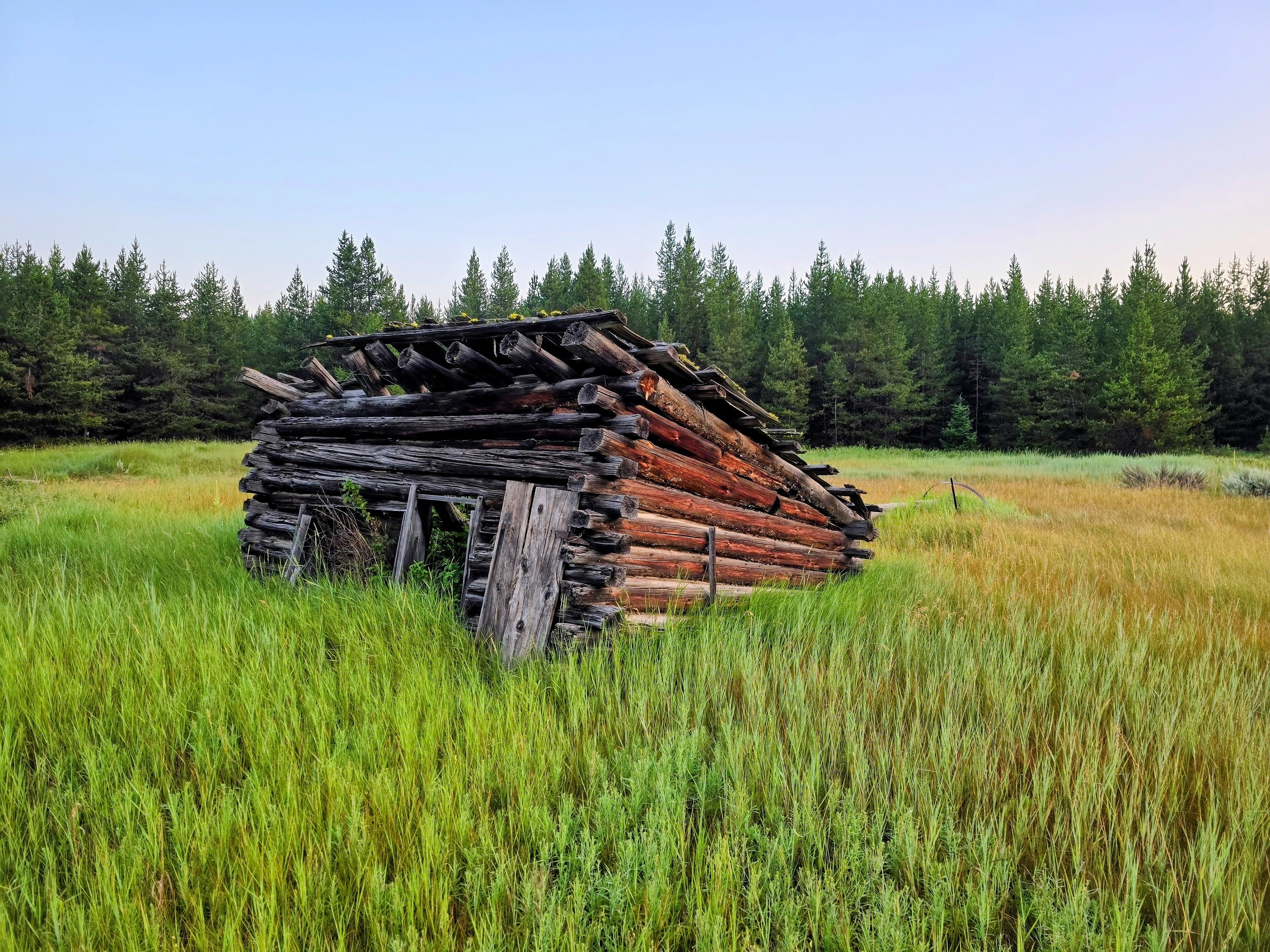

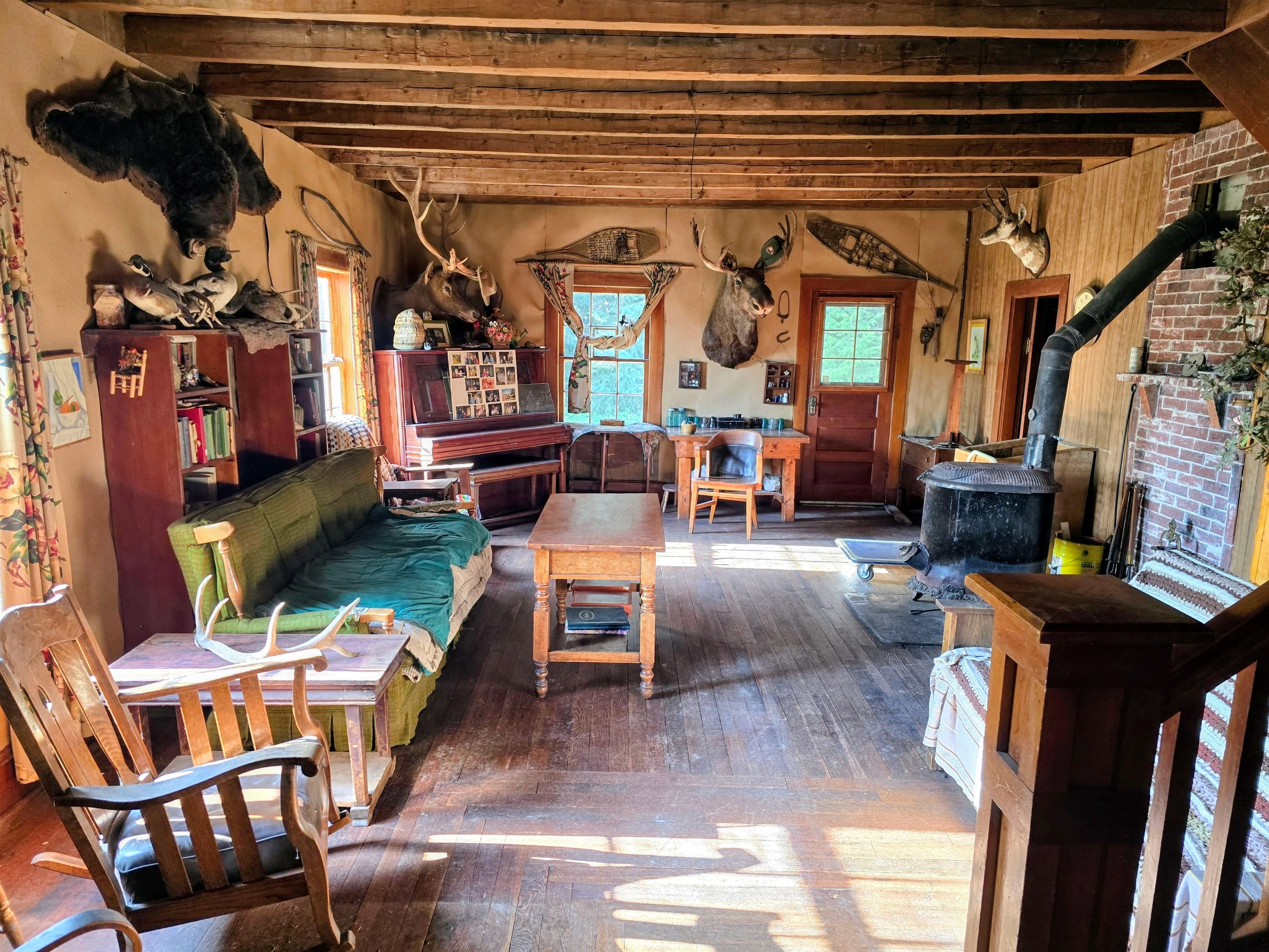

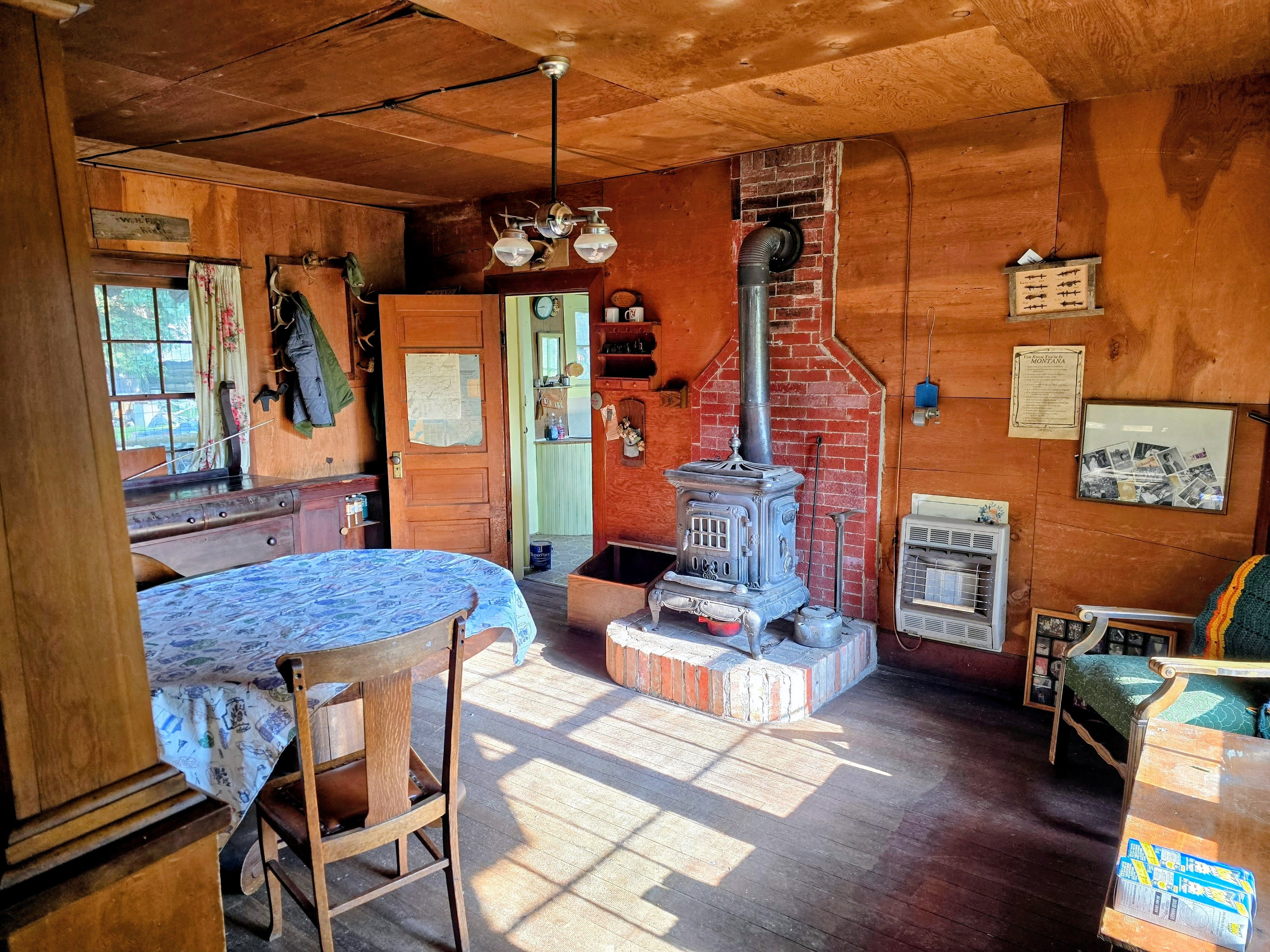

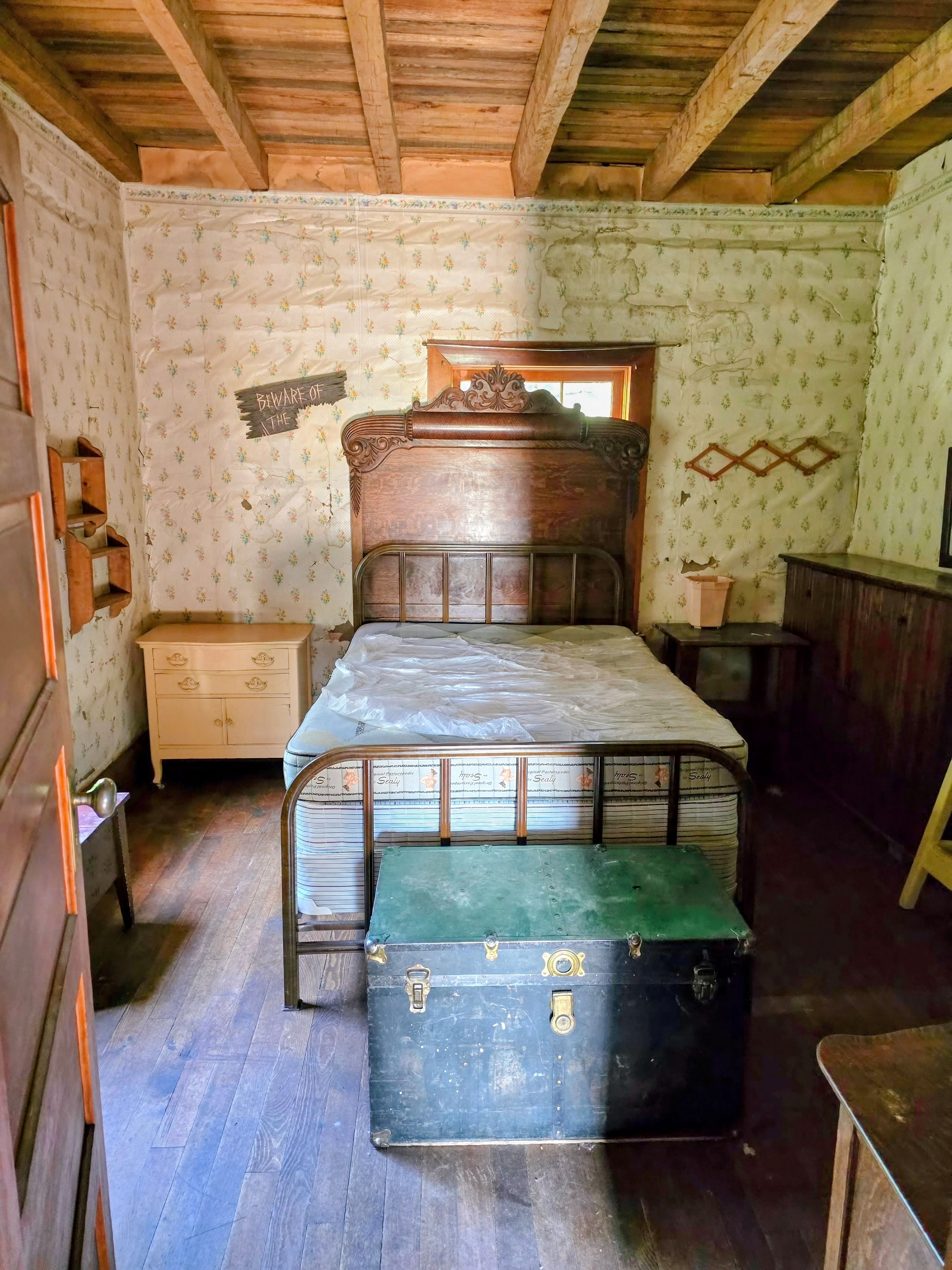

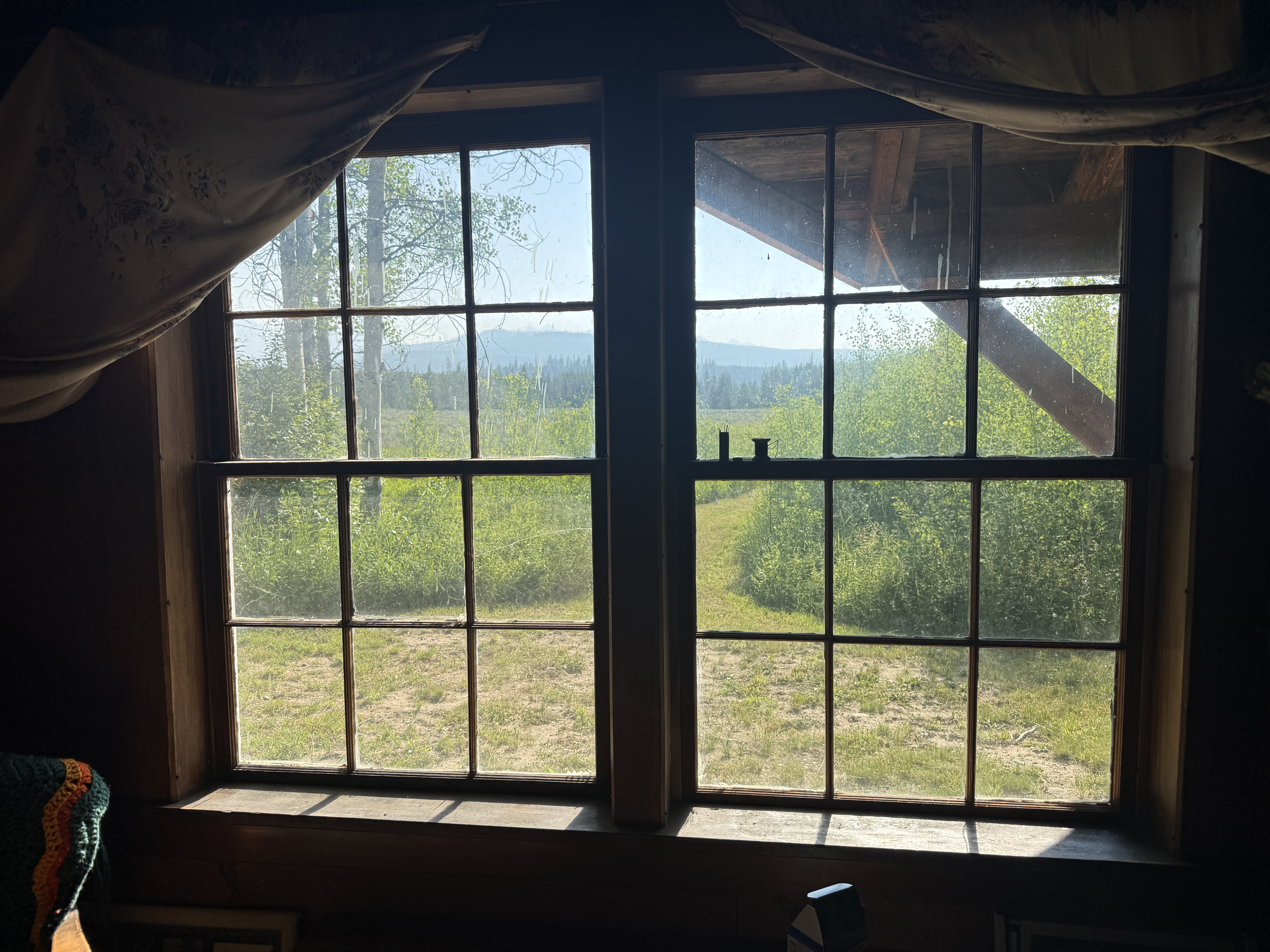

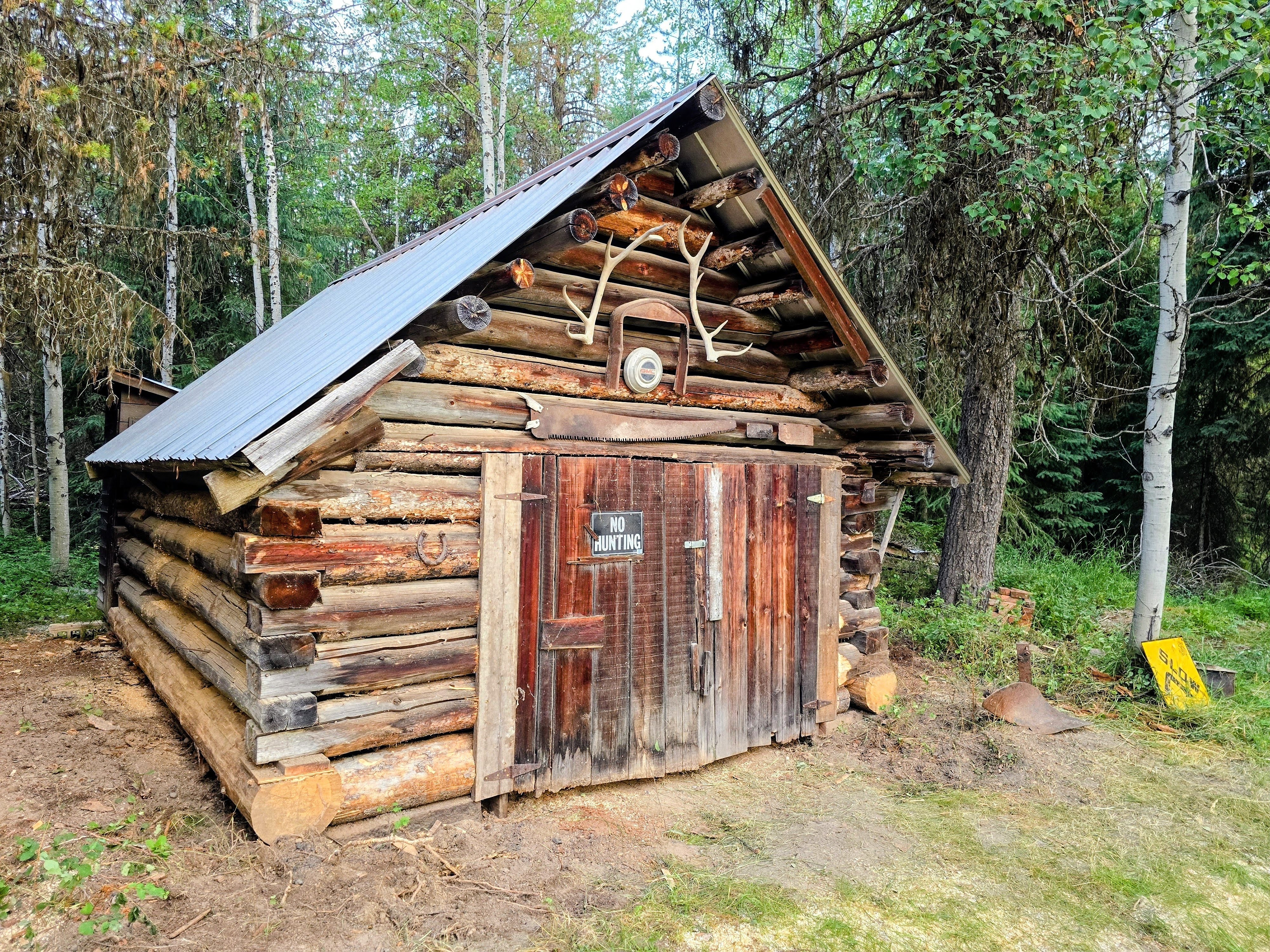

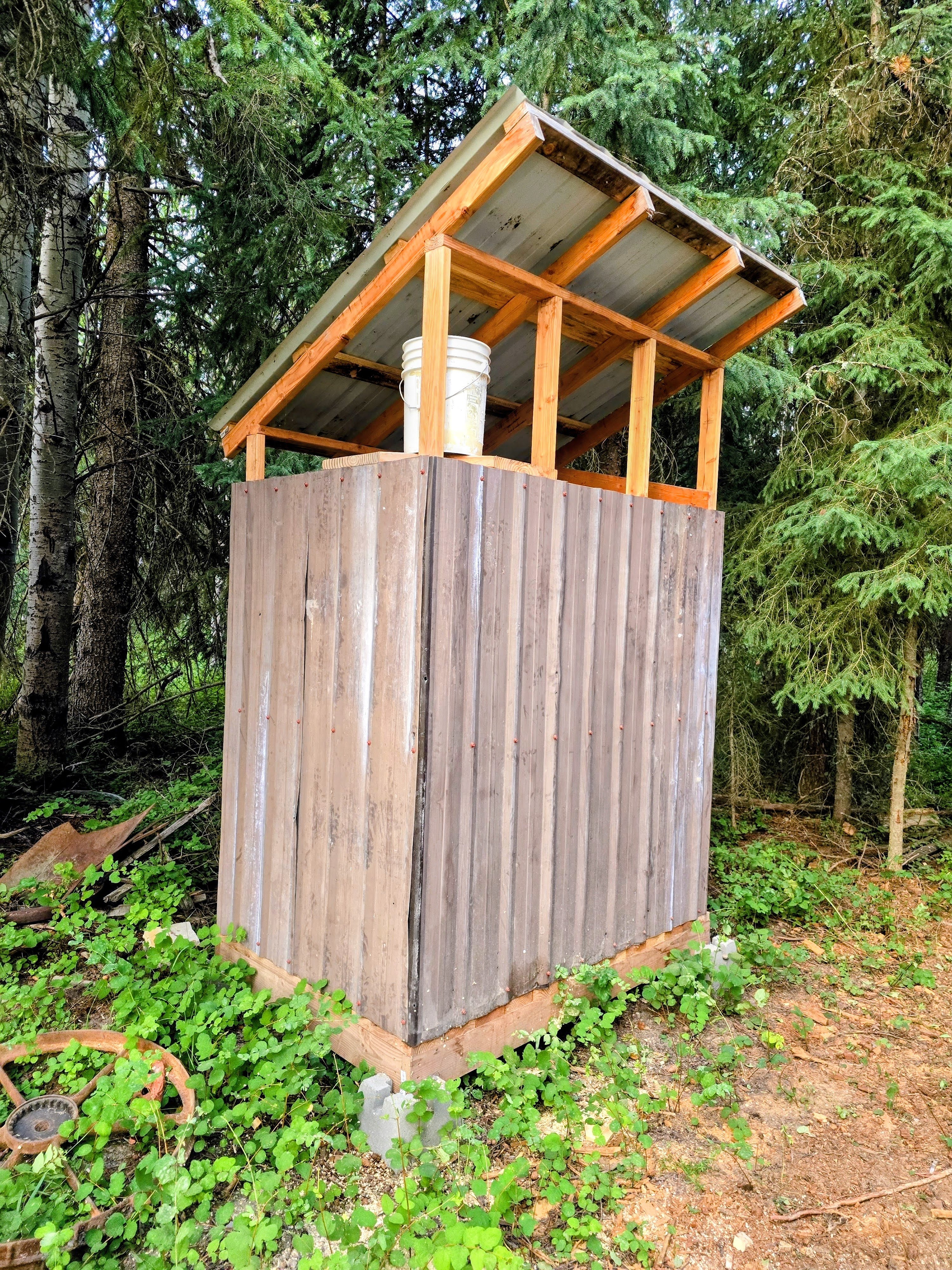

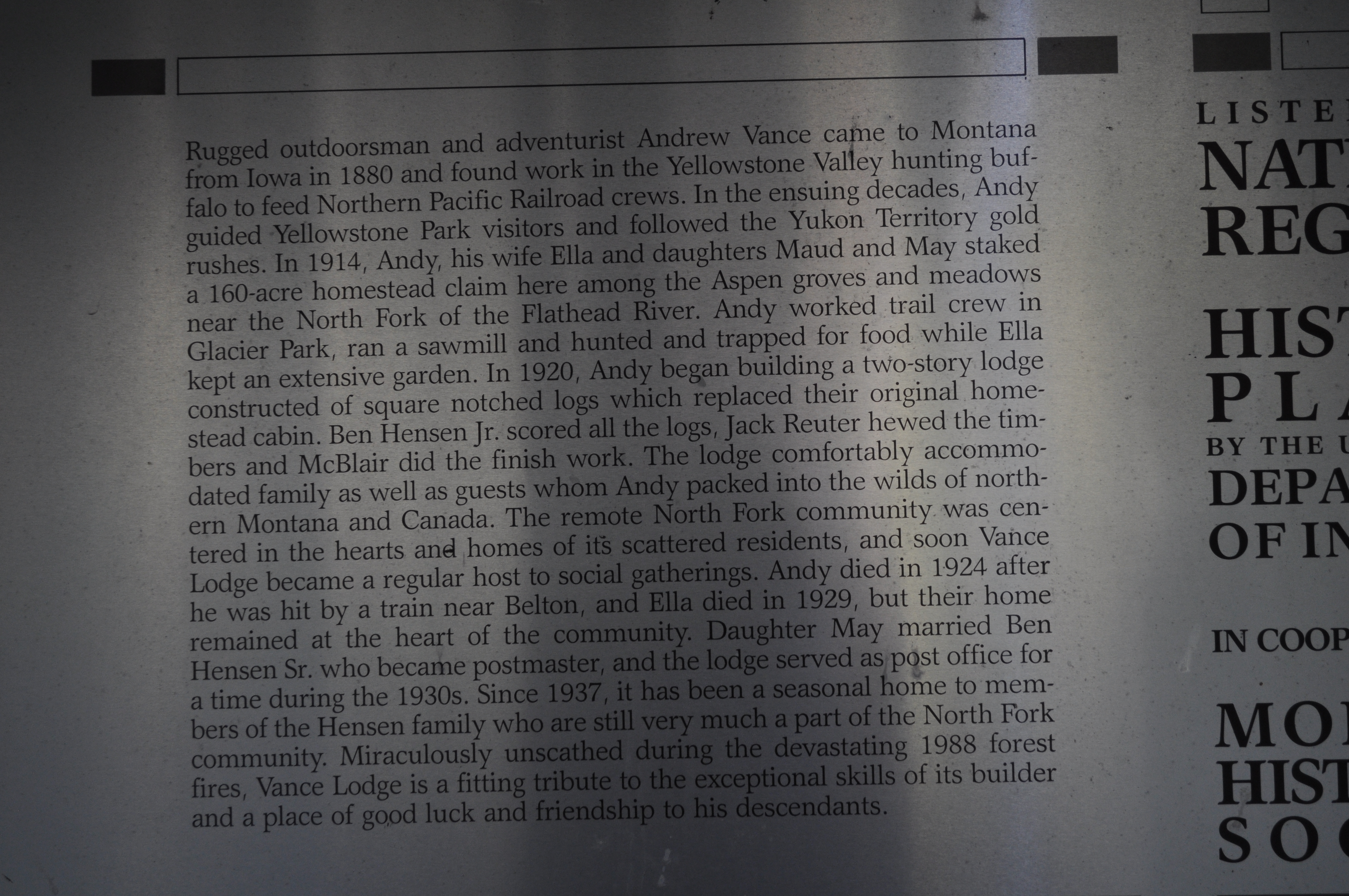

== Timeline ==
Year / Date	Event
1912	William L. “Bill” Adair moves his store from Sullivan Meadow to Polebridge and constructs a cabin (now the Northern Lights Saloon) as homesteaders build a pole bridge across the North Fork River.
1914	Adair completes construction of the general store, later known as the Polebridge Mercantile.
1920	Ben Hensen Sr. opens a competing store to the north, offering lower prices and housing a post office; a second post office opens at Trail Creek.
1920	The community, and subsequently the store, is named "Polebridge" after May Hensen’s submission when her husband Ben Sr. is awarded the post office contract.
1920	Vance Lodge is constructed by Andy Vance as a permanent homestead dwelling.
1924	Andy Vance dies after being struck by a train near Belton, Montana.
1925	Eastside mail service is redirected; Harriet Walsh remains postmistress at Kintla until the mail is transferred to Hensen’s store at Polebridge.
1929	Ella Vance passes away; May Vance Hensen continues seasonal use of the property.
1929	The post office inside Hensen’s store closes.
Early 1930s	The Vance Lodge operates as a post office; Ben Hensen Jr. becomes the youngest postmaster in the United States.
1935	The post office is relocated to Adair's Store, now the Polebridge Mercantile.
1936	Ben Hensen Sr. closes his store, likely due to the Great Depression.
1935–Present	The Hensen family continues to use the Vance Lodge seasonally.

== See also ==
- Polebridge, Montana
- Glacier National Park (U.S.)
- National Register of Historic Places listings in Flathead County, Montana
