= Wurtz Homestead =

Historic house in Montana, United States

- U.S. National Register of Historic Places
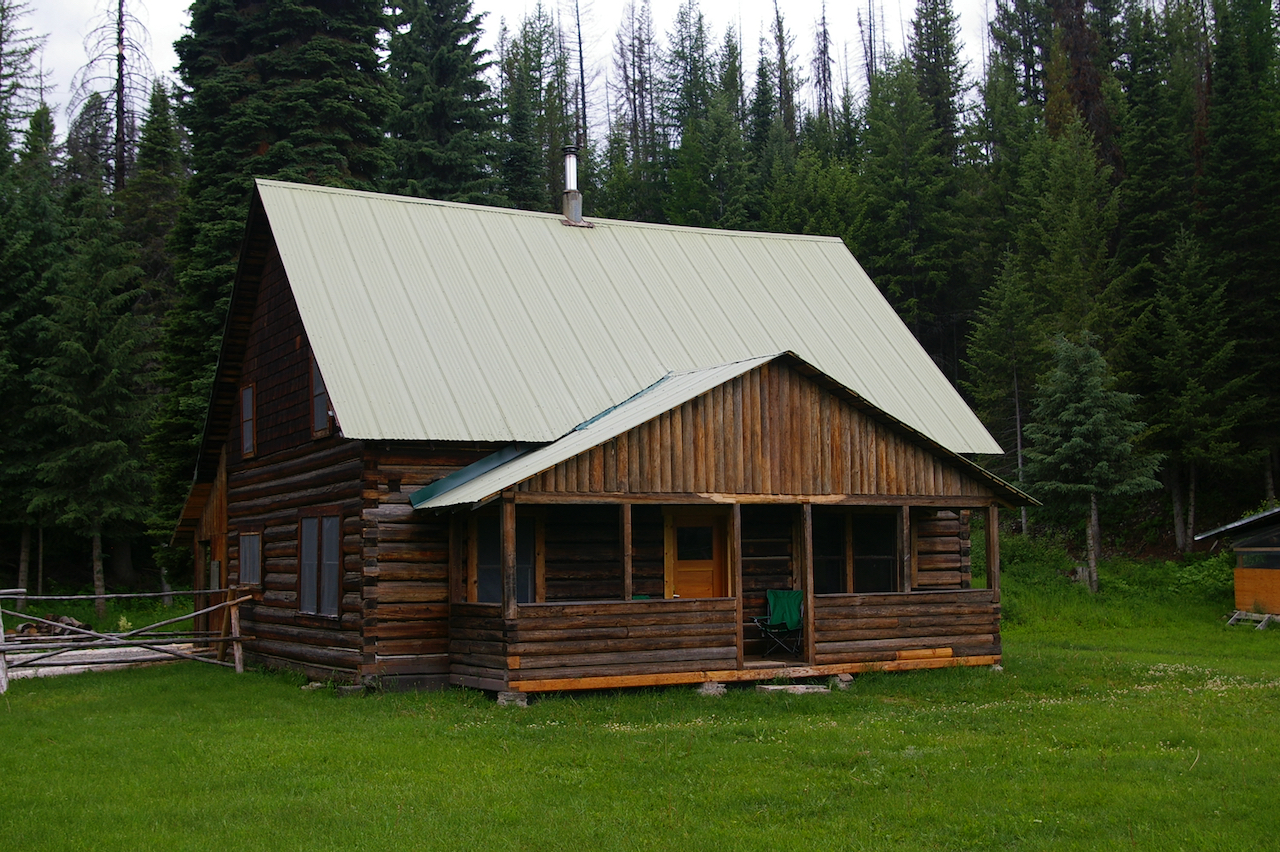
- Main cabin at Wurtz Homestead

- Location within Montana Location within the United States
- Location: North Fork Road, 2 miles (3.2 km) north of Ford in the Flathead National Forest, near Polebridge, Montana
- Coordinates: 48°53′55″N 114°23′19″W
- Built: 1913
- Built by: Frank Wurtz
- Architectural style: Rustic
- NRHP reference No.: 96000661
- Added to NRHP: June 19, 1996

The Wurtz Homestead, located on North Fork Road, 2 miles (3.2 km) north of Ford in the Flathead National Forest, near Polebridge, Montana, was listed on the National Register of Historic Places in 1996. The listing included three contributing buildings. It is located in the valley of the North Fork Flathead River, just 7 miles (11 km) south of the Canada border.

Included are:

- 1917 homestead cabin
- 1920 family home
- 1944 root cellar

A garage (1954) and a sauna (1970s) are deemed non-contributing.
