= W.L. Adair General Mercantile Historic District =

Historic district in Montana, United States

- Adair, W. L., General Mercantile Historic District
- U.S. National Register of Historic Places
- U.S. Historic district
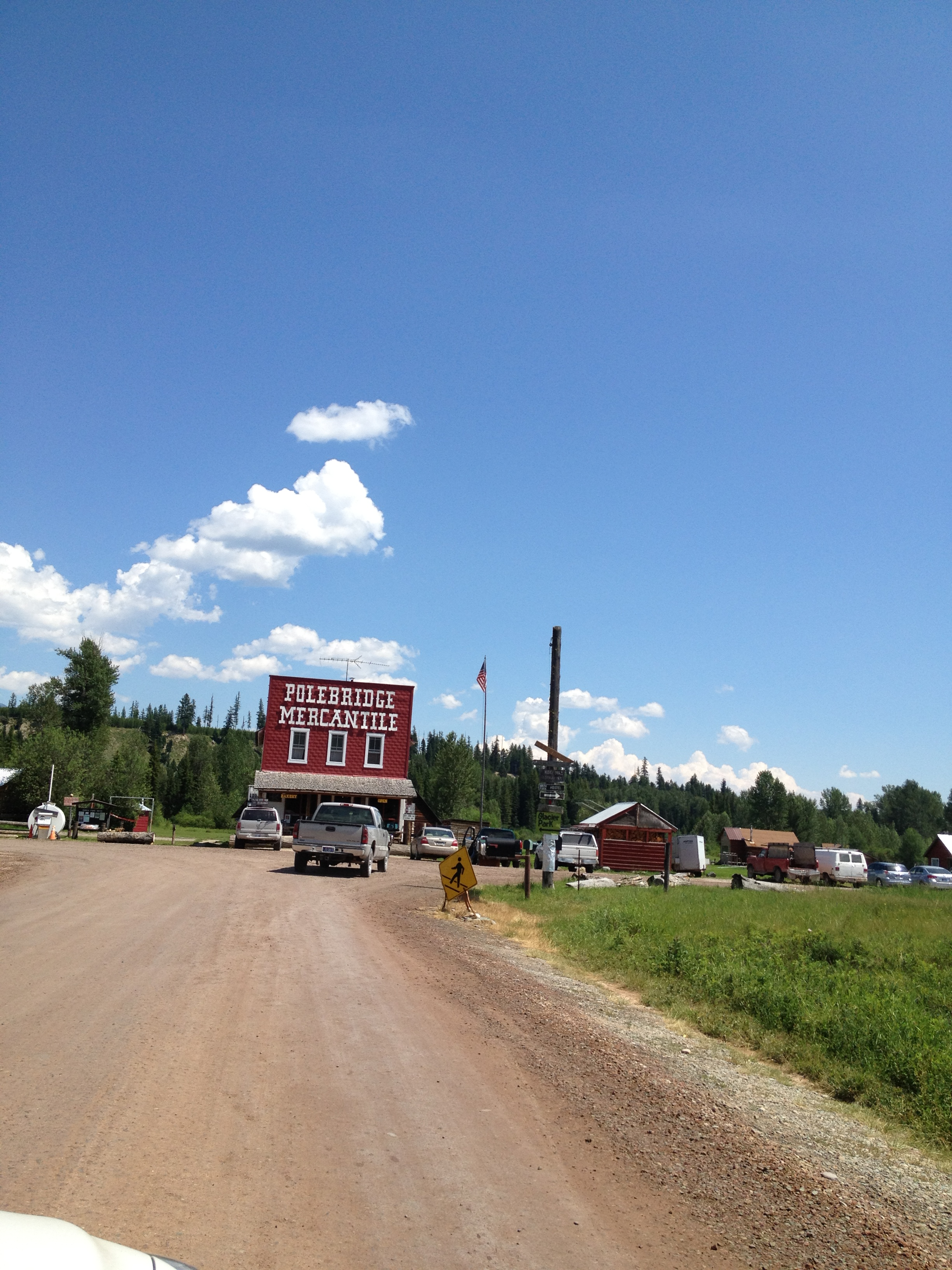

- Location within Montana Location within the United States
- Location: On Polebridge Loop Rd. 1/4 mi. E of its intersection with N. Fork Rd., Polebridge, Montana
- Coordinates: 48°45′43″N 114°17′1″W
- Area: 4 acres (1.6 ha)
- Built: 1900-1914
- Built by: Adair, William
- Architectural style: Log construction
- NRHP reference No.: 86000155
- Added to NRHP: February 6, 1986

The W. L. Adair General Mercantile Historic District is a 4 acres (1.6 ha) historic district in Polebridge in Flathead County, Montana which was listed on the National Register of Historic Places in 1986. It included five contributing buildings which were built during 1900–1914.

It is located on Polebridge Loop Rd. 1/4 mi. E of its intersection with N. Fork Rd. in or near Polebridge.

The Mercantile Store building is a wood frame, two story structure with a false front facade built in 1914. It has decorative pressed metal siding dating from 1925 or before covering the original wooden exterior. It has also been known as Polebridge Store and Polebridge Mercantile.
