= Polebridge, Montana =

American frontier town

Coordinates: 48°45′55″N 114°17′06″W

- Census-designated place
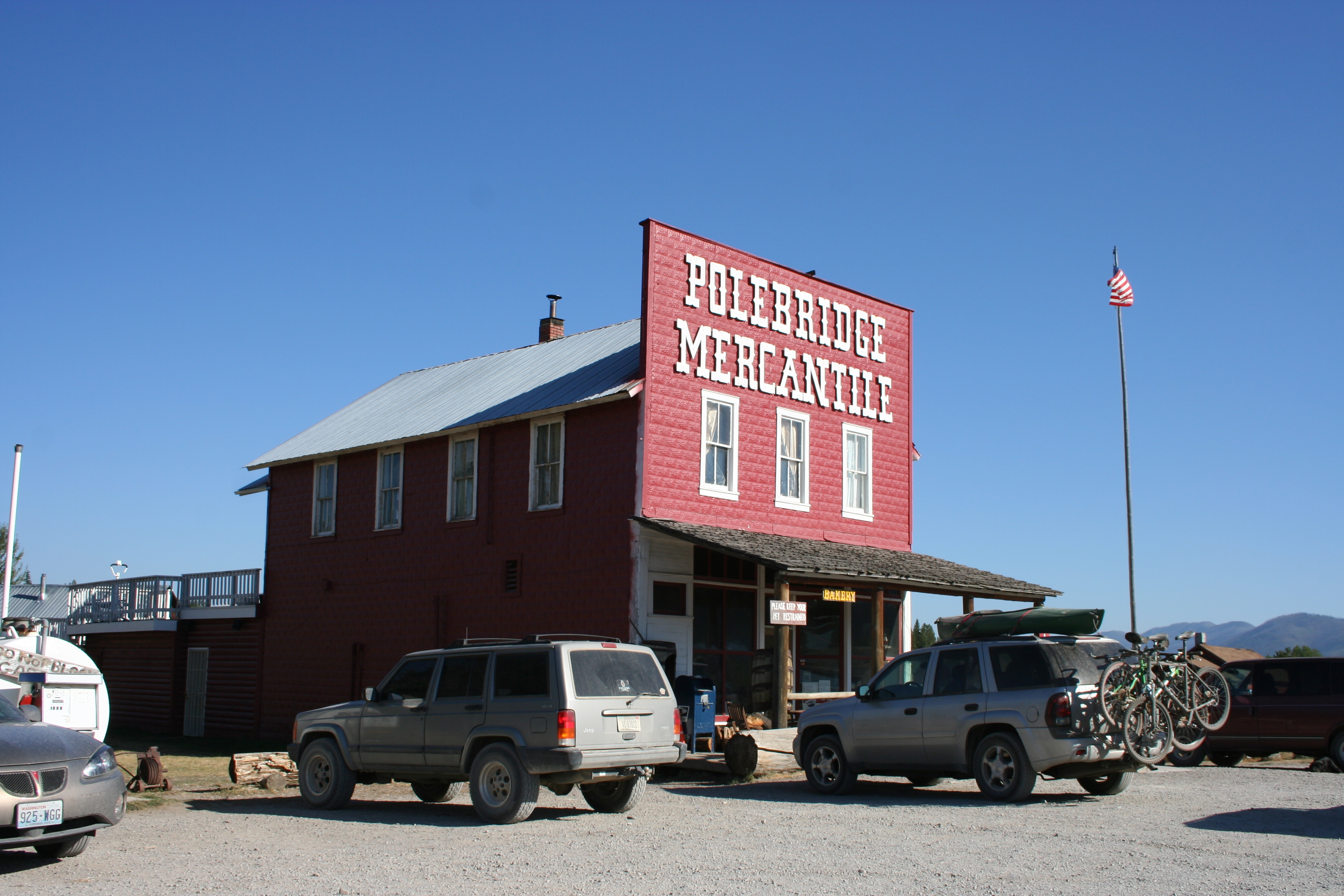
- Polebridge
- Interactive map of Polebridge, Montana
- Country: United States
- State: Montana
- County: Flathead

Area
  - Total: 0.12 sq mi (0.31 km^{2})
  - Land: 0.12 sq mi (0.30 km^{2})
  - Water: 0 sq mi (0.00 km^{2})
- Elevation: 3,527 ft (1,075 m)

Population (2022)
  - Total: 31
  - Density: 119.8/sq mi (46.25/km^{2})
- Time zone: Mountain Time Zone
- FIPS code: 30-58675
- GNIS feature ID: 2806616

Polebridge is an unincorporated community in Flathead County, Montana, United States, 35 miles (56 km) northwest of Columbia Falls in the northwestern part of the state. This community was named in 1920 for the log bridge that formerly connected the "inner" North Fork Road in Glacier National Park to the "outer" North Fork Road which leads to Montana Secondary Highway 486, over the North Fork Flathead River. Polebridge is approximately 22 miles south of the Canada–United States border. As of the 2020 census, Polebridge had a population of 14.

The W.L. Adair General Mercantile Historic District is a National Register of Historic Places-listed historic district in Polebridge. It contains the Polebridge Mercantile, which has been in operation since 1914. The store is open from May through October.

Residents do not have electricity or any form of communication other than mail or media other than newspapers. From May through October, the population is just under 100, but during the colder months it falls to the single digits.

== History ==
In the mid to late 1800s, coal, oil, and mineral exploration made the North Fork area of Montana attractive to settlers resulting in a wagon road along the valley on east side of the North Fork Flathead River and bridge over the river, bringing in more settlers. The unknown and original settlers of Polebridge and the surrounding land arrived in the 1890s; however, more arrived after the valley land east of the North Fork Flathead River became Glacier National Park in 1910 and settling was no longer allowed there. Among the settlers in Polebridge was an entrepreneur by the name of William 'Bill' L. Adair who acquired a 160 acre plot just outside of after taking advantage of the United States Homestead Acts. He built a cabin in 1912 that would later become the Northern Lights Saloon, and in 1914, he built a general store, The Polebridge Mercantile or the 'Merc'.

The Merc quickly became a central meeting location for homesteaders scattered within the 900 square mile area of the North Fork Valley as the store provided necessary products and services, including postal services until 2001, and was the only general store in the valley. Three additional buildings were constructed that would become part of the W.L. Adair General Mercantile Historical District: the log Ice House (1914), the Log Barn (1917), and the wood frame Machine Shed/Shop (1925). Later, more structures were added to the Polebridge community: four wood frame cabins (1945), a greenhouse (1968), a generator building (1969), a propane tank shelter (1982), and four outhouses (years unknown). In 1983 the District was placed on the National Register of Historic Places after Karen Feather, owner of the Northern Lights Saloon at the time, and Jerry DeSanto, a Polebridge Sub-District Ranger with the NPS, completed the nomination form.

Another notable historic event involving Polebridge was the Red Bench Fire that almost destroyed the entire community on September 7, 1988. The fire "destroyed 25 homes, the Polebridge Ranger Station, the community's namesake 'pole bridge,' and consumed numerous barns and outbuildings".

Today Polebridge is a popular addition to the itineraries of tourists visiting Glacier National Park and the surrounding area because of its historical significance and off-the-grid way of life.

== Climate ==
Climate data for Polebridge, Montana, 1991–2020 normals, 1933–2020 extremes: 3520ft (1073m)
Month	Jan	Feb	Mar	Apr	May	Jun	Jul	Aug	Sep	Oct	Nov	Dec	Year
Record high °F (°C)	58 (14)	60 (16)	72 (22)	86 (30)	92 (33)	96 (36)	101 (38)	102 (39)	99 (37)	85 (29)	65 (18)	53 (12)	102 (39)
Mean maximum °F (°C)	45.5 (7.5)	48.3 (9.1)	58.0 (14.4)	70.2 (21.2)	79.6 (26.4)	84.5 (29.2)	90.6 (32.6)	91.3 (32.9)	84.5 (29.2)	72.8 (22.7)	53.3 (11.8)	43.6 (6.4)	93.0 (33.9)
Mean daily maximum °F (°C)	31.4 (−0.3)	35.2 (1.8)	43.8 (6.6)	53.7 (12.1)	63.4 (17.4)	70.2 (21.2)	81.4 (27.4)	82.0 (27.8)	70.4 (21.3)	54.4 (12.4)	39.1 (3.9)	31.0 (−0.6)	54.7 (12.6)
Daily mean °F (°C)	20.8 (−6.2)	21.8 (−5.7)	30.1 (−1.1)	38.8 (3.8)	47.7 (8.7)	54.5 (12.5)	60.9 (16.1)	59.9 (15.5)	51.1 (10.6)	40.1 (4.5)	29.0 (−1.7)	20.6 (−6.3)	39.6 (4.2)
Mean daily minimum °F (°C)	10.1 (−12.2)	8.4 (−13.1)	16.4 (−8.7)	23.8 (−4.6)	32.0 (0.0)	38.7 (3.7)	40.4 (4.7)	37.8 (3.2)	31.8 (−0.1)	25.7 (−3.5)	18.9 (−7.3)	10.1 (−12.2)	24.5 (−4.2)
Mean minimum °F (°C)	−22.3 (−30.2)	−17.0 (−27.2)	−5.7 (−20.9)	11.4 (−11.4)	20.2 (−6.6)	27.8 (−2.3)	30.8 (−0.7)	26.8 (−2.9)	21.1 (−6.1)	9.0 (−12.8)	−4.0 (−20.0)	−16.0 (−26.7)	−30.7 (−34.8)
Record low °F (°C)	−46 (−43)	−45 (−43)	−38 (−39)	−12 (−24)	−5 (−21)	21 (−6)	18 (−8)	−6 (−21)	5 (−15)	−21 (−29)	−38 (−39)	−48 (−44)	−48 (−44)
Average precipitation inches (mm)	2.01 (51)	1.37 (35)	1.44 (37)	1.36 (35)	1.41 (36)	2.39 (61)	1.37 (35)	1.12 (28)	1.43 (36)	1.32 (34)	2.32 (59)	1.91 (49)	19.45 (496)
Source 1: NOAA (1981–2010 precipitation)
Source 2: XMACIS2 (records & monthly max/mins)

== Demographics ==
Demographic Summary (based on 2022 Census Data)
Category	Value	Unit of Measurement	Margin of Error (±%)
Total Population	31	people	at least 10% of the total value
Density	265.3	people per square mile	N/A
Age	65≤	years of age	at least 10% of the total value
Sex	52% Male	N/A	at least 10% of the total value
Race & Ethnicity	100% White	N/A	at least 10% of the total value
Average Household Income	<50k	U.S. Dollars	at least 10% of the total value
Households	16	N/A	N/A
Marital Status	100% Now Married	N/A	at least 10% of the total value
Educational Attainment	100% High school grad or higher	N/A	at least 10% of the total value
Population with Veteran Status	51.6%	N/A	at least 10% of the total value

== See also ==
- Glacier View Dam, proposed in the 1940s, which would have inundated Polebridge
