= Bader-Jaquette and Westwang Houses and Rental Property =

- Bader--Jaquette and Westwang Houses and Rental Property
- U.S. National Register of Historic Places
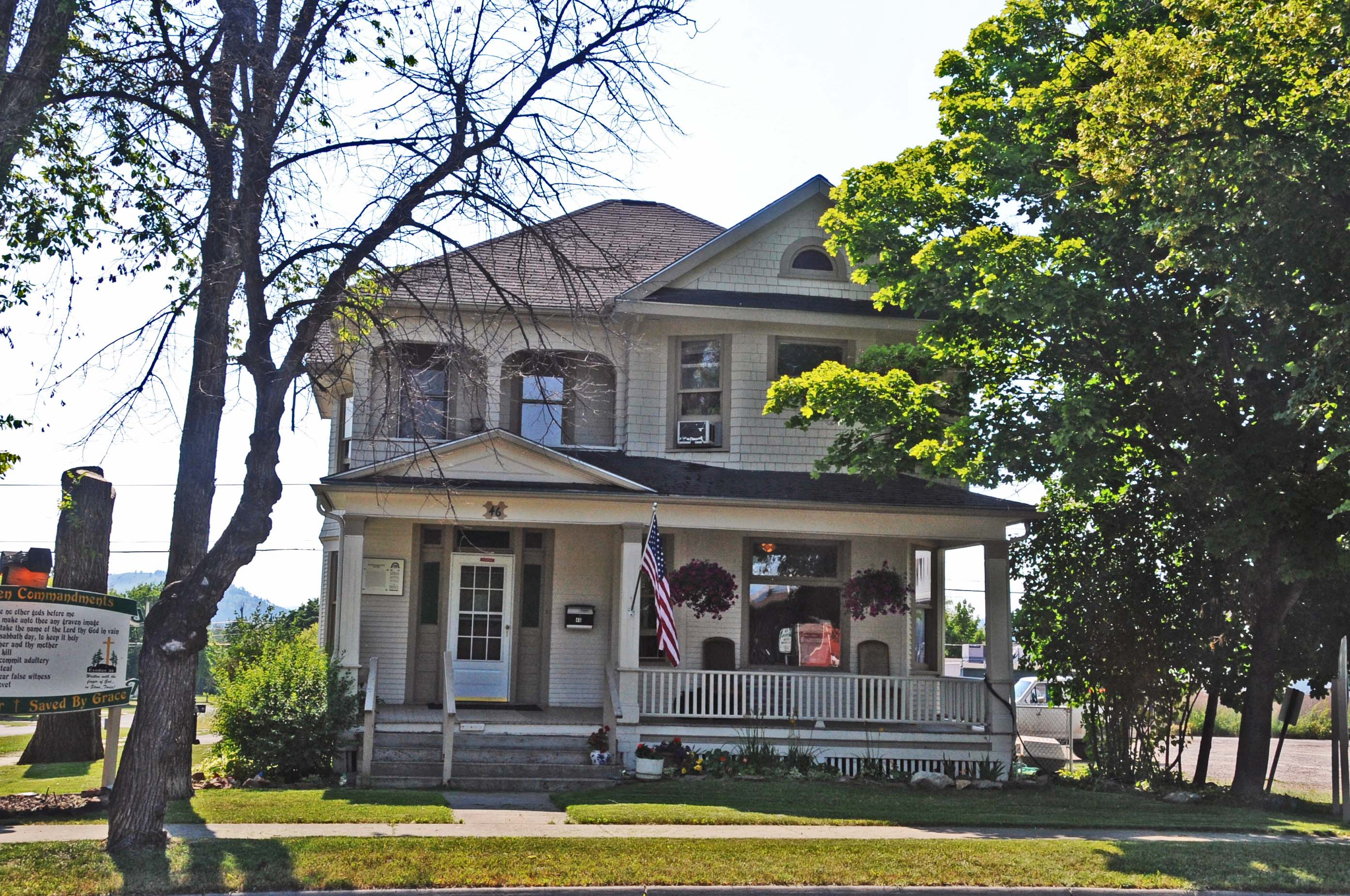

- Location within Montana Location within the United States
- Location: 46 and 36 5th Ave. W., Kalispell, Montana
- Coordinates: 48°11′48″N 114°19′14″W
- Area: less than one acre
- Built: 1903
- Built by: Elmer Bader
- Architectural style: Queen Anne
- MPS: Kalispell MPS
- NRHP reference No.: 94000871
- Added to NRHP: August 24, 1994

The Bader-Jaquette and Westwang Houses and Rental Property in 46 and 36 5th Ave. W. in Kalispell, Montana was listed on the National Register of Historic Places in 1994. The listing included three contributing buildings.

According to the NRHP nomination,

The two-story Bader/Jaquette House has typical Queen Anne features including the hipped roof with lower cross gable, the pent roof enclosing the front gable, the recessed second-floor porch, the full front porch, the two-story cutaway bay windows on the front gable, the stained glass and leaded glass windows, the pediment at the entry, the two-story bay window on the south, and the varied siding (wood shingles on the second floor and clapboard on the first floor).

The Bader/Jaquette House was built in 1903 by carpenter and lumber retailer Elmer Bader.
