= Kalispell Monumental Company =

- U.S. National Register of Historic Places
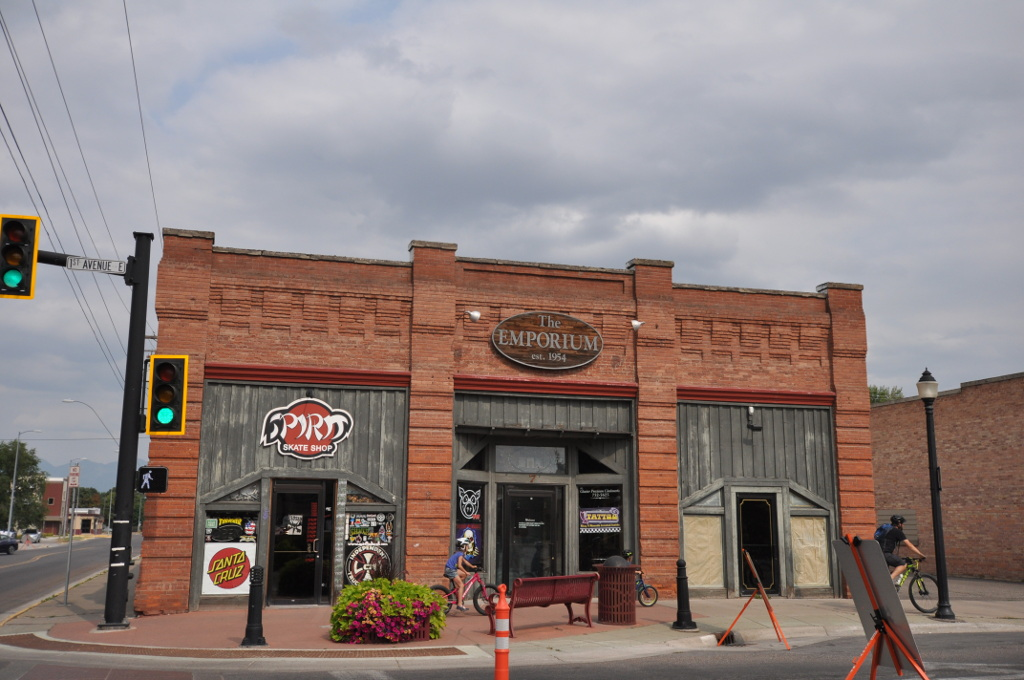

- Location within Montana Location within the United States
- Location: 7 First Ave. E., Kalispell, Montana
- Coordinates: 48°11′55″N 114°18′40″W
- Area: less than one acre
- Built: 1911
- Architect: Joseph Gibson
- MPS: Kalispell MPS
- NRHP reference No.: 94000898
- Added to NRHP: August 24, 1994

The Kalispell Monumental Company, at 7 First Ave. E. in Kalispell, Montana, was built in 1911. It was listed on the National Register of Historic Places in 1994.

It was built to serve as a tombstone and monument retail company store, as a branch of Spokane's Sammis Monumental Company. Because it would receive and process marble and other stone blocks, being located next to a railway was necessary.

It was designed by Kalispell architect Joseph Gibson and was built at a cost of $12,000.

It later served as Main Street Motors and as Glory Day Emporium.
