= Beaman House =

Historic house in Montana, United States

- U.S. National Register of Historic Places
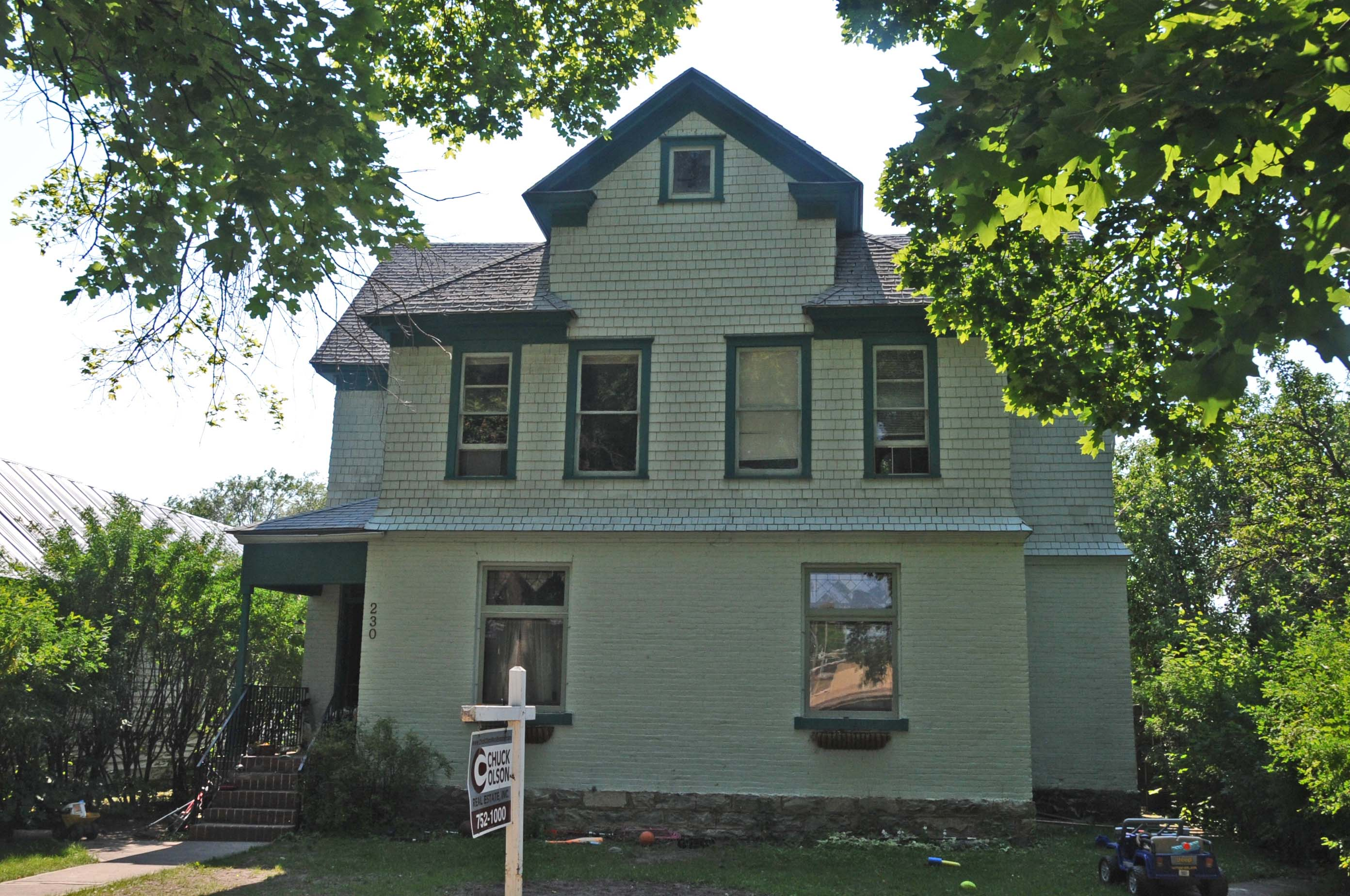

- Location within Montana Location within the United States
- Location: 230 Fourth Ave. W., Kalispell, Montana
- Coordinates: 48°11′43″N 114°19′05″W
- Area: less than one acre
- Built: 1895
- Architectural style: Queen Anne
- MPS: Kalispell MPS
- NRHP reference No.: 94000872
- Added to NRHP: August 24, 1994

The Beaman House, located at 230 Fourth Ave. W. in Kalispell, Montana, is a Queen Anne-style house built in 1895. It was listed on the National Register of Historic Places in 1994.

It is a two-story building with a hipped roof plus four intersecting gabled wings.
