= Upper Nyack Snowshoe Cabin =

- U.S. National Register of Historic Places
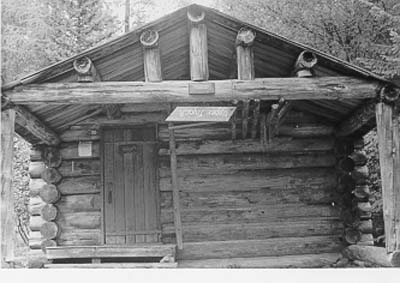

- Location within Montana Location within the United States
- Nearest city: West Glacier, Montana
- Coordinates: 48°32′52″N 113°34′0″W
- Built: 1926
- MPS: Glacier National Park MRA
- NRHP reference No.: 86000377
- Added to NRHP: February 14, 1986

The Upper Nyack Snowshoe Cabin, built in 1926 in Glacier National Park, is a significant resource both architecturally and historically as a shelter, usually 8–12 miles apart, for patrolling backcountry rangers. The design is similar to that used in Yellowstone National Park, which was in turn adapted from U.S. Forest Service shelters, which were themselves adaptations of trapper cabins. Upper Nyack retains some original interior furnishings, including hanging beds.

== See also ==
- Lower Nyack Snowshoe Cabin
