= Lower Nyack Snowshoe Cabin =

- U.S. National Register of Historic Places
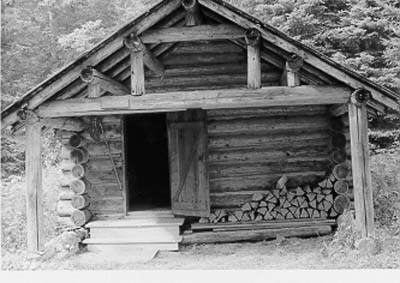

- Location within Montana Location within the United States
- Nearest city: West Glacier, Montana
- Coordinates: 48°29′47″N 113°41′16″W
- Built: 1927
- MPS: Glacier National Park MRA
- NRHP reference No.: 86000356
- Added to NRHP: February 14, 1986

The Lower Nyack Snowshoe Cabin, built in 1927 in Glacier National Park, is a significant resource both architecturally and historically as a shelter about one day's travel north of the Theodore Roosevelt Highway for patrolling backcountry rangers. The design originated at Yellowstone National Park, adapted in this case with a somewhat larger size.

== See also ==
- Upper Nyack Snowshoe Cabin
