= List of mountains in Glacier County, Montana =

There are at least 124 named mountains in Glacier County, Montana.

- Allen Mountain, 48°45′29″N 113°39′27″W, el. 9,396 feet (2,864 m)
- Almost-a-Dog Mountain, 48°37′22″N 113°37′08″W, el. 8,920 feet (2,720 m)
- Altyn Peak, 48°48′48″N 113°39′22″W, el. 7,936 feet (2,419 m)
- Amphitheater Mountain, 48°35′59″N 113°29′15″W, el. 8,658 feet (2,639 m)
- Angel Wing, 48°45′27″N 113°42′41″W, el. 7,405 feet (2,257 m)
- Antelope Butte, 48°45′11″N 112°41′08″W, el. 4,472 feet (1,363 m)
- Apikuni Mountain, 48°50′11″N 113°39′14″W, el. 8,989 feet (2,740 m)
- Appistoki Peak, 48°28′04″N 113°21′15″W, el. 8,143 feet (2,482 m)
- Bad Marriage Mountain, 48°34′03″N 113°25′09″W, el. 8,340 feet (2,540 m)
- Bald Hill, 48°27′39″N 113°16′13″W, el. 5,587 feet (1,703 m)
- Basin Mountain, 48°33′04″N 113°21′48″W, el. 6,926 feet (2,111 m)
- Bear Mountain, 48°57′18″N 113°45′27″W, el. 8,829 feet (2,691 m)
- Bearhead Mountain, 48°25′27″N 113°21′21″W, el. 8,409 feet (2,563 m)
- Bishops Cap, 48°43′29″N 113°42′33″W, el. 8,881 feet (2,707 m)
- Bison Mountain, 48°27′55″N 113°18′38″W, el. 7,825 feet (2,385 m)
- Bushnell Hill, 48°59′54″N 112°56′37″W, el. 4,649 feet (1,417 m)
- Calf Robe Mountain, 48°23′15″N 113°19′57″W, el. 7,877 feet (2,401 m)
- Campbell Mountain, 48°58′41″N 113°56′19″W, el. 8,209 feet (2,502 m)
- Cataract Mountain, 48°43′30″N 113°40′49″W, el. 7,270 feet (2,220 m)
- Cathedral Peak, 48°52′08″N 113°51′58″W, el. 8,989 feet (2,740 m)
- Chalk Butte, 48°51′06″N 112°38′21″W, el. 4,318 feet (1,316 m)
- Chapman Peak, 48°57′47″N 114°01′26″W, el. 9,321 feet (2,841 m)
- Chief Lodgepole Peak, 48°25′51″N 113°25′29″W, el. 7,693 feet (2,345 m)
- Chief Mountain, 48°55′58″N 113°36′33″W, el. 9,006 feet (2,745 m)
- Citadel Mountain, 48°37′56″N 113°39′18″W, el. 8,993 feet (2,741 m)
- Citadel Peaks, 48°55′44″N 113°56′05″W, el. 8,040 feet (2,450 m)
- Cracker, 48°43′56″N 113°38′17″W, el. 9,816 feet (2,992 m)
- Crowfeet Mountain, 48°50′13″N 113°41′49″W, el. 8,750 feet (2,670 m)
- Crusher Hill, 48°57′15″N 113°29′56″W, el. 5,505 feet (1,678 m)
- Curly Bear Mountain, 48°39′32″N 113°27′21″W, el. 8,094 feet (2,467 m)
- Dancing Lady Mountain, 48°25′29″N 113°18′43″W, el. 7,339 feet (2,237 m)
- Divide Mountain, 48°39′55″N 113°24′03″W, el. 8,629 feet (2,630 m)
- Duckhead Buttes, 48°32′03″N 112°30′29″W, el. 4,167 feet (1,270 m)
- Dusty Star Mountain, 48°39′03″N 113°38′04″W, el. 7,985 feet (2,434 m)
- Eagle Plume Mountain, 48°33′11″N 113°25′03″W, el. 8,691 feet (2,649 m)
- Eagle Point, 48°53′47″N 112°44′52″W, el. 4,331 feet (1,320 m)
- East Flattop Mountain, 48°44′22″N 113°31′16″W, el. 8,359 feet (2,548 m)
- Flinsch Peak, 48°29′54″N 113°27′58″W, el. 9,216 feet (2,809 m)
- Fusillade Mountain, 48°38′25″N 113°43′21″W, el. 8,596 feet (2,620 m)
- Gable Mountain, 48°54′22″N 113°40′25″W, el. 9,255 feet (2,821 m)
- Goat Haunt Mountain, 48°57′03″N 113°50′55″W, el. 8,638 feet (2,633 m)
- Goat Mountain, 48°42′18″N 113°35′26″W, el. 8,569 feet (2,612 m)
- Going-to-the-Sun Mountain, 48°41′27″N 113°38′11″W, el. 9,603 feet (2,927 m)
- Headlight Butte, 48°47′23″N 112°18′36″W, el. 4,170 feet (1,270 m)
- Heavy Runner Mountain, 48°40′37″N 113°41′38″W, el. 7,956 feet (2,425 m)
- Hoodoo Hill, 48°46′55″N 113°01′25″W, el. 4,902 feet (1,494 m)
- Horsethief Ridge, 48°47′10″N 112°42′11″W, el. 4,603 feet (1,403 m)
- Houseman Hill, 48°42′23″N 113°05′58″W, el. 5,111 feet (1,558 m)
- Iceberg Peak, 48°48′52″N 113°45′36″W, el. 9,150 feet (2,790 m)
- Ipasha Peak, 48°51′06″N 113°47′11″W, el. 9,557 feet (2,913 m)
- Kaina Mountain, 48°57′14″N 113°47′55″W, el. 9,465 feet (2,885 m)
- Kakitos Mountain, 48°37′55″N 113°29′22″W, el. 7,779 feet (2,371 m)
- Kootenai Peak, 48°53′25″N 113°56′30″W, el. 8,524 feet (2,598 m)
- Kupunkamint Mountain, 48°37′06″N 113°25′18″W, el. 8,763 feet (2,671 m)
- Landslide Butte, 48°54′39″N 112°38′31″W, el. 4,655 feet (1,419 m)
- Little Chief Mountain, 48°38′41″N 113°35′42″W, el. 9,406 feet (2,867 m)
- Little Crown Butte, 48°46′13″N 112°44′21″W, el. 4,560 feet (1,390 m)
- Looking Glass Hill, 48°31′39″N 113°18′18″W, el. 6,083 feet (1,854 m)
- Love Rock, 48°54′22″N 112°32′53″W, el. 4,278 feet (1,304 m)
- Mad Wolf Mountain, 48°34′04″N 113°22′07″W, el. 8,327 feet (2,538 m)
- Mahtotopa Mountain, 48°39′06″N 113°34′09″W, el. 8,599 feet (2,621 m)
- Matahpi Peak, 48°42′24″N 113°38′21″W, el. 9,311 feet (2,838 m)
- McClintock Peak, 48°31′30″N 113°28′21″W, el. 8,264 feet (2,519 m)
- Medicine Owl Peak, 48°36′32″N 113°29′43″W, el. 8,268 feet (2,520 m)
- Miche Wabun Peak, 48°58′11″N 113°49′52″W, el. 8,855 feet (2,699 m)
- Mount Baldy, 48°19′07″N 113°09′14″W, el. 7,690 feet (2,340 m)
- Mount Cleveland, 48°55′30″N 113°50′53″W, el. 10,417 feet (3,175 m)
- Mount Ellsworth, 48°26′11″N 113°22′08″W, el. 8,573 feet (2,613 m)
- Mount Gould, 48°44′34″N 113°42′52″W, el. 9,527 feet (2,904 m)
- Mount Grinnell, 48°46′36″N 113°43′37″W, el. 8,812 feet (2,686 m)
- Mount Helen, 48°28′29″N 113°28′00″W, el. 8,520 feet (2,600 m)
- Mount Henkel, 48°49′18″N 113°41′00″W, el. 8,720 feet (2,660 m)
- Mount Henry, 48°27′12″N 113°20′36″W, el. 8,799 feet (2,682 m)
- Mount James, 48°35′04″N 113°29′32″W, el. 9,373 feet (2,857 m)
- Mount Kipp, 48°51′22″N 113°50′26″W, el. 8,812 feet (2,686 m)
- Mount Logan, 48°36′02″N 113°38′30″W, el. 9,226 feet (2,812 m)
- Mount Merritt, 48°52′13″N 113°47′11″W, el. 10,020 feet (3,050 m)
- Mount Morgan, 48°30′50″N 113°28′21″W, el. 8,704 feet (2,653 m)
- Mount Pablo, 48°19′10″N 113°11′30″W, el. 7,303 feet (2,226 m)
- Mount Siyeh, 48°43′45″N 113°38′59″W, el. 8,888 feet (2,709 m)
- Mount Wilbur, 48°48′20″N 113°44′21″W, el. 9,311 feet (2,838 m)
- Naoi Point, 48°47′08″N 113°29′20″W, el. 7,287 feet (2,221 m)
- Natoas Peak, 48°52′29″N 113°45′47″W, el. 9,252 feet (2,820 m)
- Never Laughs Mountain, 48°26′44″N 113°22′54″W, el. 7,611 feet (2,320 m)
- Olson Mountain, 48°57′26″N 113°56′15″W, el. 7,897 feet (2,407 m)
- Otokomi Mountain, 48°43′30″N 113°32′09″W, el. 7,913 feet (2,412 m)
- Painted Tepee Peak, 48°26′32″N 113°24′43″W, el. 7,592 feet (2,314 m)
- Papoose (summit), 48°55′12″N 113°37′42″W, el. 7,844 feet (2,391 m)
- Piegan Mountain, 48°42′37″N 113°41′18″W, el. 9,039 feet (2,755 m)
- Pollock Mountain, 48°43′01″N 113°42′09″W, el. 9,167 feet (2,794 m)
- Porcupine Ridge, 48°55′12″N 113°59′00″W, el. 9,128 feet (2,782 m)
- Pyramid Peak, 48°52′24″N 113°49′53″W, el. 8,159 feet (2,487 m)
- Red Blanket Butte, 48°35′32″N 113°15′19″W, el. 5,653 feet (1,723 m)
- Red Buttes, 48°49′31″N 112°55′06″W, el. 4,770 feet (1,450 m)
- Red Eagle Mountain, 48°39′16″N 113°32′55″W, el. 8,763 feet (2,671 m)
- Red Mountain, 48°32′08″N 113°25′27″W, el. 9,370 feet (2,860 m)
- Redhorn Peak, 48°51′54″N 114°00′23″W, el. 8,113 feet (2,473 m)
- Reynolds Mountain, 48°40′19″N 113°43′24″W, el. 8,747 feet (2,666 m)
- Rimrock Butte, 48°42′36″N 112°46′29″W, el. 4,318 feet (1,316 m)
- Rising Wolf Mountain, 48°29′46″N 113°24′58″W, el. 9,491 feet (2,893 m)
- Rocky Buttes, 48°50′05″N 112°32′23″W, el. 4,186 feet (1,276 m)
- Sarcee Mountain, 48°59′19″N 113°47′16″W, el. 8,350 feet (2,550 m)
- Scenic Point, 48°29′06″N 113°19′22″W, el. 7,310 feet (2,230 m)
- Sentinel Mountain, 48°58′45″N 113°44′44″W, el. 8,248 feet (2,514 m)
- Seward Mountain, 48°52′15″N 113°40′50″W, el. 8,894 feet (2,711 m)
- Shaheeya Peak, 48°57′21″N 113°58′23″W, el. 8,022 feet (2,445 m)
- Sherburne Peak, 48°53′01″N 113°33′43″W, el. 8,478 feet (2,584 m)
- Singleshot Mountain, 48°44′29″N 113°29′49″W, el. 7,923 feet (2,415 m)
- Sinopah Mountain, 48°27′48″N 113°24′44″W, el. 8,245 feet (2,513 m)
- Split Mountain, 48°35′53″N 113°32′21″W, el. 8,770 feet (2,670 m)
- Spot Mountain, 48°32′02″N 113°21′19″W, el. 7,828 feet (2,386 m)
- Square Butte, 48°44′43″N 112°49′17″W, el. 4,570 feet (1,390 m)
- Stoney Indian Peaks, 48°53′55″N 113°51′30″W, el. 8,861 feet (2,701 m)
- Summit Mountain, 48°21′14″N 113°22′11″W, el. 8,697 feet (2,651 m)
- Swiftcurrent Mountain, 48°47′09″N 113°46′00″W, el. 8,369 feet (2,551 m)
- The Guardhouse, 48°54′57″N 114°01′00″W, el. 9,331 feet (2,844 m)
- The Head, 48°28′14″N 113°17′58″W, el. 7,293 feet (2,223 m)
- The Sentinel, 48°55′30″N 114°00′53″W, el. 8,789 feet (2,679 m)
- Thunderbird Mountain, 48°56′01″N 114°02′45″W, el. 8,625 feet (2,629 m)
- Twin Buttes, 48°54′58″N 113°02′14″W, el. 4,905 feet (1,495 m)
- Wahcheechee Mountain, 48°52′59″N 113°52′28″W, el. 8,419 feet (2,566 m)
- West Flattop Mountain, 48°51′02″N 113°54′43″W, el. 6,821 feet (2,079 m)
- White Calf Mountain, 48°38′40″N 113°24′27″W, el. 8,855 feet (2,699 m)
- Whitecrow Mountain, 48°54′38″N 113°49′44″W, el. 7,247 feet (2,209 m)
- Wynn Mountain, 48°46′33″N 113°35′55″W, el. 8,396 feet (2,559 m)
- Yellow Mountain, 48°52′54″N 113°38′15″W, el. 8,756 feet (2,669 m)

== See also ==
- List of mountains in Montana
- List of mountain ranges in Montana
