= Apikuni Mountain =

Mountain in the state of Montana

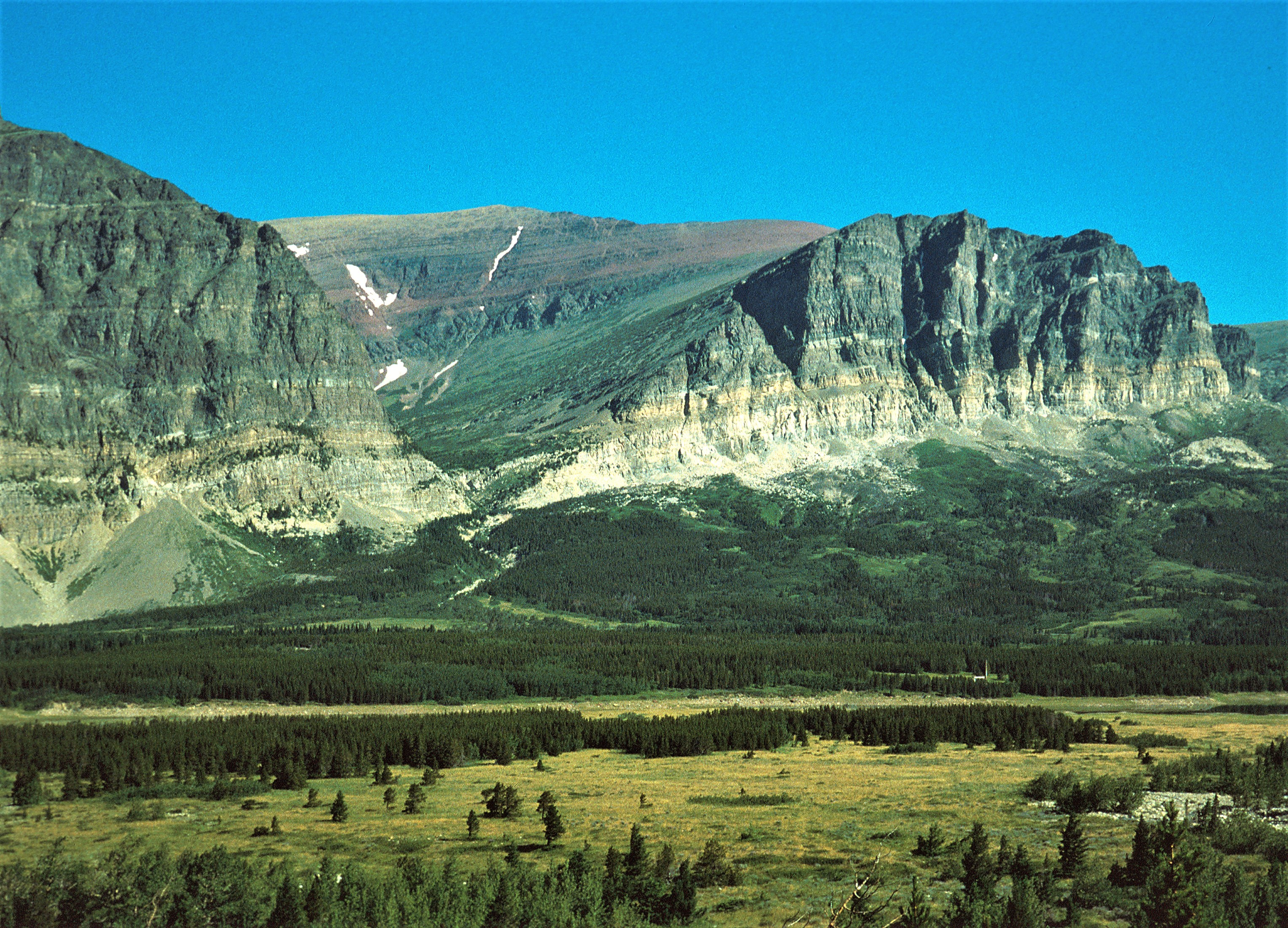
- South aspect

Highest point
- Elevation: 9,073 ft (2,765 m)
- Prominence: 1,468 ft (447 m)
- Parent peak: Gable Mountain
- Listing: Mountains in Glacier County, Montana
- Coordinates: 48°50′11″N 113°39′14″W

Geography
- Location within Montana Location within the United States
- Location: Glacier County, Montana, U.S.
- Parent range: Lewis Range
- Topo map: USGS Many Glacier MT

Apikuni Mountain (9,073 feet (2,765 m)) is located in the Lewis Range, Glacier National Park in the U.S. state of Montana.

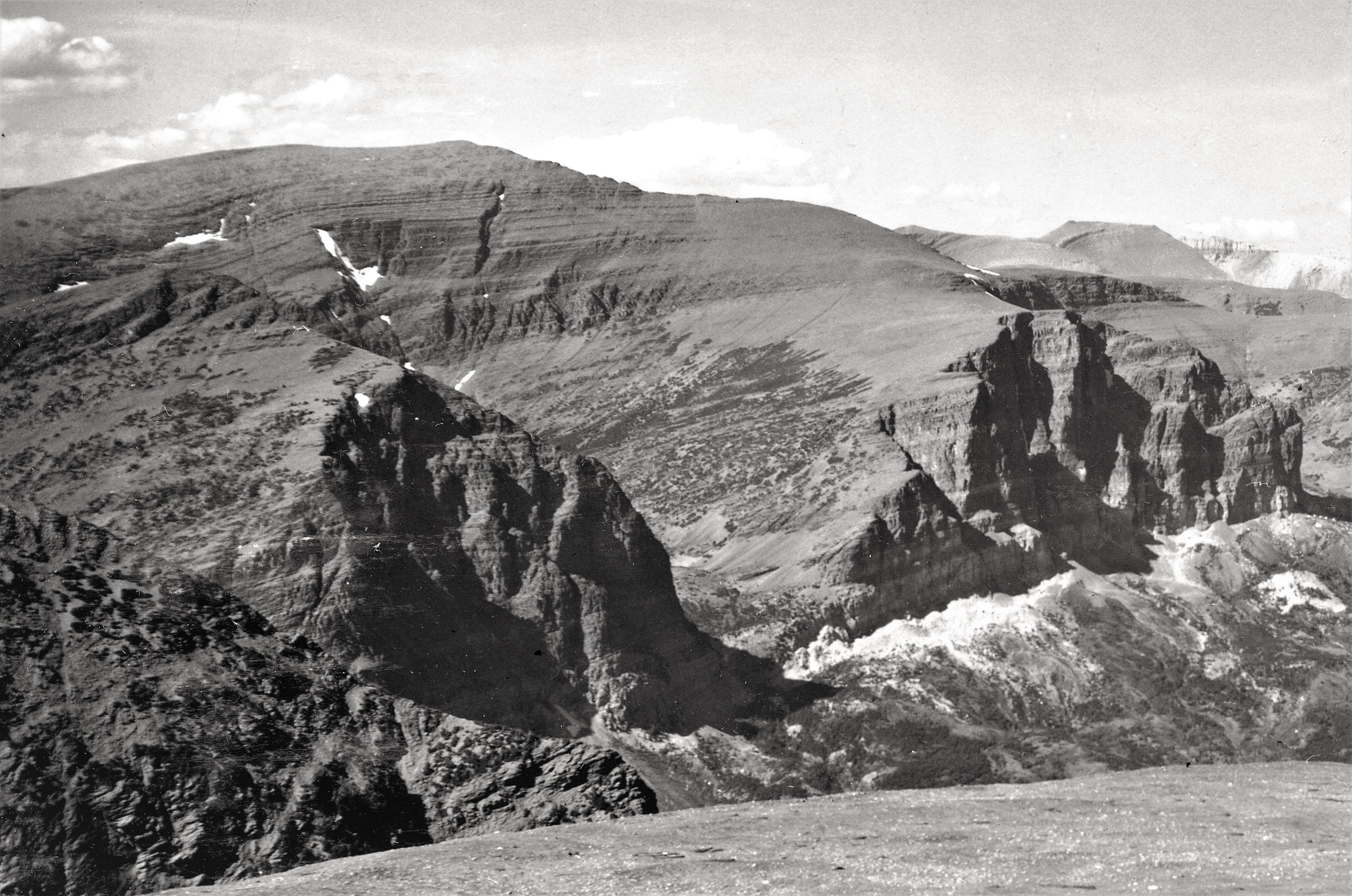
Apikuni Mountain in 1954

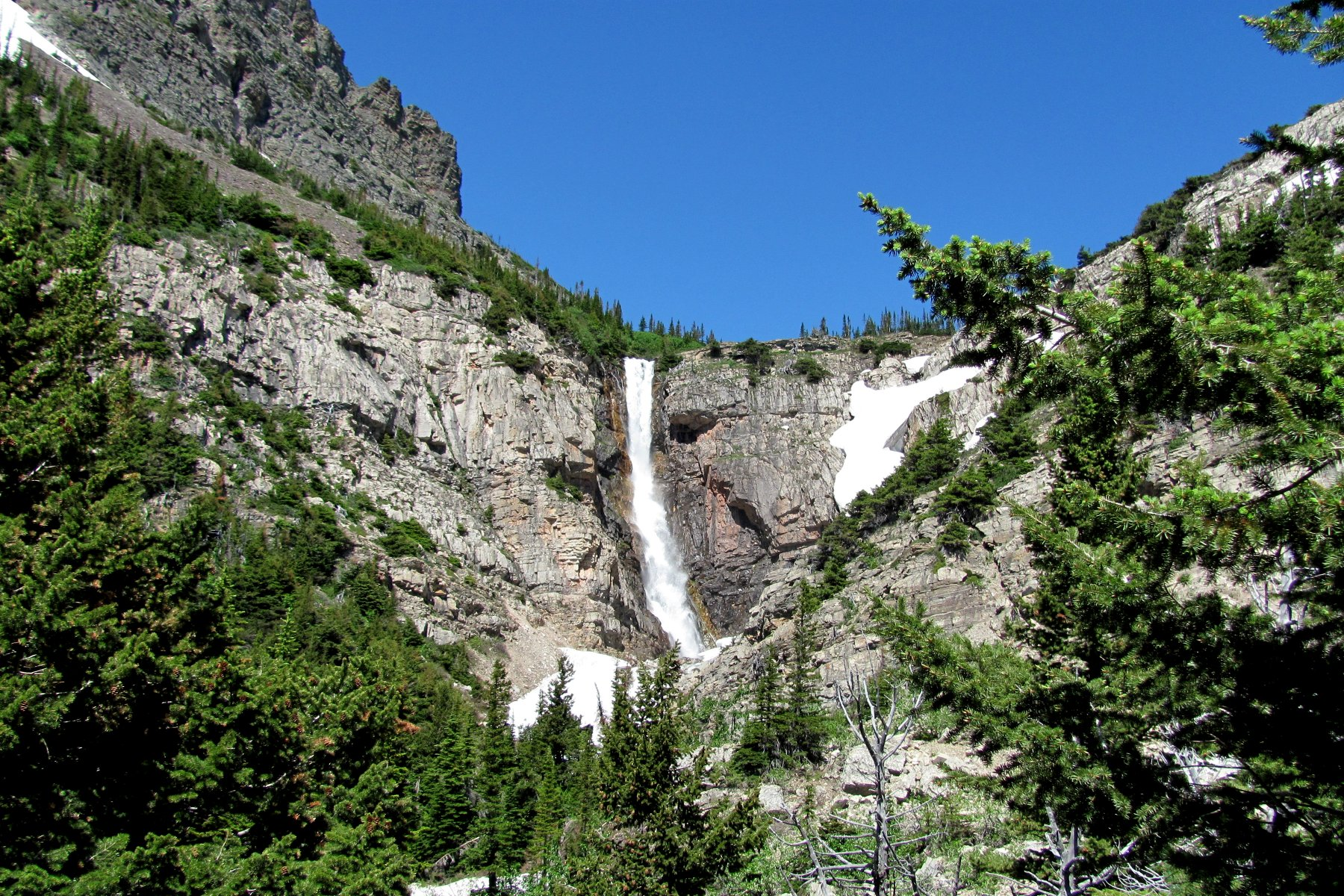
Apikuni Falls

== See also ==
- List of mountains and mountain ranges of Glacier National Park (U.S.)
