= Whitecrow Mountain =

Whitecrow Mountain may refer to

- Whitecrow Mountain (Canada) in Alberta/British Columbia
- Whitecrow Mountain (Montana) in Montana, United States
