= Almost-a-Dog Mountain =

Mountain in Montana, USA

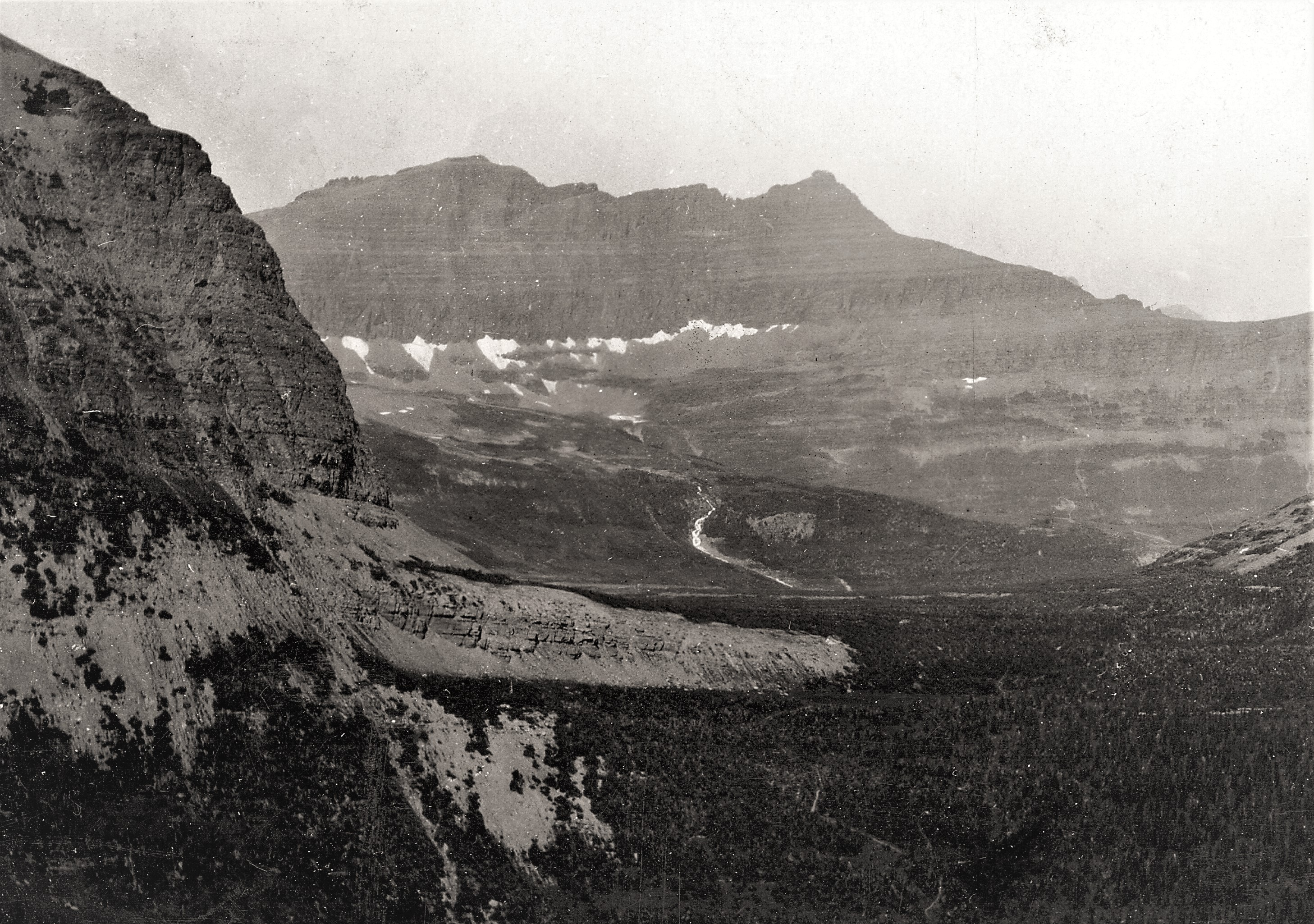
- South aspect, 1914

Highest point
- Elevation: 8,922 ft (2,719 m)
- Prominence: 1,023 ft (312 m)
- Parent peak: Little Chief Mountain
- Listing: Mountains in Glacier County, Montana
- Coordinates: 48°37′22″N 113°37′08″W

Geography
- Location within Montana Location within the United States
- Location: Glacier County, Montana, U.S.
- Parent range: Lewis Range
- Topo map: USGS Mount Stimson

Almost-a-Dog Mountain (8,922 ft (2,719 m)) is located in the Lewis Range, Glacier National Park in the U.S. state of Montana. The mountain is named for a Blackfoot warrior Almost A Dog or Imazí-imita who was a survivor of the 1870 Marias Massacre. Although his entire family perished in the attack, he survived but was crippled for life. He also survived the so-called Winter of Starvation in 1883–84.

== See also ==
- List of mountains and mountain ranges of Glacier National Park (U.S.)
