= Never Laughs Mountain =

Mountain in Montana, United States

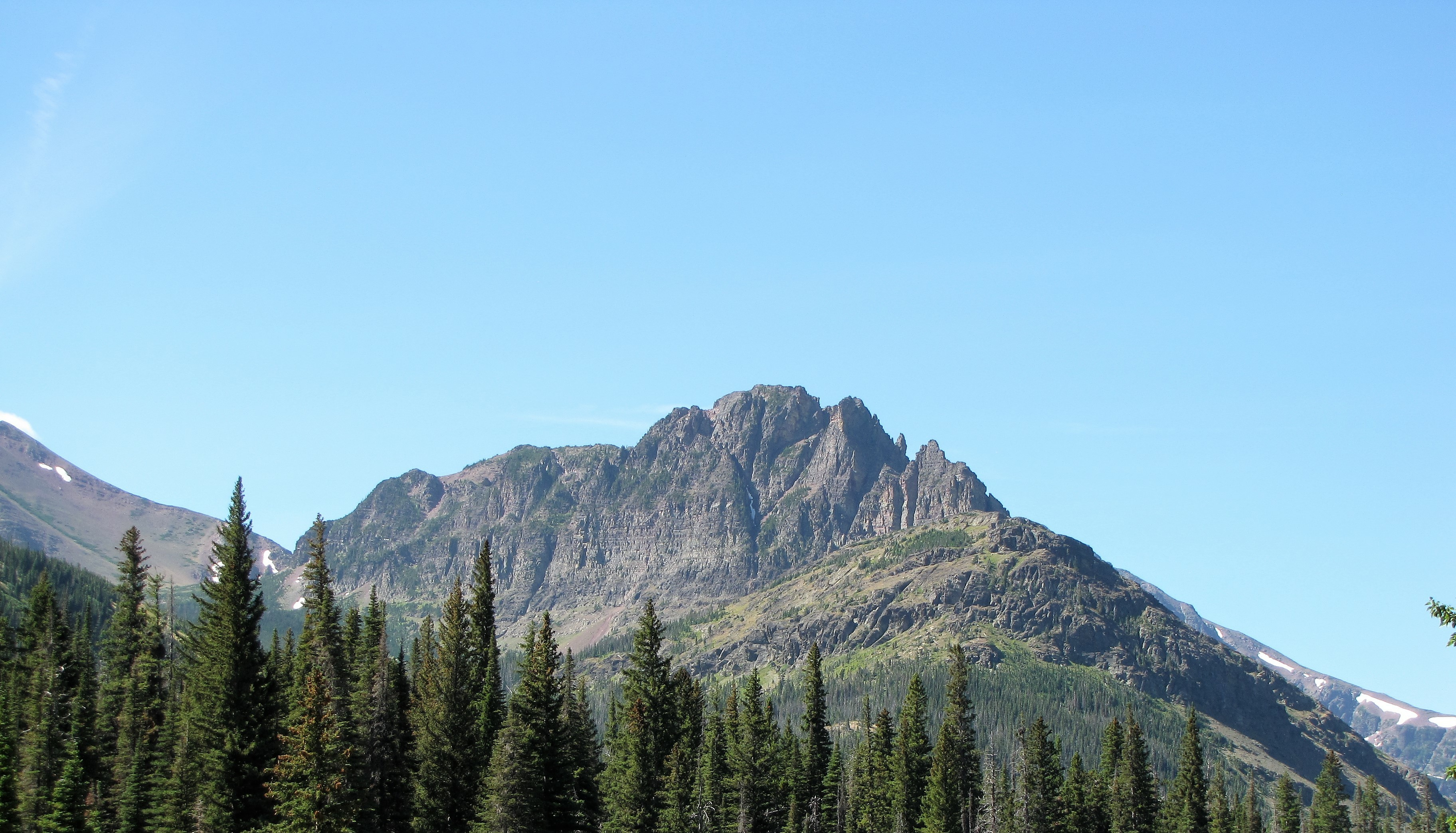
- Never Laughs Mountain from Two Medicine

Highest point
- Elevation: 7,641 ft (2,329 m)
- Prominence: 281 ft (86 m)
- Coordinates: 48°26′44″N 113°22′54″W

Geography
- Location within Montana Location within the United States
- Location: Glacier County, Montana, U.S.
- Parent range: Lewis Range
- Topo map: USGS Mount Rockwell MT

Climbing
- First ascent: Prehistoric
- Easiest route: Scramble class 2-3

Never Laughs Mountain (7,641 feet (2,329 m)) is located in the Lewis Range, Glacier National Park in the U.S. state of Montana. The mountain is likely named for the Blackfeet “Kat-aiyimi”, wording for never laughs, also the band of the Piegan Blackfeet. Never Laughs Mountain is easily seen to the south of Two Medicine Lake and is .59 mi (0.95 km) NW of Mount Ellsworth.

== See also ==
- Mountains and mountain ranges of Glacier National Park (U.S.)
