= Kakitos Mountain =

Mountain in Montana, United States

- Location within Montana Location within the United States

Highest point
- Elevation: 7,841 ft (2,390 m)
- Prominence: 601 ft (183 m)
- Coordinates: 48°37′56″N 113°29′22″W

Geography
- Location: Glacier County, Montana, U.S.
- Parent range: Lewis Range
- Topo map: USGS Saint Mary MT

Climbing
- First ascent: Unknown
- Easiest route: Hike

Kakitos Mountain (7,841 feet; 2,390 m) is located in the Lewis Range, Glacier National Park in the U.S. state of Montana. Kakitos Mountain is 1.63 miles (2.62 km) north of Medicine Owl Peak. Kakitos is the Blackfoot word for "star".

== See also ==
- Mountains and mountain ranges of Glacier National Park (U.S.)
