= Amphitheater Mountain (Montana) =

Mountain in the state of Montana

- Location within Montana Location within the United States

Highest point
- Elevation: 8,695 ft (2,650 m)
- Prominence: 530 ft (160 m)
- Parent peak: Mount James
- Listing: Mountains in Glacier County, Montana
- Coordinates: 48°35′59″N 113°29′15″W

Geography
- Location: Glacier County, Montana, U.S.
- Parent range: Lewis Range
- Topo map(s): USGS Cut Bank Pass, MT

Amphitheater Mountain (8,695 feet (2,650 m)) is located in the Lewis Range, Glacier National Park in the U.S. state of Montana. Amphitheater Mountain is a descriptive name given to the peak because of its resemblance to the Greek Amphitheater. The mountain's Blackfoot name is Three Horns or Niuóxkai-ozkina for a Blackfoot warrior who captured a Nez Perce woman as was able to live happily ever after. The mountain has also been named Whalen Mountain for a former park ranger.

== See also ==
- List of mountains and mountain ranges of Glacier National Park (U.S.)
