= Blackrock Mountain (disambiguation) =

Blackrock Mountain can refer to:

- Blackrock Mountain (Alberta), in the Canadian Rockies in Alberta
- Black Rock Mountain (Arizona), in Mohave County, northwest Arizona
- Blackrock Mountain (Canada), a mountain on the Continental Divide on the British Columbia-Alberta border in Canada
- Black Rock Mountain State Park, Georgia, United States
- Black Rock Mountain, County Wexford, Ireland
- Black Rock, Co. Limerick, Ireland
  - "Blackrock Mountain", an expansion to the video game Hearthstone, set in the Warcraft universe.
