= Curly Bear Mountain =

Mountain in the state of Montana

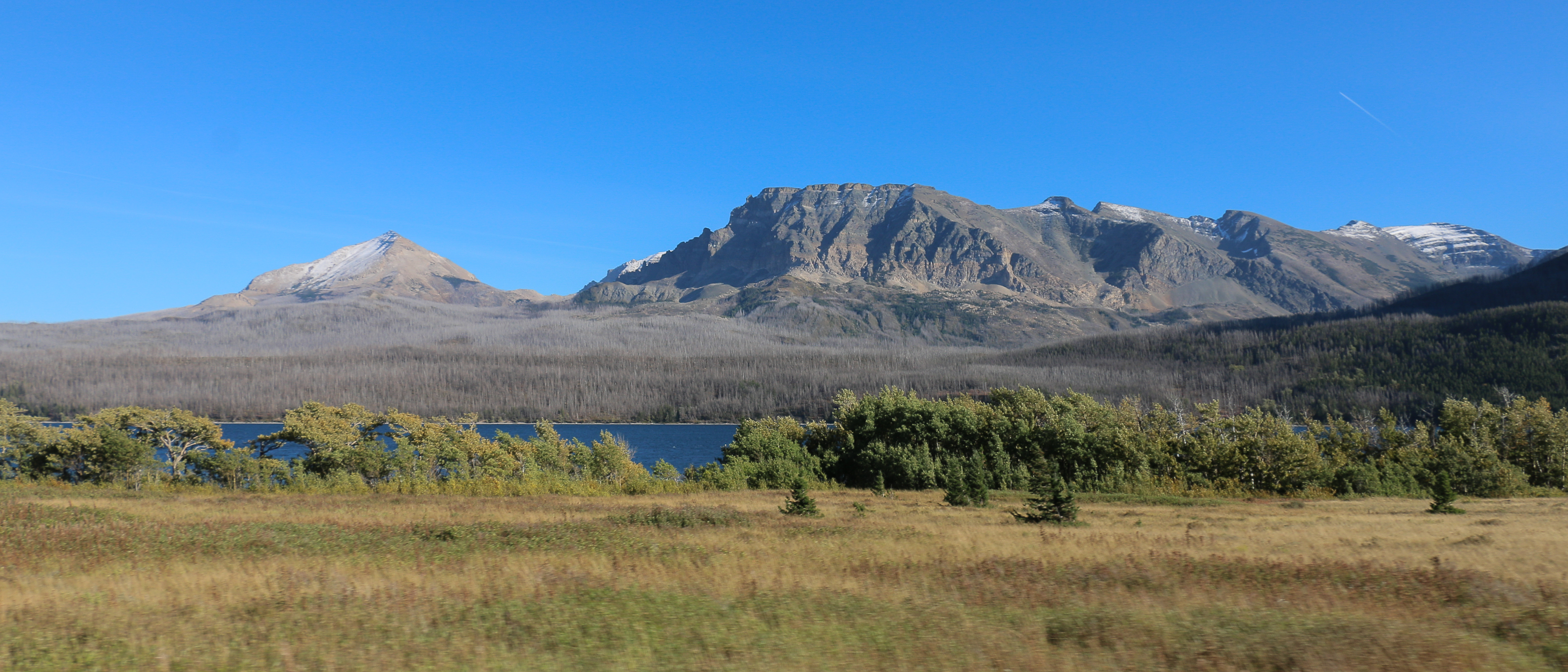
- Divide Mountain at left and Curly Bear Mountain on the right

Highest point
- Elevation: 8,099 ft (2,469 m)
- Prominence: 299 ft (91 m)
- Coordinates: 48°39′32″N 113°27′22″W

Geography
- Location within Montana Location within the United States
- Location: Glacier County, Montana, U.S.
- Parent range: Lewis Range
- Topo map: USGS Saint Mary MT

Climbing
- First ascent: Unknown
- Easiest route: Scramble class 2-3

Curly Bear Mountain (8,099 feet (2,469 m)) is located in the Lewis Range, Glacier National Park in the U.S. state of Montana. Curly Bear Mountain is easily seen from the village of Saint Mary, Montana rising just west of Divide Mountain. The peak was named after Blackfoot warrior and historian Curly Bear (Kyáiyo-xusi).

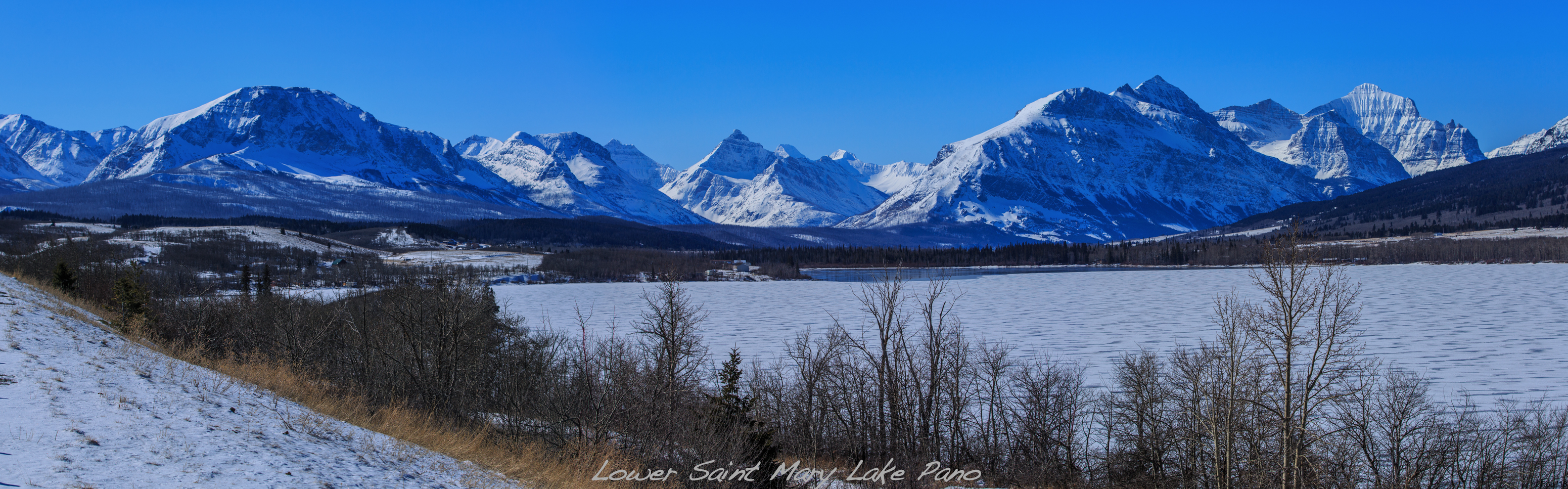
Lower Saint Mary Lake with Curly Bear to left side (see annotations)

== See also ==
- Mountains and mountain ranges of Glacier National Park (U.S.)
