= Whitecrow Mountain (Montana) =

Mountain in the state of Montana

- Location within Montana Location within the United States

Highest point
- Elevation: 7,824 ft (2,385 m)
- Prominence: 125 ft (38 m)
- Listing: Mountains in Glacier County, Montana; Mountains of Glacier National Park
- Coordinates: 48°54′37″N 113°49′48″W

Geography
- Country: United States
- State: Montana
- County: Glacier County
- Protected area: Glacier National Park
- Parent range: Lewis Range
- Topo map: USGS Mount Cleveland

Whitecrow Mountain is located in the Lewis Range, Glacier National Park in the U.S. state of Montana.

== See also ==
- List of mountains and mountain ranges of Glacier National Park (U.S.)
