= Crowfeet Mountain =

Mountain in the state of Montana

- Location within Montana Location within the United States

Highest point
- Elevation: 8,914 ft (2,717 m) NAVD 88
- Prominence: 994 ft (303 m)
- Coordinates: 48°50′13″N 113°41′49″W

Geography
- Location: Glacier County, Montana, U.S.
- Parent range: Lewis Range
- Topo map(s): USGS Many Glacier, MT

Crowfeet Mountain (8,914 feet (2,717 m)) is located in the Lewis Range, Glacier National Park in the U.S. state of Montana. Crowfeet Mountain is situated on a ridgeline just south of the Ptarmigan Tunnel and is easily seen from Iceberg Lake to the southwest.

== See also ==
- Mountains and mountain ranges of Glacier National Park (U.S.)
