= Little Chief Mountain =

Mountain in Montana, U.S.

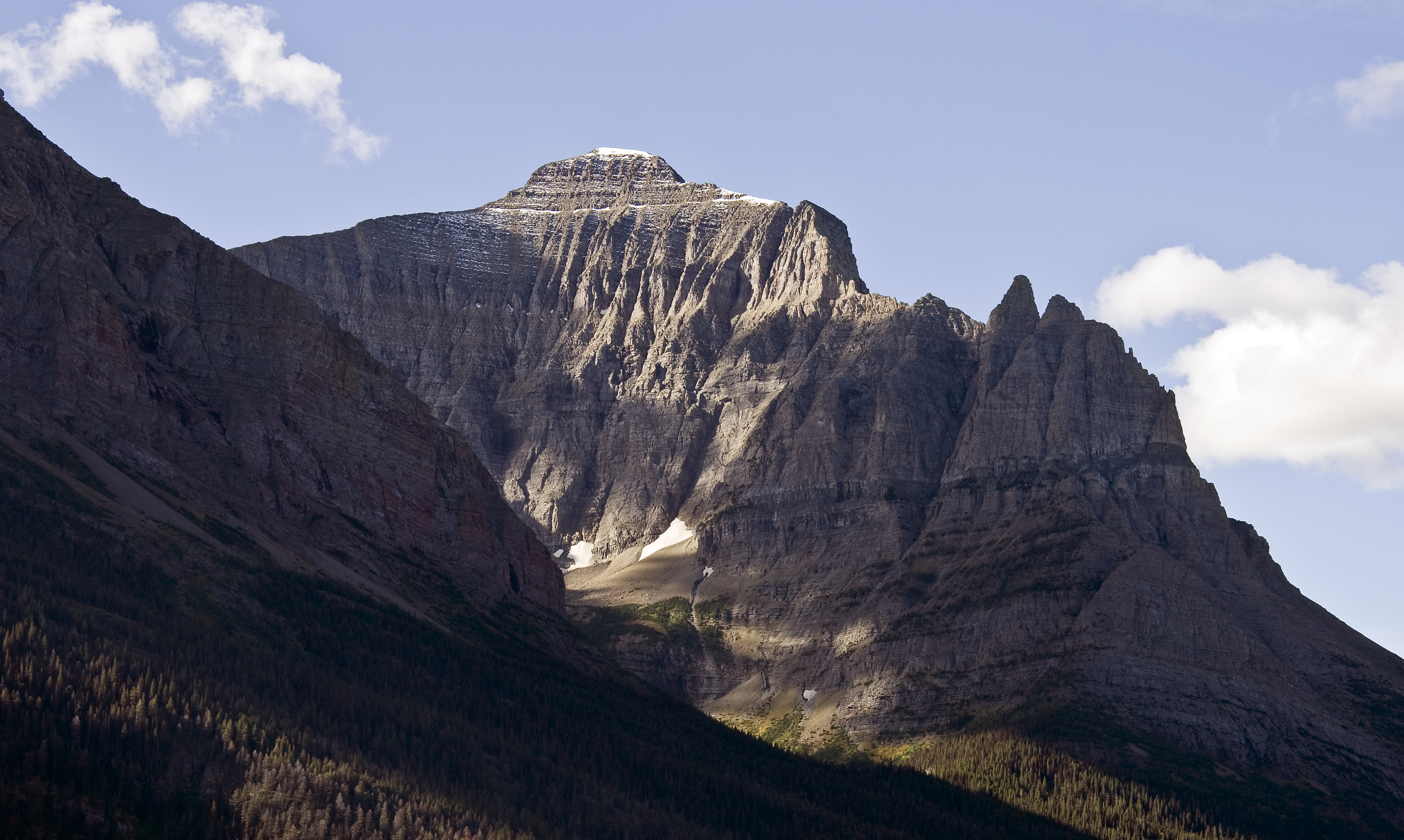
- Little Chief Mountain, northeast aspect

Highest point
- Elevation: 9,546 ft (2,910 m)
- Prominence: 1,781 ft (543 m)
- Parent peak: Blackfoot Mountain
- Listing: Mountains in Glacier County, Montana
- Coordinates: 48°38′41″N 113°35′42″W

Geography
- Location within Montana Location within the United States
- Location: Glacier County, Montana, U.S.
- Parent range: Lewis Range
- Topo map(s): USGS Rising Sun, MT

Climbing
- First ascent: 1894 (Henry L. Stimson)

Little Chief Mountain (9,546 feet (2,910 m)) is located in the Lewis Range, Glacier National Park in the U.S. state of Montana. Little Chief Mountain is easily seen from the Going-to-the-Sun Road, rising to the south of Saint Mary Lake. Little Chief Mountain was named in 1887 by George Bird Grinnell for his friend, Frank North, U.S. Army. "Little Chief" was his Pawnee name, given to him by his Pawnee Scouts.

== Climate ==
Based on the Köppen climate classification, Little Chief Mountain is located in a subarctic climate zone characterized by long, usually very cold winters, and short, cool to mild summers. Winter temperatures can drop below −10 °F with wind chill factors below −30 °F.

== Geology ==
Like other mountains in Glacier National Park, Little Chief Mountain is composed of sedimentary rock laid down during the Precambrian to Jurassic periods. Formed in shallow seas, this sedimentary rock was initially uplifted beginning 170 million years ago when the Lewis Overthrust fault pushed an enormous slab of precambrian rocks 3 mi (4.8 km) thick, 50 miles (80 km) wide and 160 miles (260 km) long over younger rock of the cretaceous period.

== Gallery ==
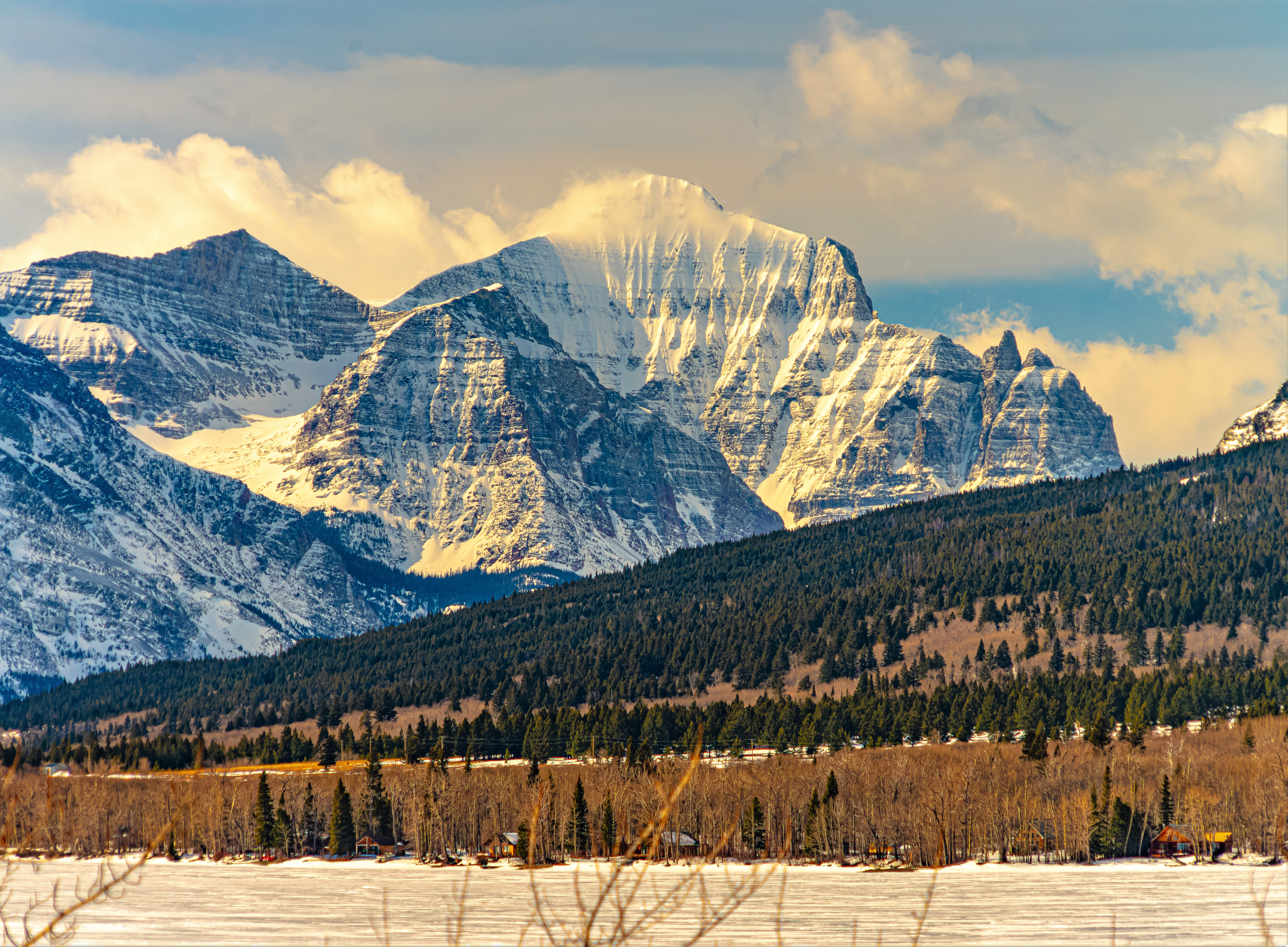
Northeast aspect of Little Chief Mountain.
(Mahtotopa Mountain to left).

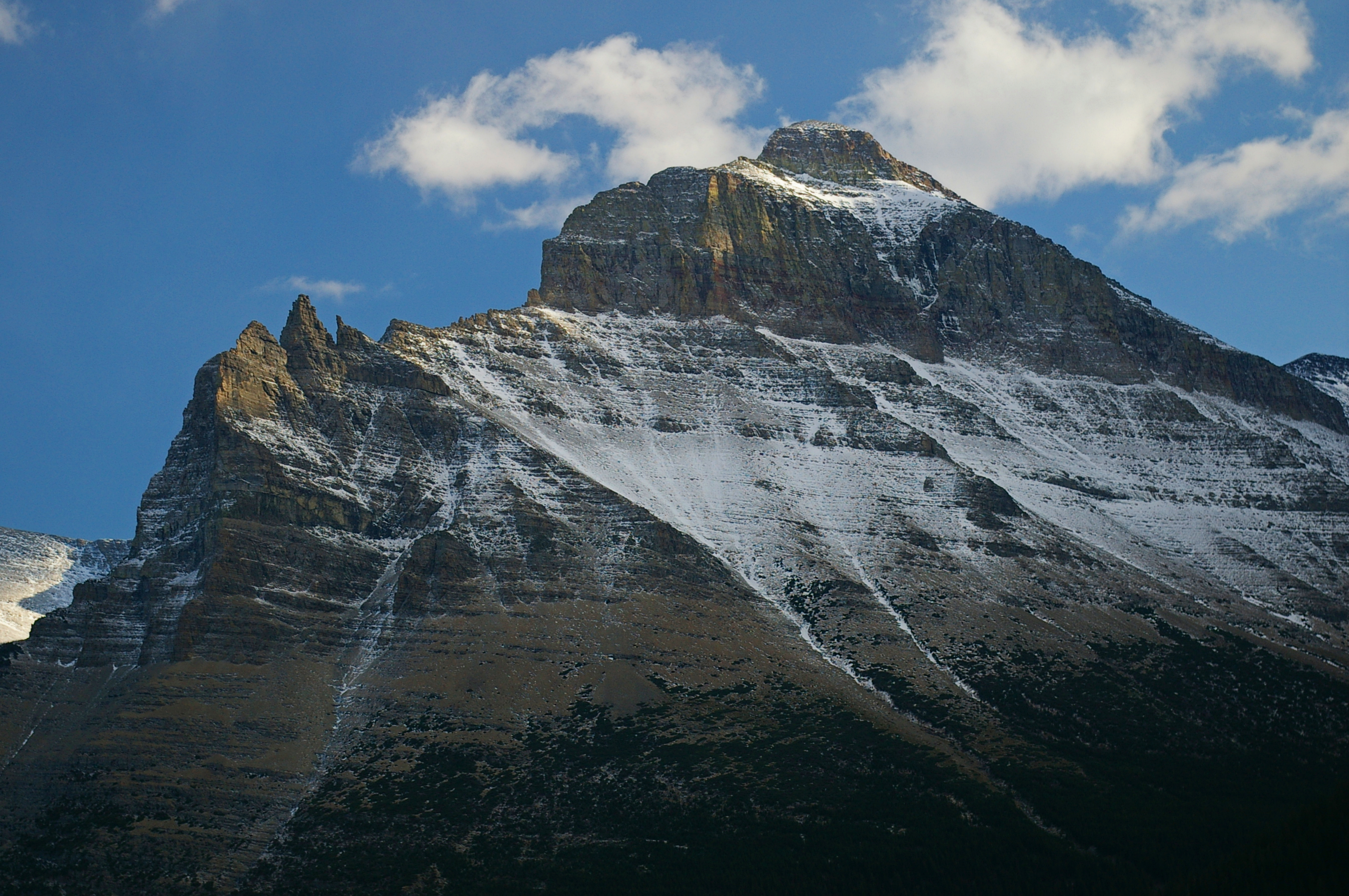
Little Chief, northwest aspect

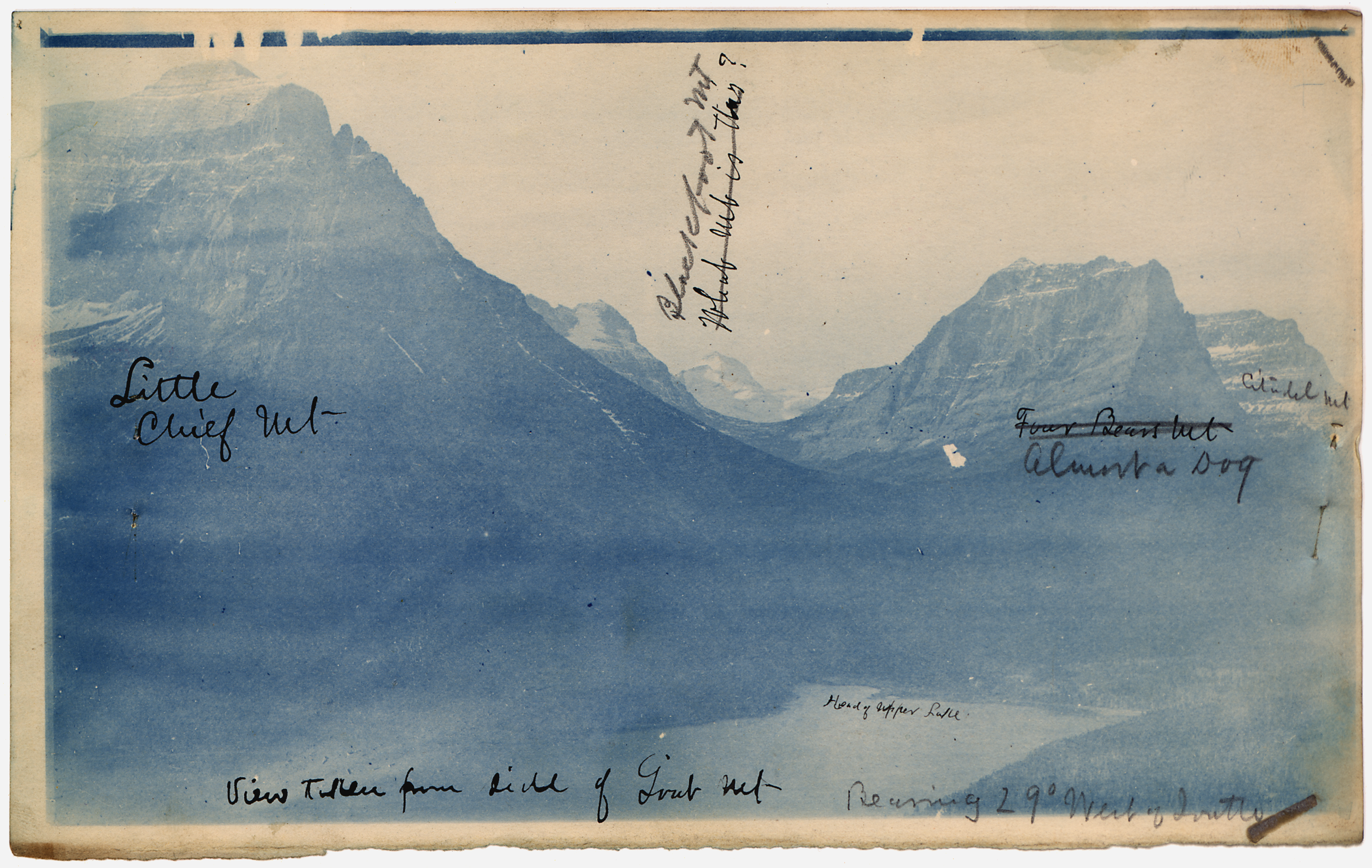
Little Chief Mountain, Blackfoot Mountain, and Citadel Mountain, viewed from Goat Mountain

== See also ==
- List of mountains and mountain ranges of Glacier National Park (U.S.)
- Geology of the Rocky Mountains
