= Heavy Runner Mountain =

Mountain in Montana, United States

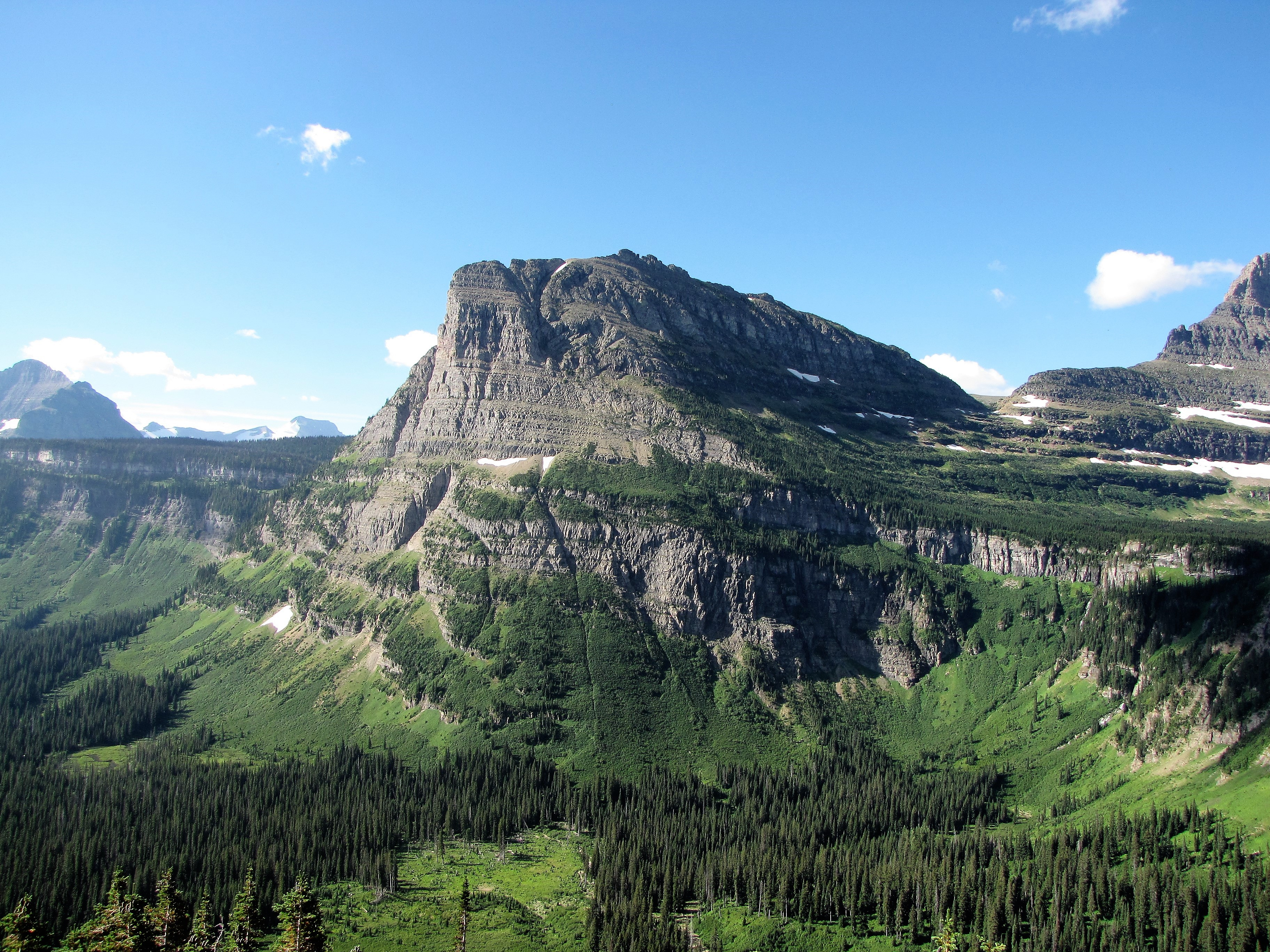
- Heavy Runner Mountain as seen from the Going-to-the-Sun Road

Highest point
- Elevation: 8,016 ft (2,443 m)
- Prominence: 767 ft (234 m)
- Coordinates: 48°40′36″N 113°41′41″W

Geography
- Location within Montana Location within the United States
- Location: Glacier County, Montana, U.S.
- Parent range: Lewis Range
- Topo map: USGS Logan Pass MT

Climbing
- First ascent: Unknown
- Easiest route: Scramble class 2-3

Heavy Runner Mountain (8,016 feet (2,443 m)) is located in the Lewis Range, Glacier National Park in the U.S. state of Montana. The summit is a little over a mile east-northeast of Reynolds Mountain and is easily seen from the Going-to-the-Sun Road as well as Logan Pass. The mountain is named for the Blackfeet Indian Chief, Heavy Runner, who was massacred along with most of his encampment by Col. Eugene M. Baker's detachment on the Marias River on January 23, 1870.

== Climate ==
Based on the Köppen climate classification, Heavy Runner Mountain is located in a subarctic climate characterized by long, usually very cold winters, and short, cool to mild summers. Temperatures can drop below −10 °F with wind chill factors below −30 °F.

== Geology ==
Like other mountains in Glacier National Park, Heavy Runner Mountain is composed of sedimentary rock laid down during the Precambrian to Jurassic periods. Formed in shallow seas, this sedimentary rock was initially uplifted beginning 170 million years ago when the Lewis Overthrust fault pushed an enormous slab of precambrian rocks 3 mi (4.8 km) thick, 50 miles (80 km) wide and 160 miles (260 km) long over younger rock of the cretaceous period.

== See also ==
- List of mountains and mountain ranges of Glacier National Park (U.S.)
- Geology of the Rocky Mountains

== Gallery ==
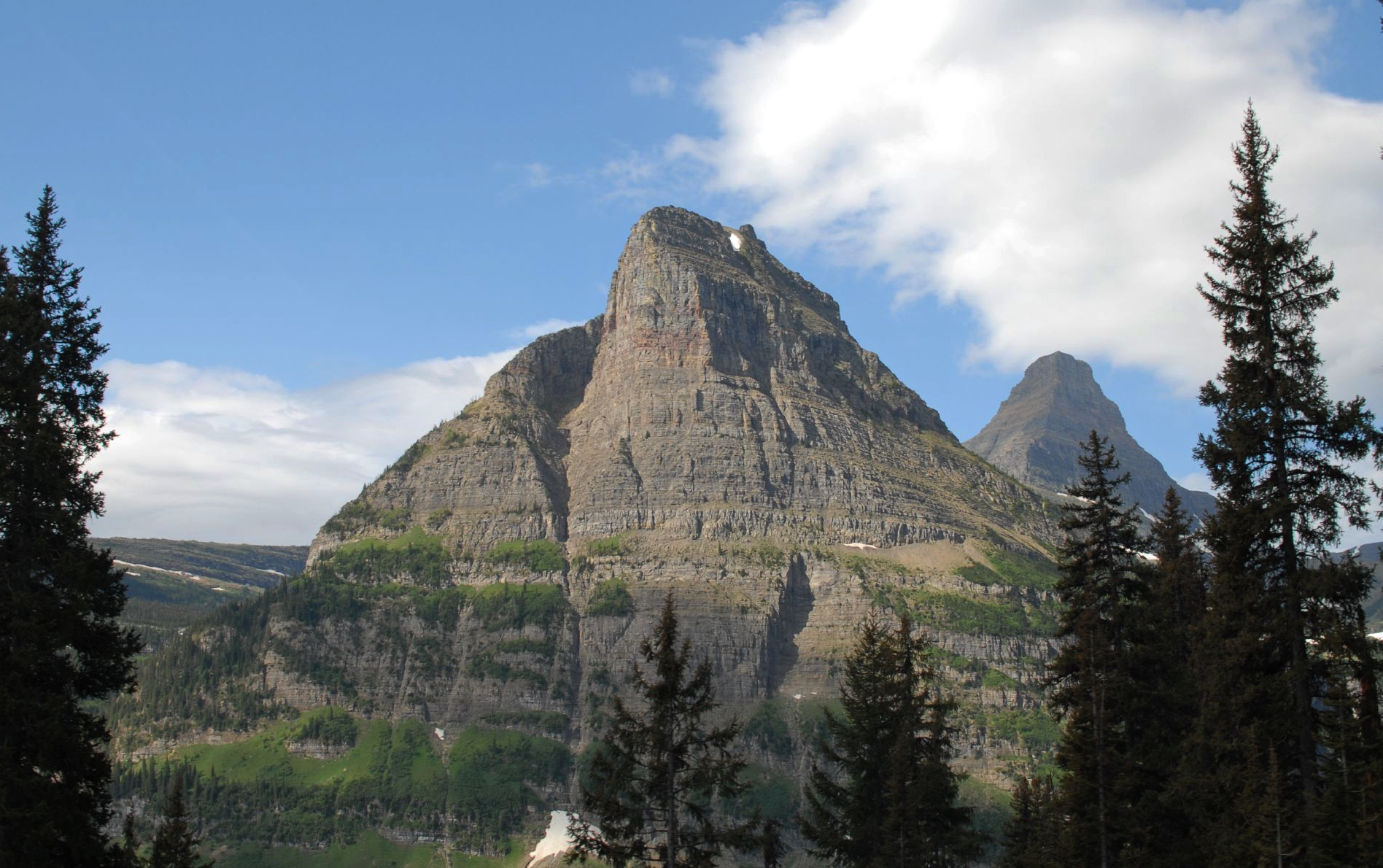
Heavy Runner Mountain with Reynolds Mountain behind

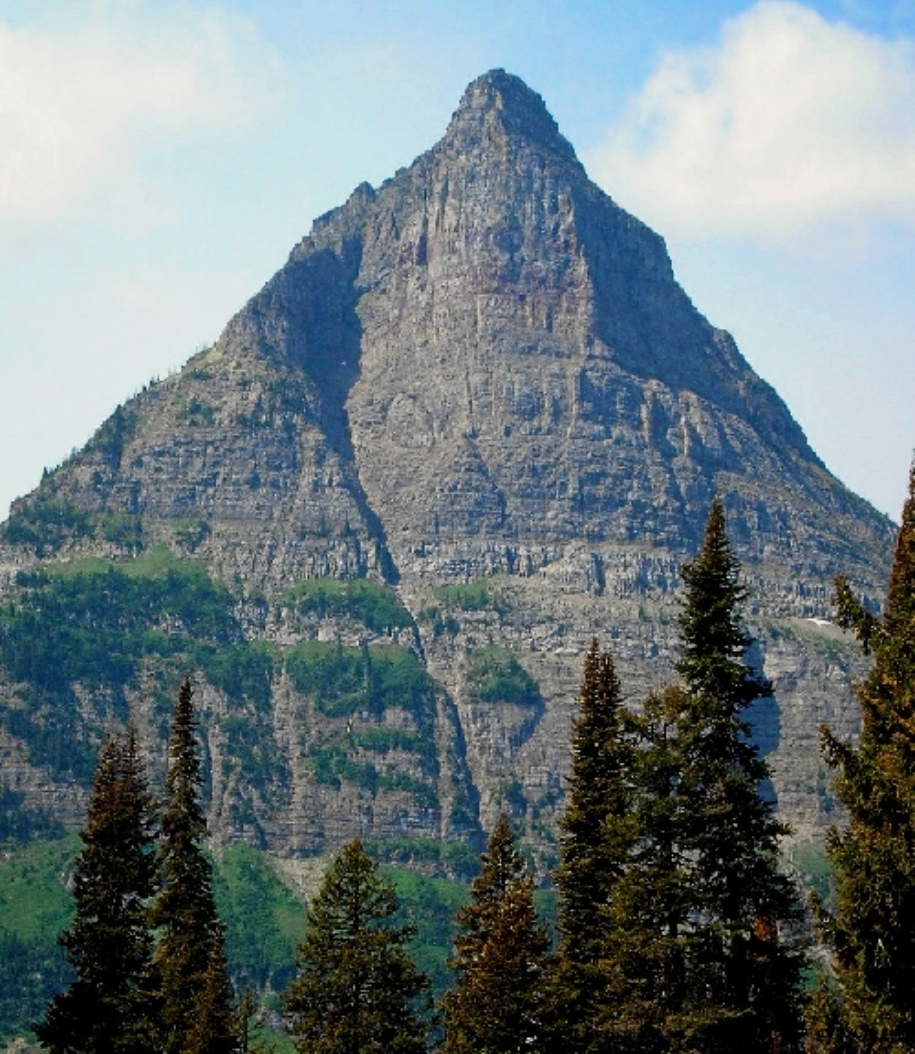
Heavy Runner from the east
