= Cataract Mountain =

Mountain in Montana, United States

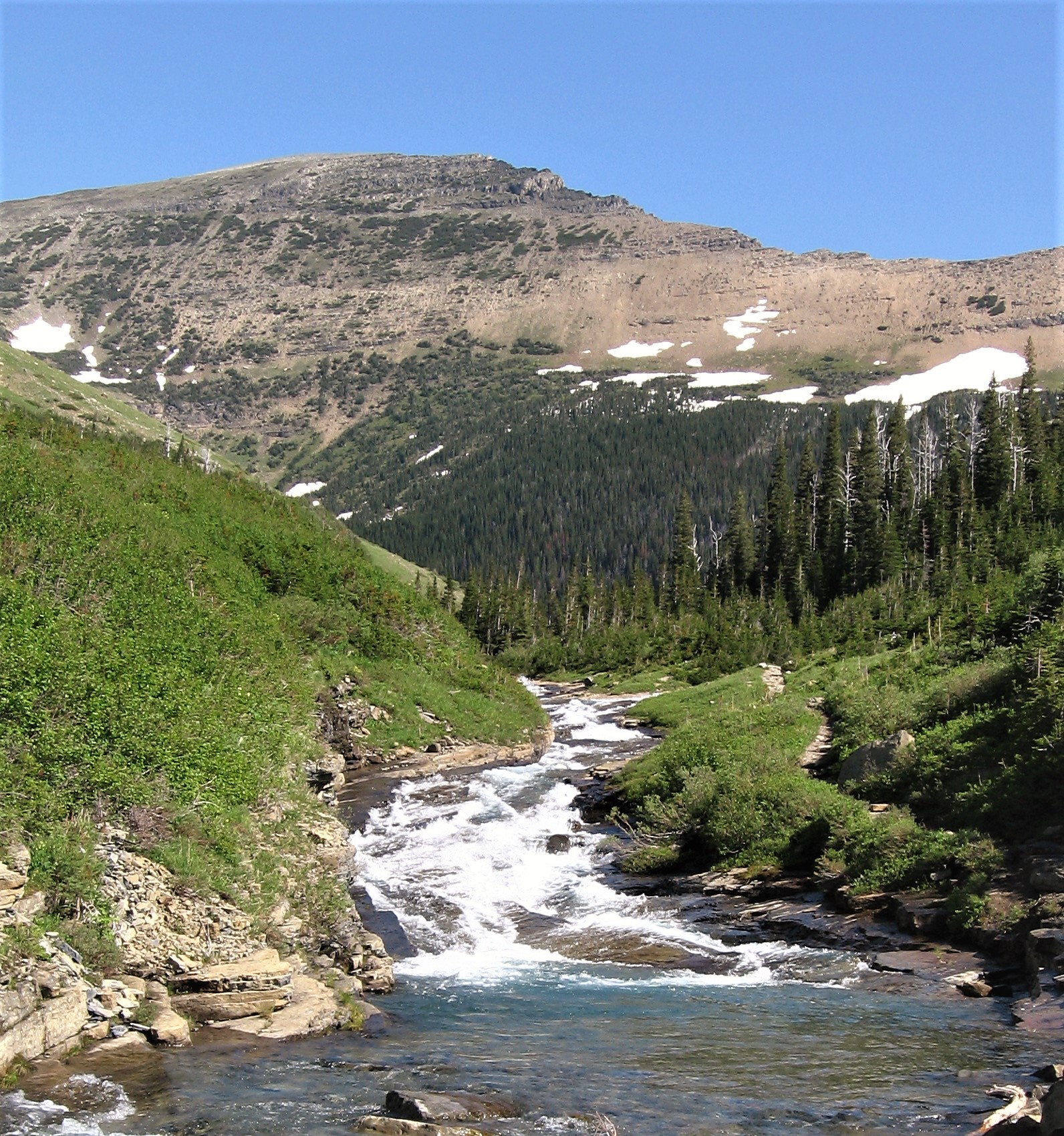
- South aspect, with Siyeh Creek

Highest point
- Elevation: 8,180 ft (2,490 m)
- Prominence: 610 ft (190 m)
- Coordinates: 48°43′29″N 113°40′55″W

Geography
- Location within Montana Location within the United States
- Location: Glacier County, Montana, U.S.
- Parent range: Lewis Range
- Topo map: USGS Logan Pass MT

Climbing
- First ascent: Unknown
- Easiest route: class 3

Cataract Mountain (8,180 feet (2,493 m)) is located in the Lewis Range, Glacier National Park in the U.S. state of Montana. Cataract Mountain is .70 miles (1.13 km) NNE of Piegan Mountain and more than a mile west of Mount Siyeh.

== Climate ==
Based on the Köppen climate classification, it is located in an alpine subarctic climate zone with long, cold, snowy winters, and cool to warm summers. Temperatures can drop below −10 °F with wind chill factors below −30 °F.

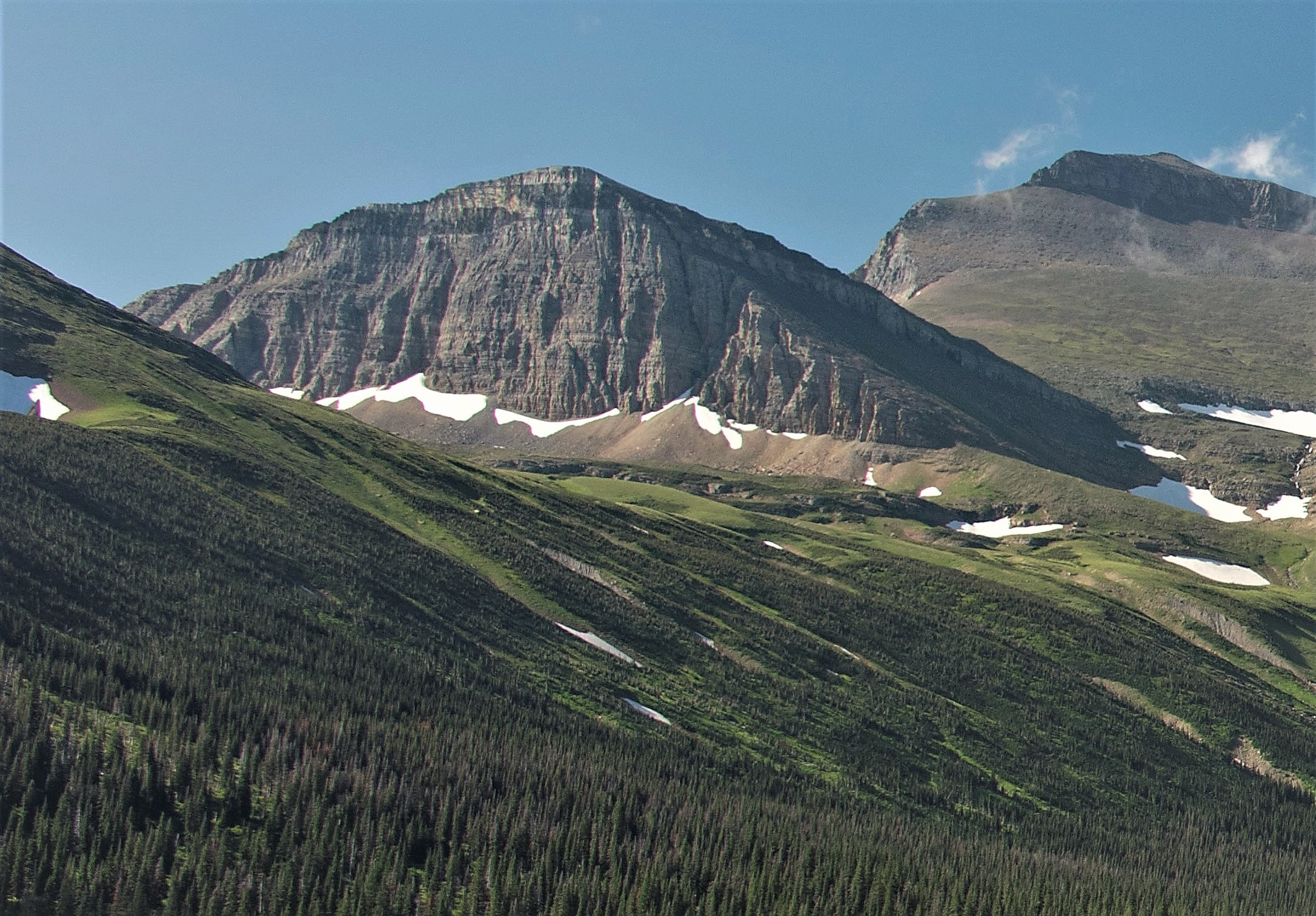
North aspect centered, with Piegan Mountain upper right. Viewed from Grinnell Glacier Trail.

== Geology ==
Like other mountains in Glacier National Park, it is composed of sedimentary rock laid down during the Precambrian to Jurassic periods. Formed in shallow seas, this sedimentary rock was initially uplifted beginning 170 million years ago when the Lewis Overthrust fault pushed an enormous slab of precambrian rocks 3 mi (4.8 km) thick, 50 miles (80 km) wide and 160 miles (260 km) long over younger rock of the cretaceous period.

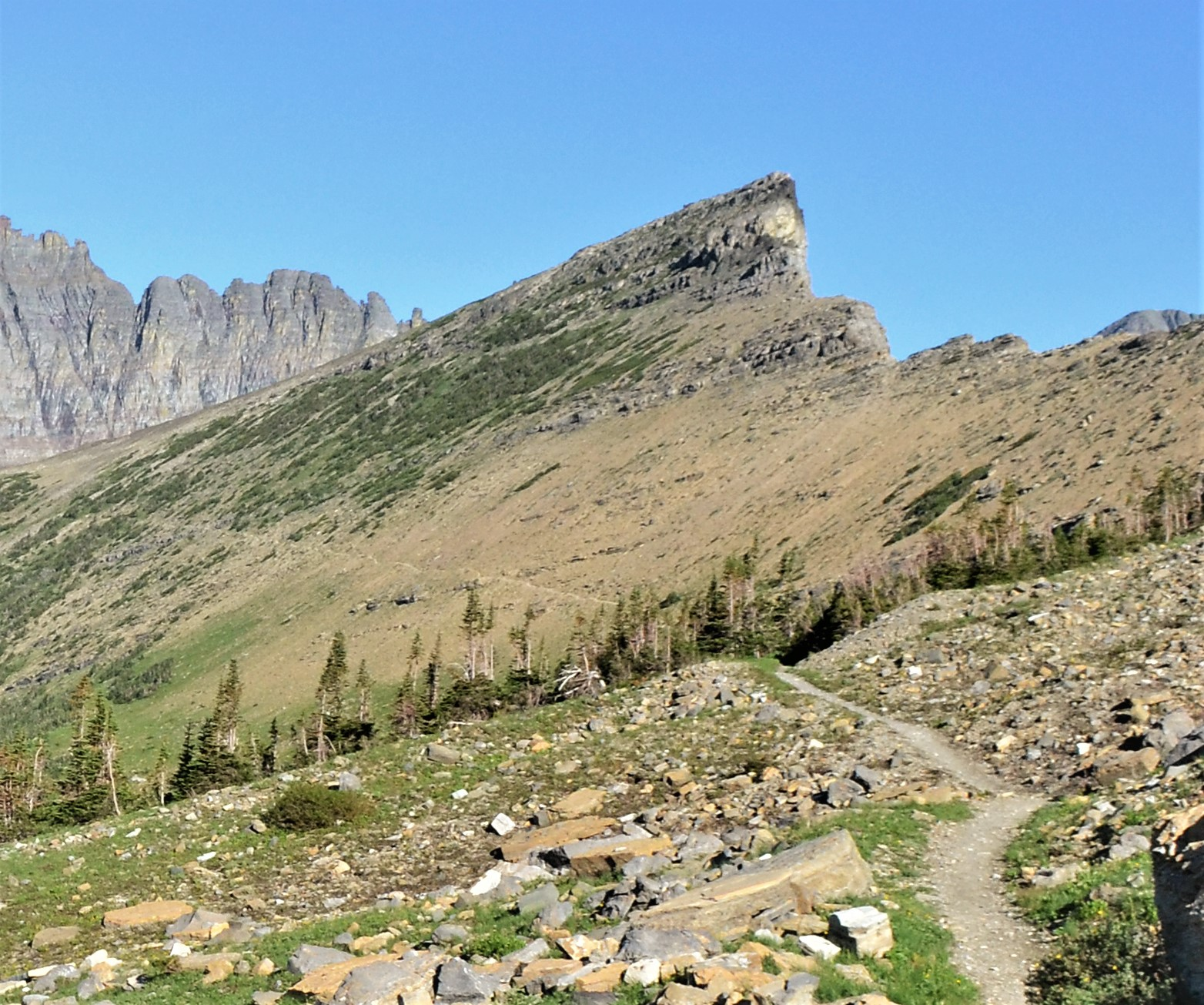
Cataract Mountain from ESE along Piegan Pass Trail

== See also ==
- Mountains and mountain ranges of Glacier National Park (U.S.)
