= Painted Tepee Peak =

Mountain in Montana, US

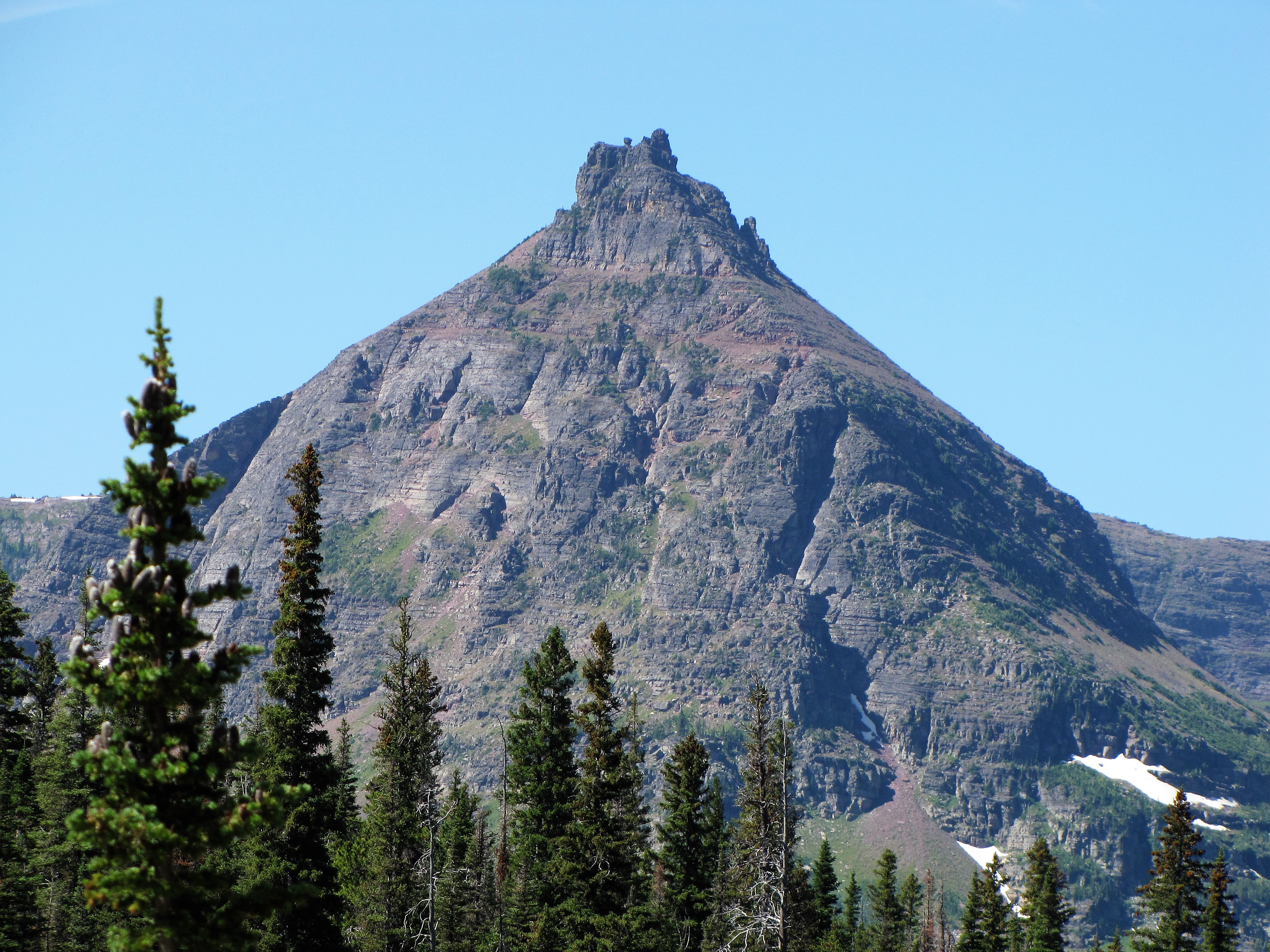
- Painted Tepee Peak, June 2017

Highest point
- Elevation: 7,650 ft (2,330 m)
- Coordinates: 48°26′32″N 113°24′43″W

Geography
- Location within Montana
- Location: Glacier County, Montana, U.S.
- Topo map(s): USGS Cut Bank Pass, MT

Painted Tepee Peak, or simply Painted Tepee (also Tipi or Teepee) is a mountain located in Glacier National Park in the U.S. state of Montana near the Two Medicine Pass. The altitude of the highest point is 7,650 feet (2,332 m). (Note: The US Geological Survey placed the altitude in 1908 at 7,600 feet (2,316 m)) The summit lies to the south of Two Medicine Lake, and is within view of Grizzly Mountain, Chief Lodgepole Peak, and Mount Rockwell. The mountain lies along the Two Mountain Pass Trail.

== See also ==
- List of mountains in Glacier County, Montana
- List of mountains and mountain ranges of Glacier National Park (U.S.)
- List of trails of Glacier County, Montana
