= Split Mountain (Montana) =

Mountain in Montana, United States

- Southeast aspect

Highest point
- Elevation: 8,797 ft (2,681 m)
- Prominence: 1,272 ft (388 m)
- Parent peak: Norris Mountain (8,882 ft)
- Isolation: 1.50 mi (2.41 km)
- Coordinates: 48°35′53″N 113°32′21″W

Geography
- Location within Montana Location within the United States
- Location: Glacier National Park; Glacier County, Montana, U.S.
- Parent range: Lewis Range
- Topo map(s): USGS Mount Stimson, MT

Climbing
- First ascent: 1956
- Easiest route: class 5+

Split Mountain (8,797 feet (2,681 m)) is located in the Lewis Range, Glacier National Park in the U.S. state of Montana.

== Geology ==
Like other mountains in Glacier National Park, Split Mountain is composed of sedimentary rock laid down during the Precambrian to Jurassic periods. Formed in shallow seas, this sedimentary rock was initially uplifted beginning 170 million years ago when the Lewis Overthrust fault pushed an enormous slab of precambrian rocks 3 mi (4.8 km) thick, 50 miles (80 km) wide and 160 miles (260 km) long over younger rock of the cretaceous period.

== Climate ==
Based on the Köppen climate classification, it is located in an alpine subarctic climate zone with long, cold, snowy winters, and cool to warm summers. Temperatures can drop below −10 °F with wind chill factors below −30 °F.

== Gallery ==
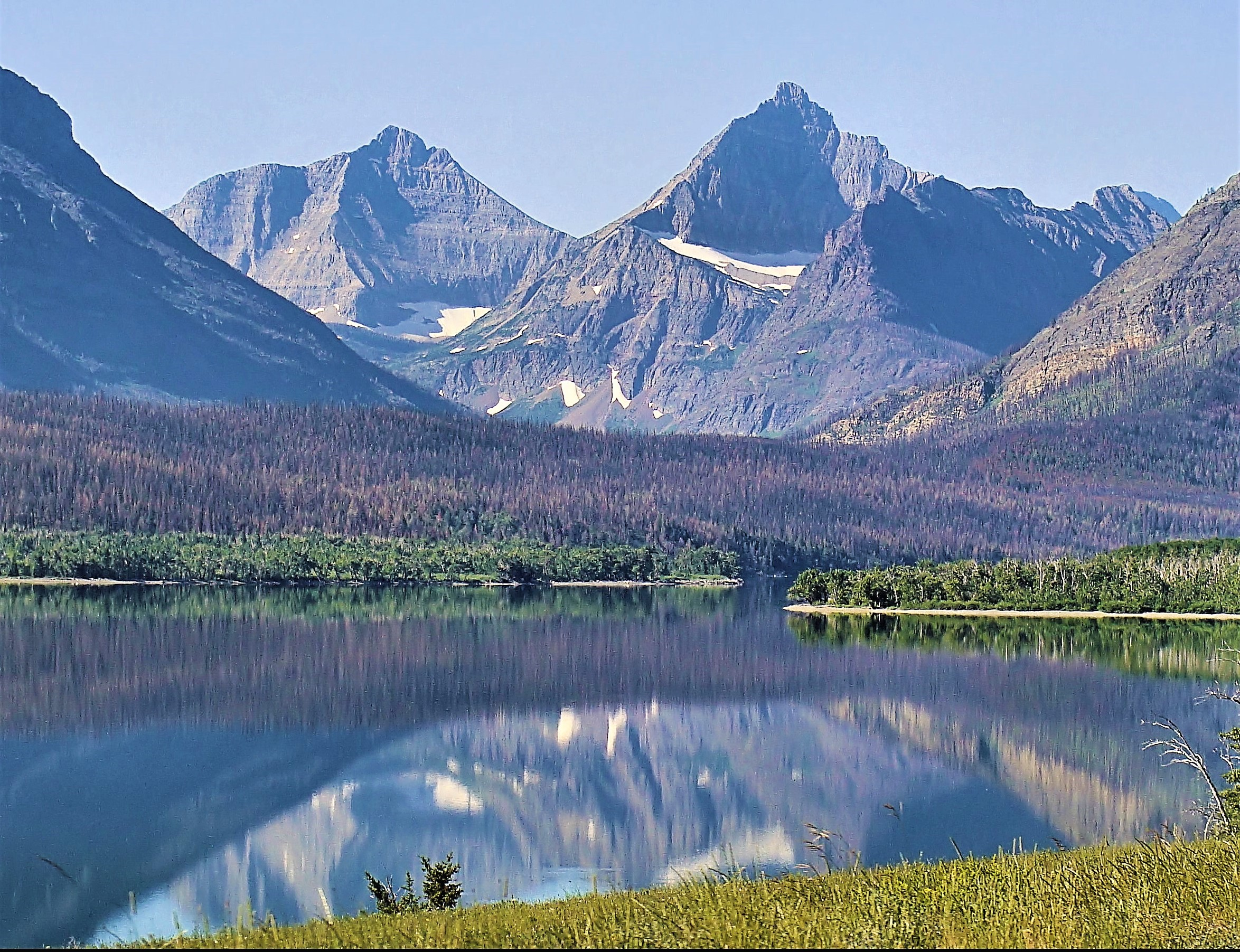
Norris Mountain (left) and Split Mountain (right) from Saint Mary Lake

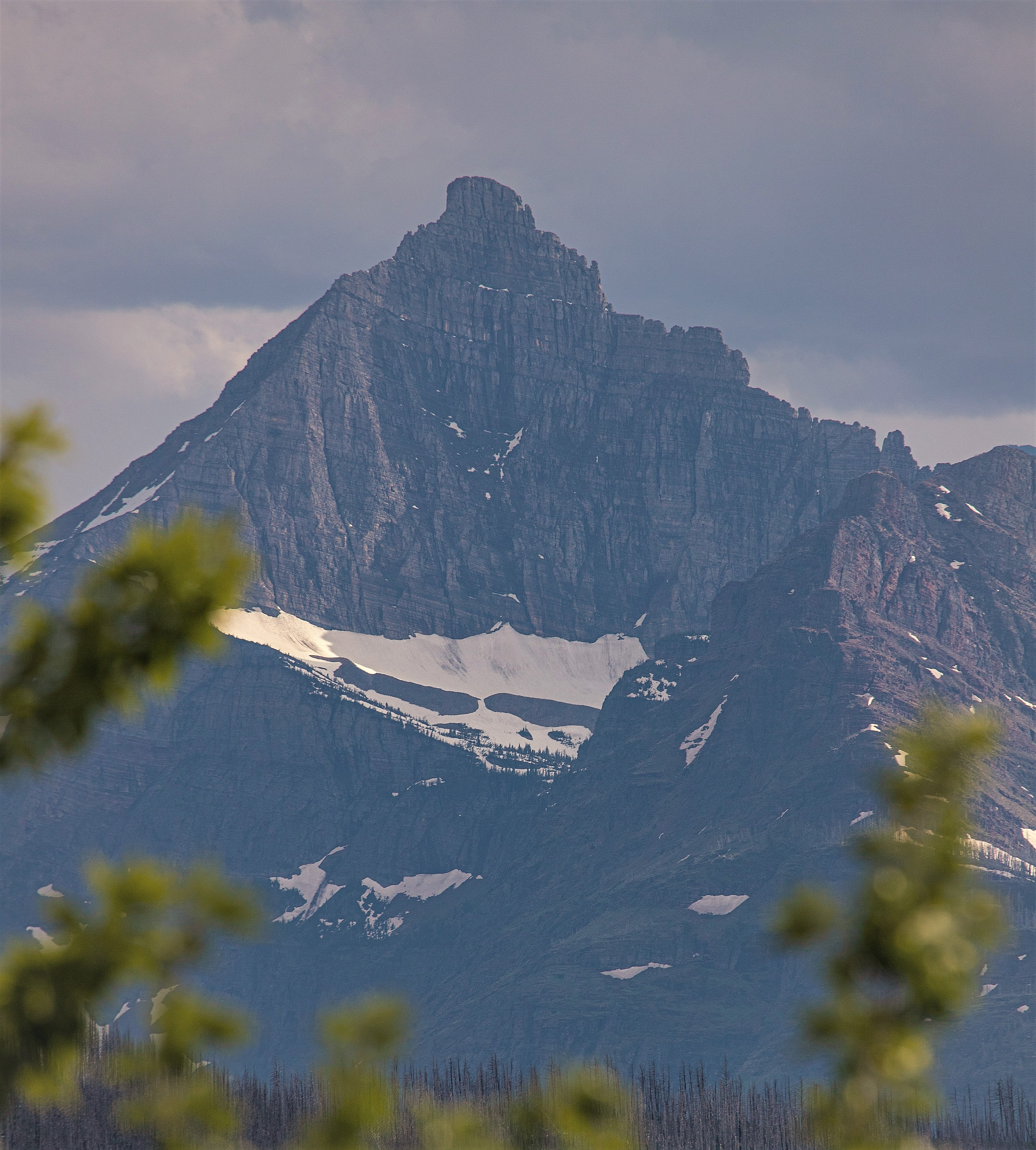
Split Mountain seen from the north at Saint Mary Lake

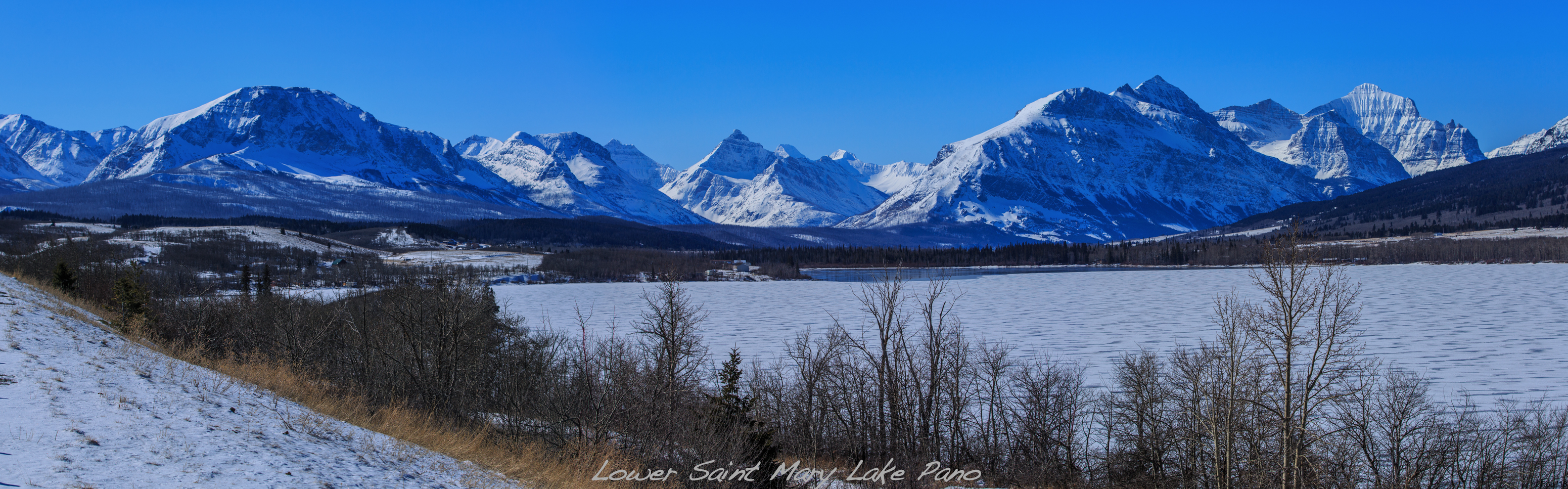
Lower Saint Mary Lake with Split Mountain centered. (see file annotations)

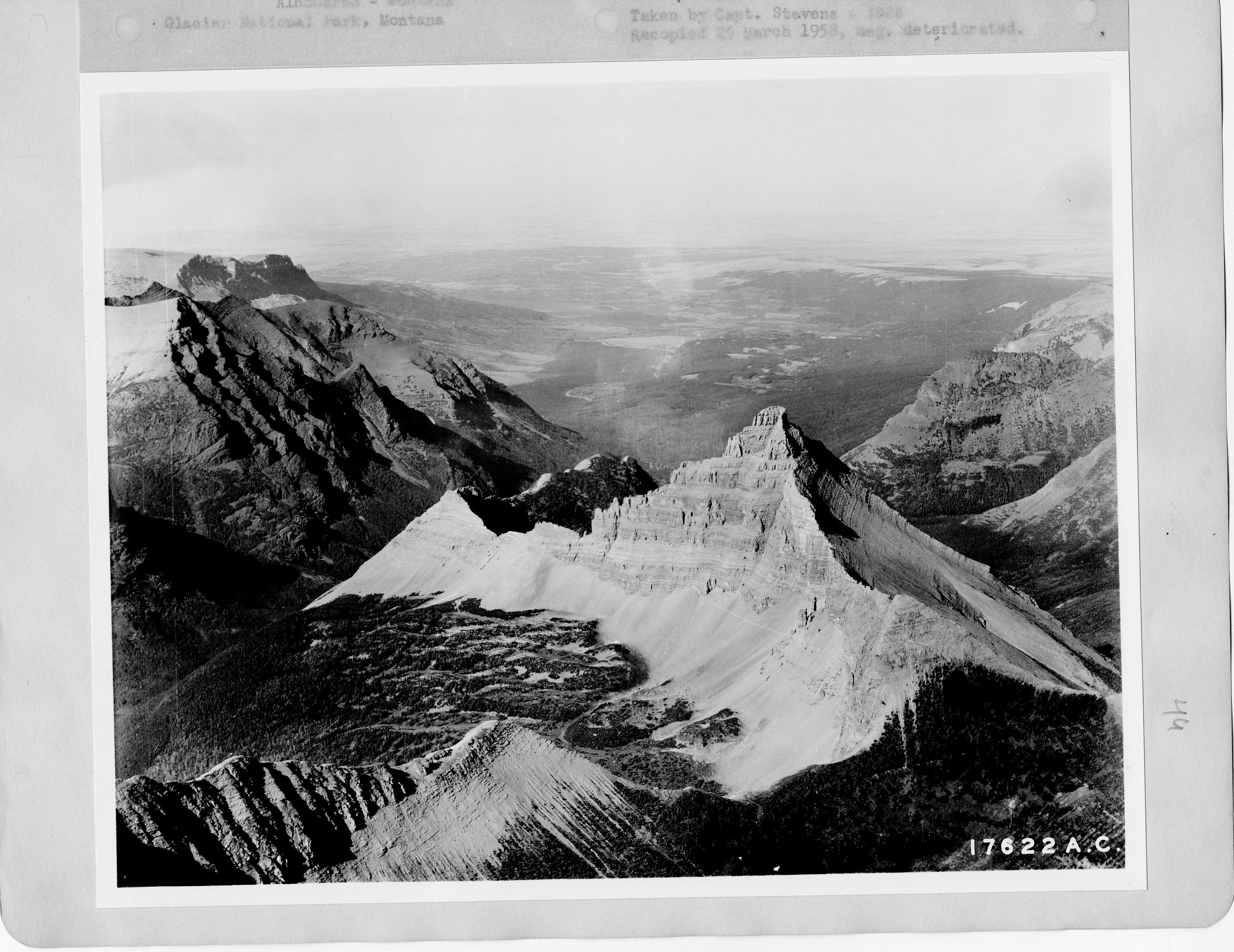
Aerial view, southwest aspect. circa 1925

== See also ==
- Mountains and mountain ranges of Glacier National Park (U.S.)
