= Otokomi Mountain =

Mountain in Glacier National Park, Montana, U.S.

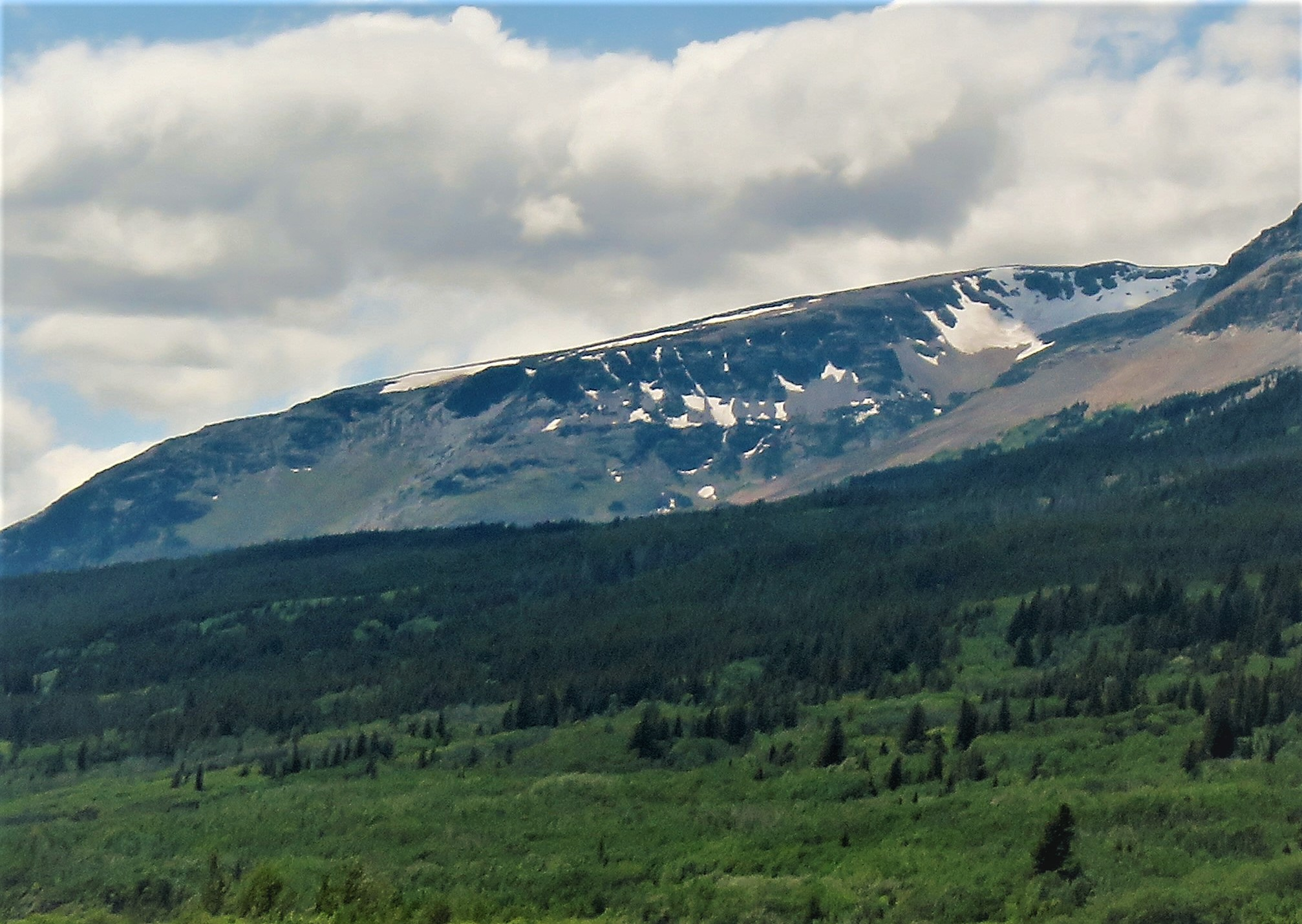
- East aspect

Highest point
- Elevation: 7,939 ft (2,420 m)
- Prominence: 415 ft (126 m)
- Coordinates: 48°43′30″N 113°32′11″W

Geography
- Location within Montana Location within the United States
- Location: Glacier County, Montana, U.S.
- Parent range: Lewis Range
- Topo map: USGS Rising Sun MT

Climbing
- First ascent: Unknown
- Easiest route: class 3

Otokomi Mountain (7,939 feet (2,420 m)) is located in the Lewis Range, Glacier National Park in the U.S. state of Montana. Named for George Bird Grinnell's part-Blackfoot hunting partner named Otokomi which means "yellowfish'. Otokomi Mountain is north of the Rising Sun Auto Camp and Saint Mary Lake.

== See also ==
- Mountains and mountain ranges of Glacier National Park (U.S.)
