= Medicine Owl Peak =

Mountain in Montana, United States

- Location within Montana Location within the United States

Highest point
- Elevation: 8,284 ft (2,525 m)
- Prominence: 604 ft (184 m)
- Coordinates: 48°36′32″N 113°29′43″W

Geography
- Location: Glacier County, Montana, U.S.
- Parent range: Lewis Range
- Topo map(s): USGS Cut Bank Pass, MT

Medicine Owl Peak (8,284 feet (2,525 m)) is located in the Lewis Range, Glacier National Park, in the U.S. state of Montana. It is situated .71 mi (1.14 km) northwest of Amphitheater Mountain.

== See also ==
- Mountains and mountain ranges of Glacier National Park (U.S.)
