= Mad Wolf Mountain =

Mountain in United States of America

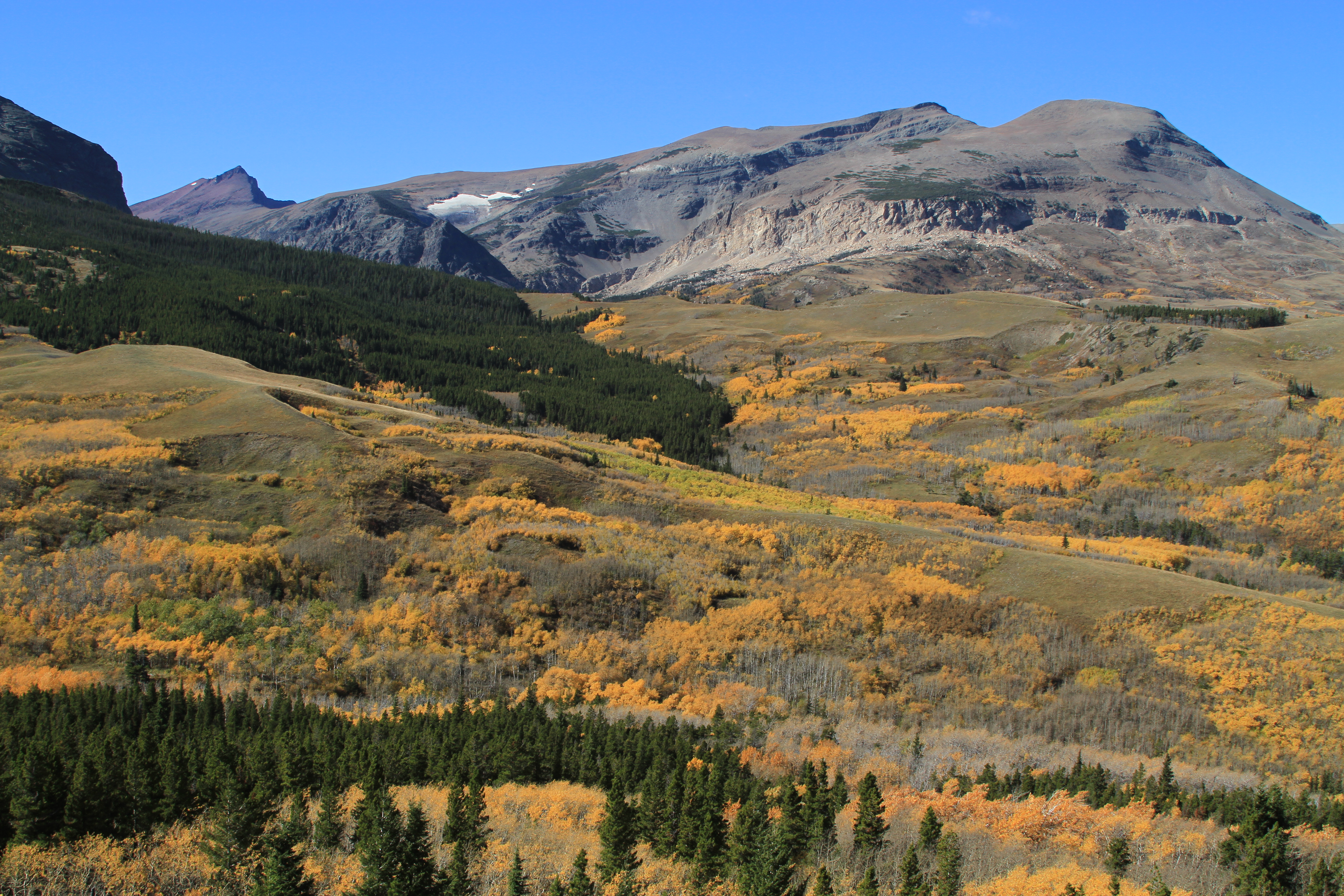
- East aspect from Highway 49

Highest point
- Elevation: 8,341 ft (2,542 m)
- Prominence: 456 ft (139 m)
- Parent peak: Red Mountain
- Coordinates: 48°34′04″N 113°22′07″W

Geography
- Location within Montana Location within the United States
- Location: Glacier County, Montana, U.S.
- Parent range: Lewis Range
- Topo map(s): USGS Cut Bank Pass, MT

Mad Wolf Mountain is located in the Lewis Range of the Glacier National Park in the U.S. state of Montana. Mad Wolf Mountain is just west of the Blackfeet Indian Reservation, and rises abruptly above the Great Plains. It stands at 8,341 feet, or 2,542 meters. A Blackfeet name for the mountain was Muk-sin-a', or "Angry Woman", named for a Blackfeet woman who captured an enemy man attempting to steal horses.

== See also ==
- List of mountains and mountain ranges of Glacier National Park (U.S.)
