= Gable Mountain =

Mountain in Montana, United States

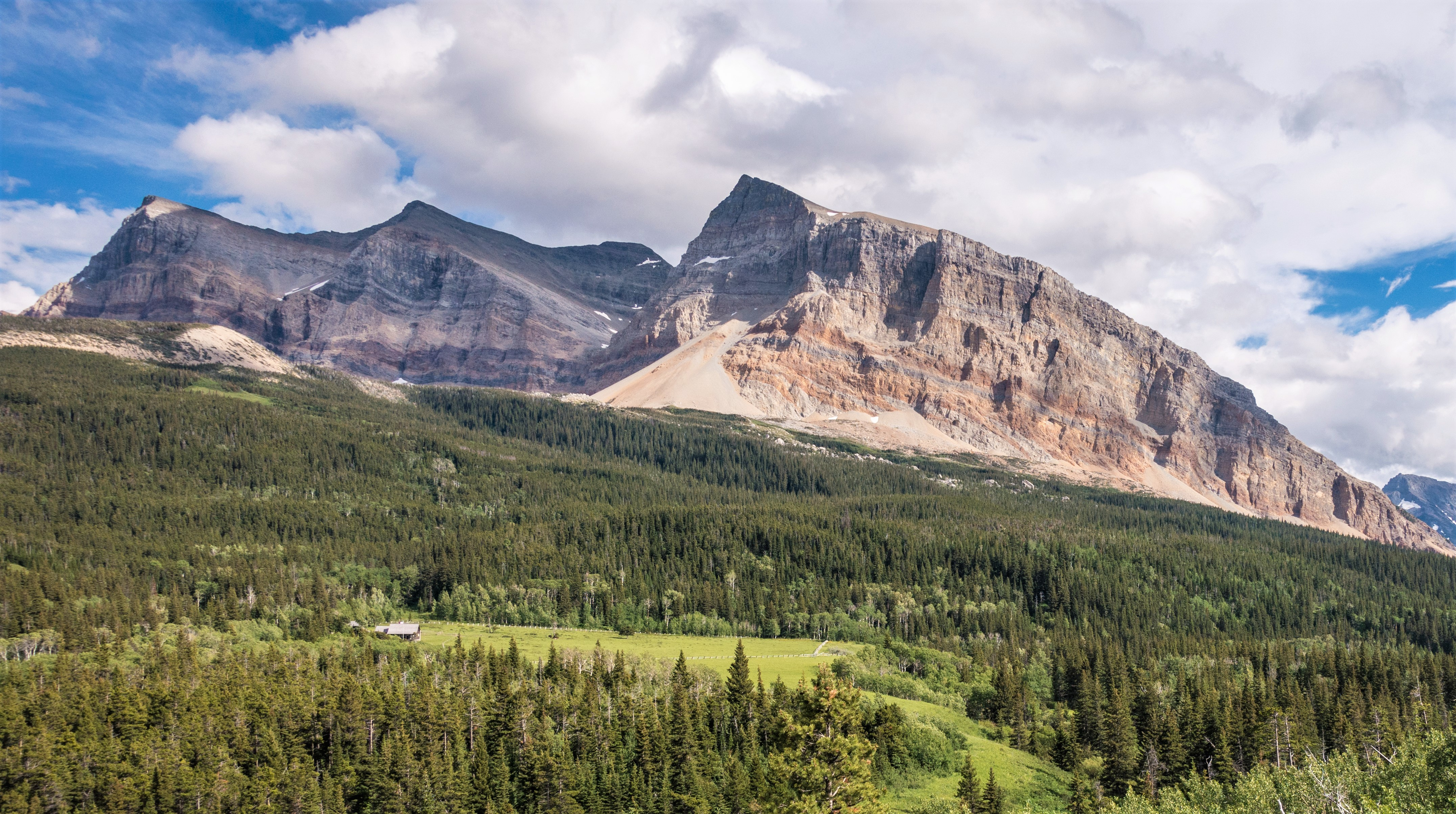
- Northwest aspect

Highest point
- Elevation: 9,267 ft (2,825 m) NAVD 88
- Prominence: 1,902 ft (580 m)
- Parent peak: Mount Wilbur
- Listing: Mountains in Glacier County, Montana
- Coordinates: 48°54′22″N 113°40′25″W

Geography
- Location within Montana Location within the United States
- Location: Glacier County, Montana, U.S.
- Parent range: Lewis Range
- Topo map(s): USGS Gable Mountain, MT

Gable Mountain (9,262 feet (2,823 m)) is located in the Lewis Range, Glacier National Park in the U.S. state of Montana. Gable Mountain is in the northeastern section of Glacier National Park, approximately 3 miles (4.8 km) southwest of the prominent Chief Mountain.

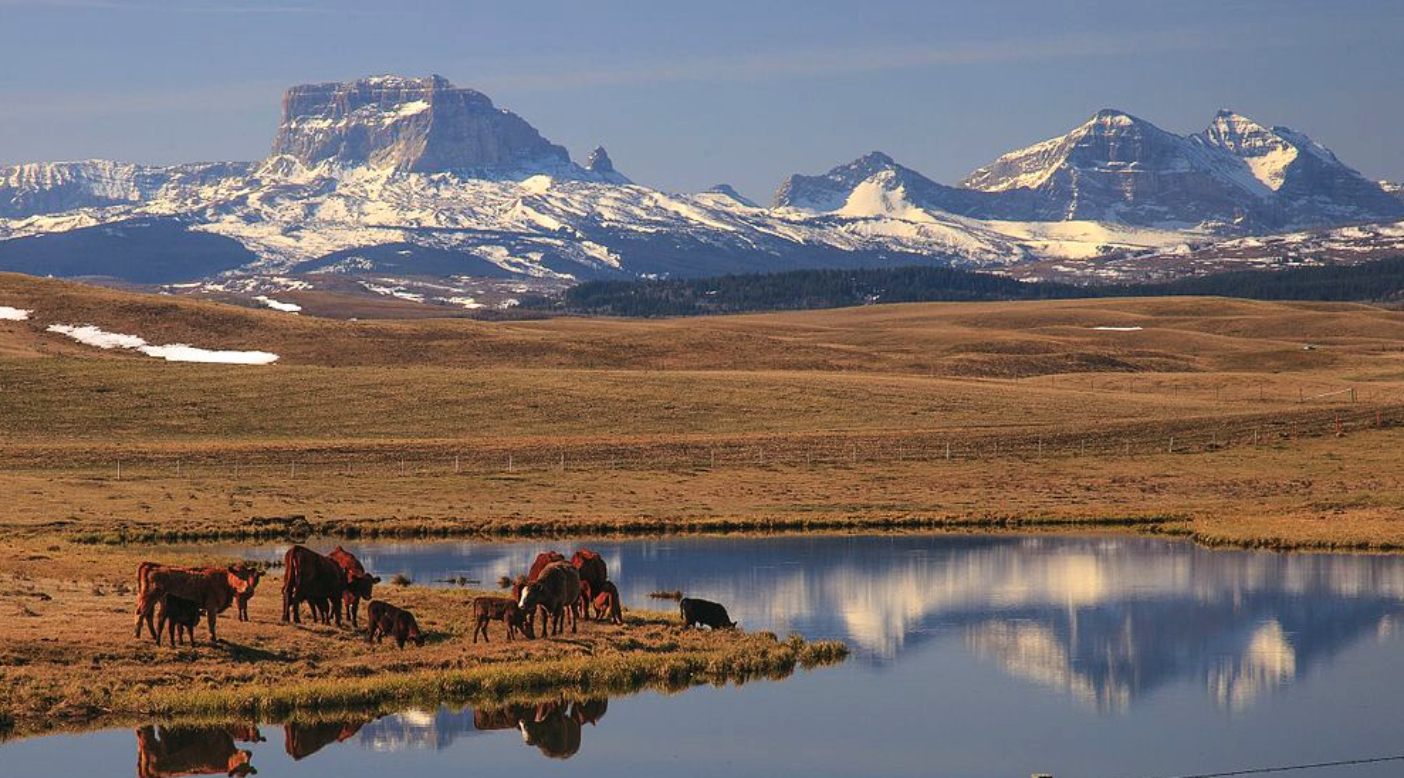
Gable Mountain to right with Chief Mountain to the left

== See also ==
- List of mountains and mountain ranges of Glacier National Park (U.S.)
