= Whitecrow Mountain (Canada) =

Mountain in Alberta and British Columbia, Canada

- Location within Alberta Location within British Columbia Location within Canada

Highest point
- Elevation: 2,881 m (9,452 ft)
- Prominence: 313 m (1,027 ft)
- Parent peak: Blackrock Mountain ( (2910 m)
- Listing: Mountains of Alberta; Mountains of British Columbia
- Coordinates: 52°33′44″N 118°16′13″W

Geography
- Country: Canada
- Provinces: Alberta and British Columbia
- District: Cariboo Land District
- Protected areas: Jasper National Park; Mount Robson Provincial Park
- Parent range: Park Ranges
- Topo map: NTS 83D9 Amethyst Lakes

Climbing
- First ascent: 1921 by Interprovincial Boundary Commission

Whitecrow Mountain is located at the head of the Fraser River in Mount Robson Provincial Park on the Continental Divide marking the Alberta-British Columbia border. It was named in 1922 by Arthur O. Wheeler for the number of white crows that were seen on the peak.

== See also ==
- List of peaks on the Alberta–British Columbia border
