= Mount James =

Mountain in Montana, United States

- Mount James as ssen from the southwest. Taken neaer Triple Divide Pass.

Highest point
- Elevation: 9,380 ft (2,860 m)
- Prominence: 1,978 ft (603 m)
- Listing: Mountains in Glacier County, Montana
- Coordinates: 48°35′04″N 113°29′32″W

Geography
- Location within Montana Location within the United States
- Location: Glacier County, Montana, U.S.
- Parent range: Lewis Range
- Topo map(s): USGS Cut Bank Pass, MT

Mount James (9,380 feet (2,859 m)) is located in the Lewis Range, Glacier National Park in the U.S. state of Montana. Mount James is 1.35 miles (2.17 km) northeast of Triple Divide Peak. The Blackfeet name for the mountain is Ah'-kow-to-mak-an (Double Runner).

== Geology ==
Like the mountains in Glacier National Park, Mt. James is composed of sedimentary rock laid down during the Precambrian to Jurassic periods. Formed in shallow seas, this sedimentary rock was initially uplifted beginning 170 million years ago when the Lewis Overthrust fault pushed an enormous slab of precambrian rocks 3 mi (4.8 km) thick, 50 miles (80 km) wide and 160 miles (260 km) long over younger rock of the cretaceous period. The route to climb to the top of the mountain is about 9 miles, and the mountain's latitude and longitude are 48.58442°N and -113.49233°W, or 48° 35' 4" north and 113° 29' 32" west. The average barometric pressure of the mountain is about 71KPa. There are also a variety of lakes and peaks surrounding the mountain as well, such as the Medicine Grizzly Lake, the Atlantic Falls, the Medicine Owl lake, the Norris Mountain Peak, the Medicine Grizzly Peak, and the Bad Marriage Mountain.

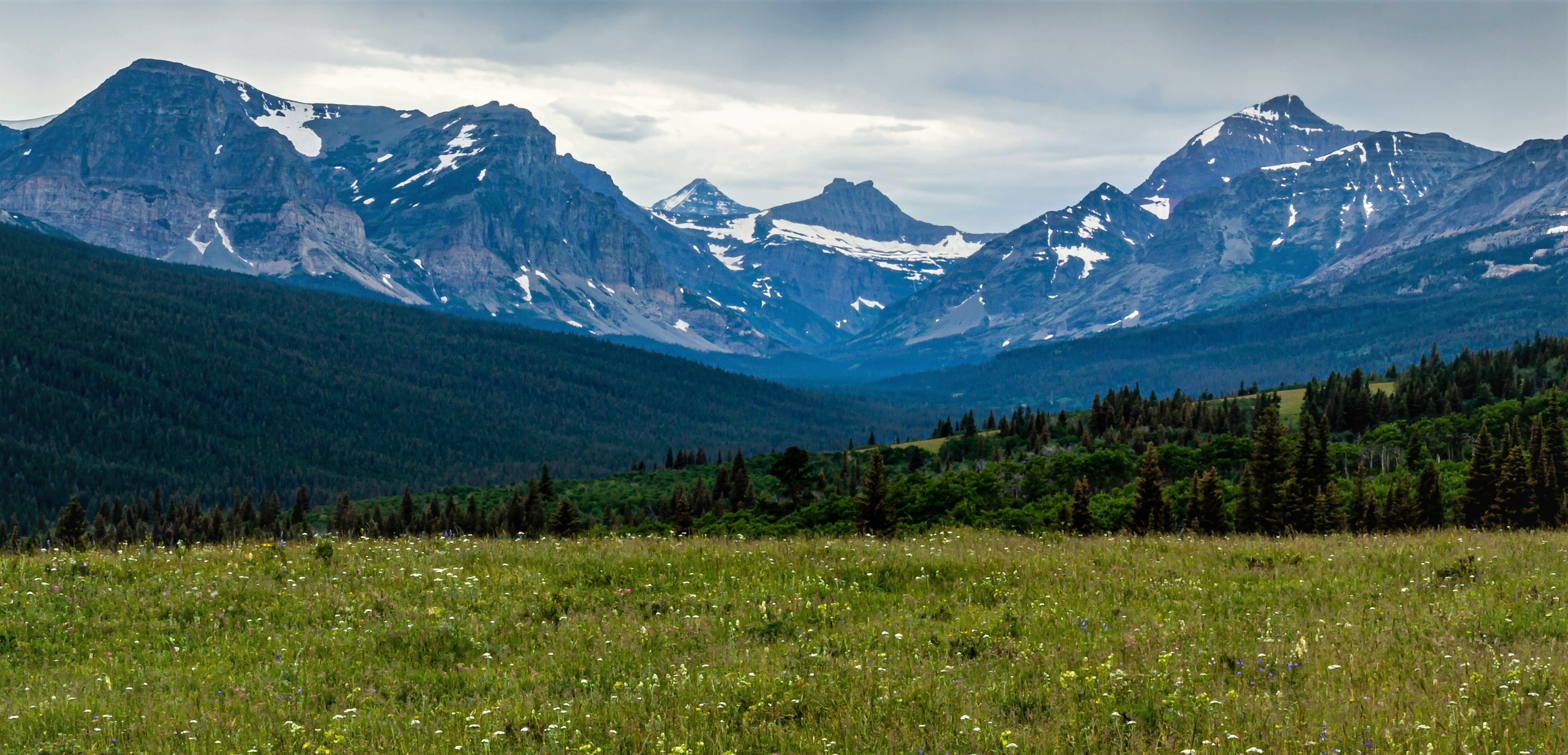
Mount James to the right, Bad Marriage Mountain to left.

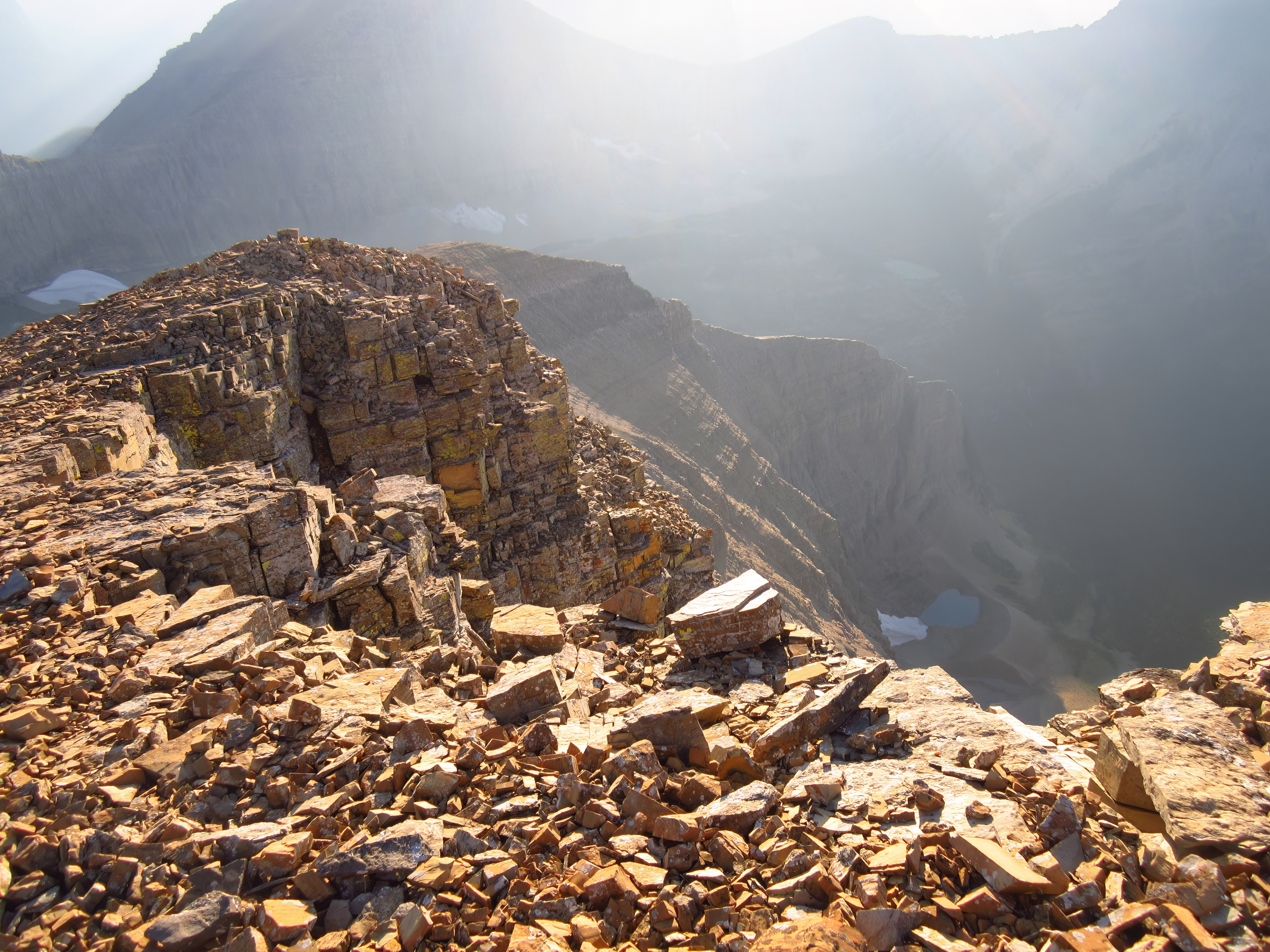
Mount James summit

== Climate ==
Based on the Köppen climate classification, Mt. James is located in an alpine subarctic climate zone characterized by long, usually very cold winters, and short, cool to mild summers. Temperatures can drop below −10 °F with wind chill factors below −30 °F. In the summer, the sun can be out for around 16 hours before setting, and as short as 8 hours in the winter. Grizzly bears have commonly been spotted in this area during the warmer months as well, along with the American black bear as well as the Coyote.

== See also ==
- List of mountains and mountain ranges of Glacier National Park (U.S.)
- Mount James Walker
- List of mountains of Jamaica
- List of mountains in Ethiopia
- List of mountains in Australia
