= Sarcee Mountain =

Mountain in the state of Montana

- Location within Montana

Highest point
- Elevation: 8,353 ft (2,546 m)
- Prominence: 1,233 ft (376 m)
- Coordinates: 48°59′19″N 113°47′16″W

Geography
- Location: Glacier County, Montana, U.S.
- Parent range: Lewis Range
- Topo map(s): USGS Mount Cleveland, MT

Sarcee Mountain (8,353 feet (2,546 m)) is located in the Lewis Range, Glacier National Park in the U.S. state of Montana. Sarcee Mountain is in the northeastern region of the park.

== See also ==
- Mountains and mountain ranges of Glacier National Park (U.S.)
