= Mount Ellsworth (Montana) =

Mountain in Glacier County, Montana, United States

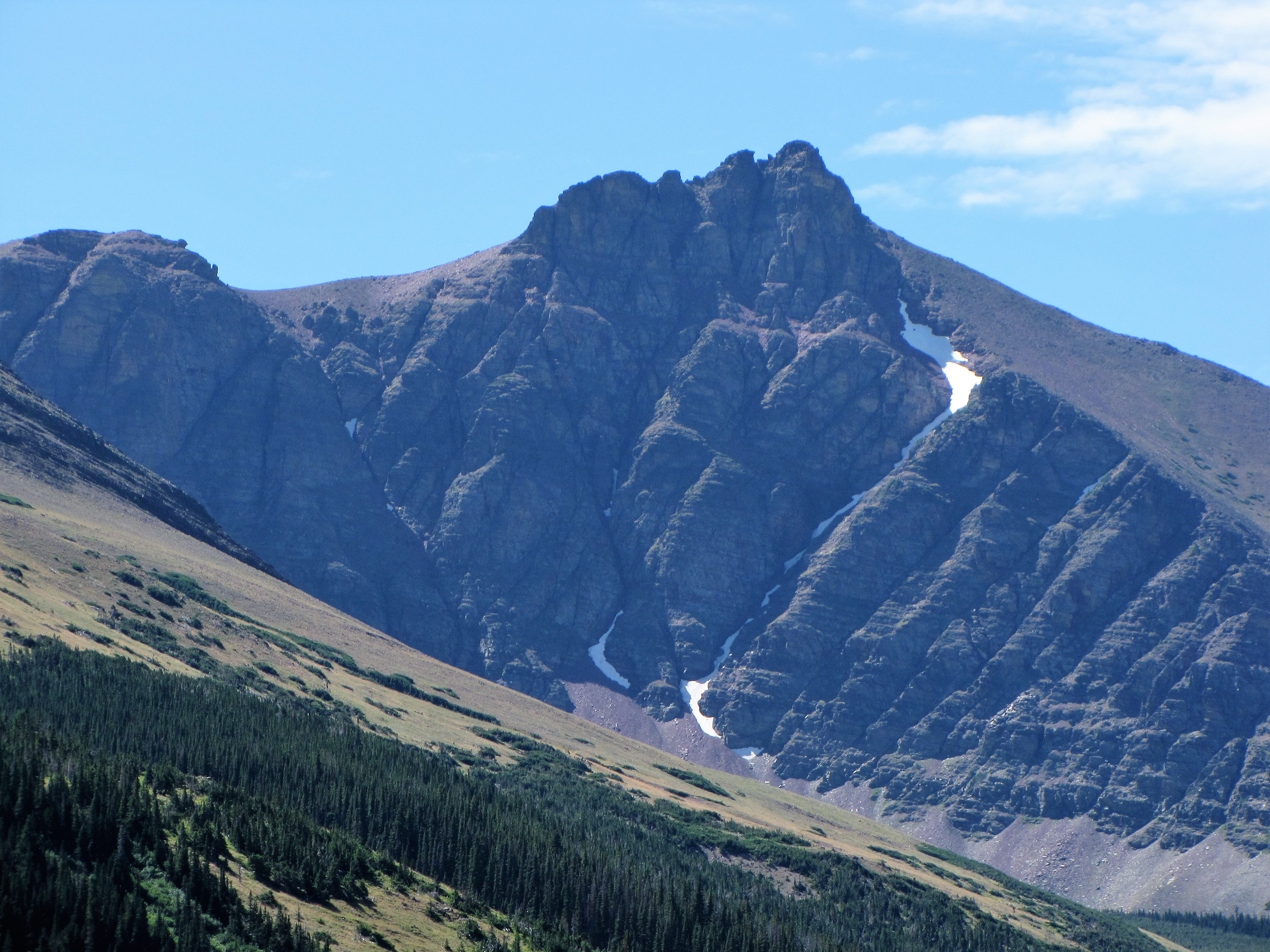
- Mount Ellsworth as seen from Two Medicine Lake

Highest point
- Elevation: 8,586 ft (2,617 m)
- Prominence: 661 ft (201 m)
- Coordinates: 48°26′11″N 113°22′08″W

Geography
- Location within Montana Location within the United States
- Location: Glacier County, Montana, U.S.
- Parent range: Lewis Range
- Topo map(s): USGS Squaw Mountain, MT

Mount Ellsworth (8,586 feet (2,617 m)) is located in the Lewis Range, Glacier National Park in the U.S. state of Montana. Mount Ellsworth is in the southeastern section of Glacier National Park and can be seen from Two Medicine Lake and surrounding areas. Mount Ellsworth is named, "for "Billy" Ellsworth, an oldtimer who packed for the U. S. Geological Survey."

== See also ==
- Mountains and mountain ranges of Glacier National Park (U.S.)
