= Divide Mountain =

Mountain in Montana, United States

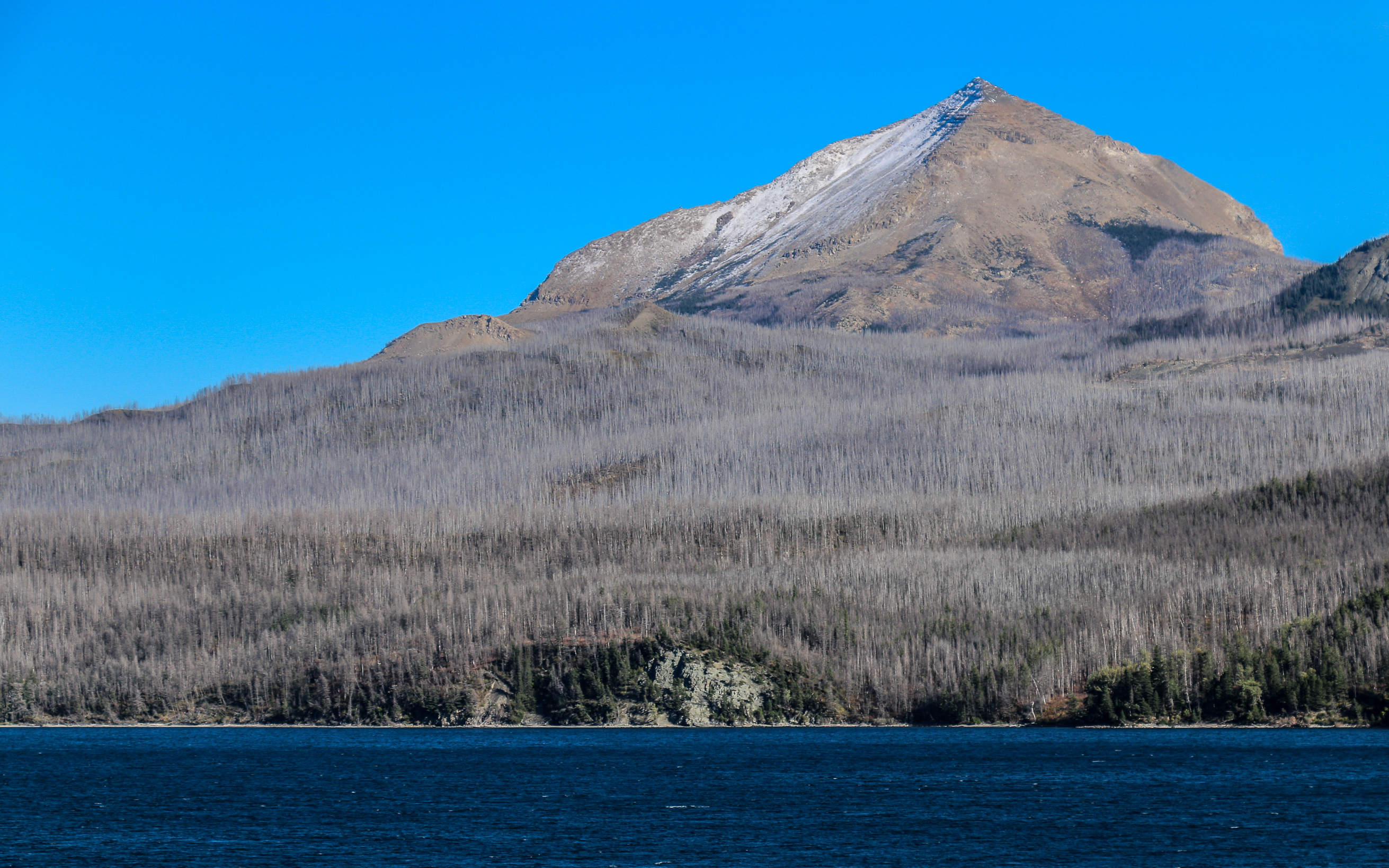
- Divide Mountain and Saint Mary Lake

Highest point
- Elevation: 8,670 ft (2,640 m) NAVD 88
- Prominence: 1,345 ft (410 m)
- Coordinates: 48°39′55″N 113°24′03″W

Geography
- Location within Montana Location within the United States
- Location: Glacier County, Montana, U.S.
- Parent range: Lewis Range
- Topo map(s): USGS Saint Mary, MT

Climbing
- First ascent: Unknown
- Easiest route: Scramble

Divide Mountain (8,670 feet (2,643 m)) is located in the Lewis Range, Glacier National Park in the U.S. state of Montana. Divide Mountain is located south of Saint Mary, Montana on the border of Glacier National Park and the Blackfeet Indian Reservation.

Divide Mountain is also notable as the line parent of Mount Mitchell, North Carolina, which is the highest point in the Eastern United States.

== See also ==
- Mountains and mountain ranges of Glacier National Park (U.S.)
