= Blackrock Mountain (Canada) =

Mountain in Alberta and British Columbia, Canada

- Location within Alberta Location within British Columbia Location within Canada

Highest point
- Elevation: 2,911 m (9,551 ft)
- Prominence: 481 m (1,578 ft)
- Parent peak: Elephas Mountain 2978 m
- Listing: Mountains of Alberta; Mountains of British Columbia
- Coordinates: 52°34′17″N 118°17′59″W

Geography
- Country: Canada
- Provinces: Alberta and British Columbia
- Parent range: Continental
- Topo map: NTS 83D9 Amethyst Lakes

Blackrock Mountain is located on the provincial border of Alberta and British Columbia. It was named in 1921 by Arthur O. Wheeler for the black Ordovician rock present in the area.

== See also ==
- List of peaks on the Alberta–British Columbia border
