= Lewis Range =

Mountain range in Montana, United States and Alberta, Canada

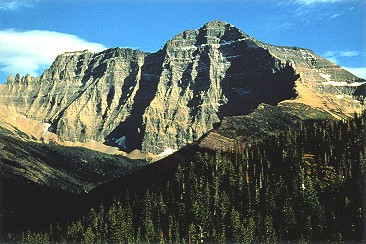
- Mt. Cleveland is the highest peak in the Lewis Range

Highest point
- Peak: Mount Cleveland, Montana
- Elevation: 10,479 ft (3,194 m)
- Listing: Mountain ranges of Montana; Mountain ranges of Alberta
- Coordinates: 48°55′29″N 113°50′53″W

Geography
- Location within Montana Location within the United States Location within Alberta Location within Canada
- Countries: United States and Canada
- Province/State: Montana and Alberta
- Parent range: Border Ranges

Geology
- Orogeny: Lewis Overthrust

The Lewis Range is a mountain range located in the Rocky Mountains of northern Montana, United States and extreme southern Alberta, Canada. It was formed as a result of the Lewis Overthrust, a geologic thrust fault involving the overlying of younger Cretaceous rocks by older Proterozoic rocks. The range is located within Waterton Lakes National Park in Alberta, Canada and Glacier National Park and the Bob Marshall Wilderness Complex in Montana, United States. The highest peak is Mount Cleveland at 10,479 ft (3,194 m).

== Geography ==
The Lewis Range is within Waterton Lakes National Park in Canada, and in Glacier National Park in Montana. The Continental Divide spans much of the uppermost sections of the range. Major peaks in the range include Mount Cleveland (10,479 ft; 3,194 m), which is the highest peak in the range and in Glacier National Park. Other prominent peaks include Mount Stimson (10,142 ft; 3,091 m), Mount Jackson (10,052 ft; 3,064 m), Mount Siyeh (10,014 ft; 3,052 m), Going to the Sun Mountain, (9,642 ft; 2,939 m) and the isolated Chief Mountain (9,080 ft; 2,770 m). This sharp range begins north of Marias Pass and includes Logan Pass which bisects Glacier National Park east to west.

== Geology ==
Formed by the Lewis Overthrust beginning 170 million years ago, an enormous slab of Precambrian rocks 3 miles (4.8 km) thick, 50 miles (80 km) wide and 160 miles (260 km) long faulted and slid over newer rocks of the Cretaceous period. In this relatively rare occurrence, older rocks are now positioned above newer ones.

== See also ==
- List of mountains and mountain ranges of Glacier National Park (U.S.)
