= Sinopah =

Blackfoot leader (c.1796–c.1880)

Sinopah (Kit Fox)
- Ap'-ah-ki
- Born: c. 1796; Montana Territory, United States
- Died: c. 1880
- Other names: Woman Kit Fox, Sinopa, Sinopahahki

Sinopah (Ap'-ah-ki) (c. 1796-c. 1880) was a Blackfeet Confederacy woman married to interpreter Hugh Monroe. She was the daughter of Blackfeet Confederacy Chief Lone Walker. Sinopah Mountain, located in Glacier National Park in the U.S. state of Montana, is named after her. Sinopah means "kit fox" in Blackfeet.

== Life ==
Sinopah was born in the Montana Territory and was part of the Blackfeet Confederacy. Her father was Pikuni Chief Lone Walker (Ni-to-wa-wa-ka). In 1820 she married Hugh "Rising Wolf" Monroe, a white trapper and interpreter who became part of the Blackfeet tribe. During their marriage they were trappers and hunters in multiple places including the Canadian province of Saskatchewan, Fort Benton, Montana, and the area around Glacier National Park. Differing accounts list the couple as having between seven and ten children. Family members reported that she died before 1880 but the exact date and place are unknown. Mountains named for her father (Lone Walker Mountain) and husband (Rising Wolf Mountain) are on either side of the mountain named in her honor in Glacier National Park.
