= Two Medicine =

Subregion of Glacier National Park in Montana, United States

Coordinates: 48°29′11″N 113°21′57″W

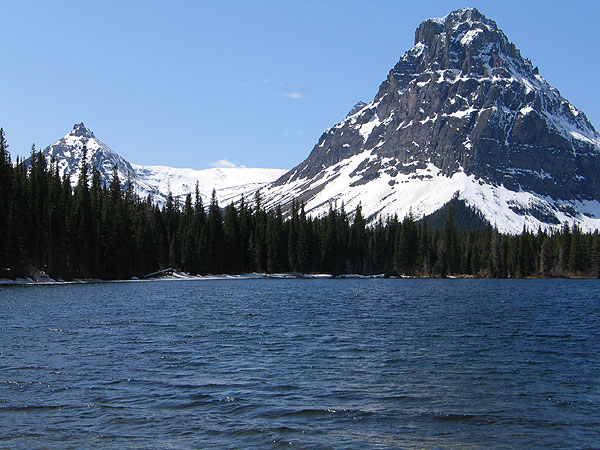
Two Medicine Lake with Sinopah Mountain

Two Medicine is the collective name of a region located in the southeastern section of Glacier National Park, in the U.S. state of Montana. It has a campground alongside Two Medicine Lake. From the period starting in the late 1890s until the completion of the Going-to-the-Sun Road in 1932, Two Medicine was one of the most visited sections of the park. Once part of a larger chalet complex, the Two Medicine Store is located along the shores of Two Medicine Lake and the building is a National Historic Landmark. The region is a starting point for many trails and tourboats take visitors out on Two Medicine Lake, where the steep south face of Rising Wolf Mountain towers above the lake. The region was considered sacred ground by several Native American tribes including the Blackfeet and they performed Vision quests here. Aside from Chief Mountain, the Two Medicine area is the most sacred section of the park to the Blackfeet.

From the Two Medicine Store, several hiking trails lead west and north from the area. Three lakes dominate the area, including Lower Two Medicine Lake, which is also on the Blackfeet Indian Reservation, Two Medicine Lake, which is the location of the campstore and the scenic boat rides, and Upper Two Medicine Lake which is a 4 miles (6.4 km) hike from the trailhead.

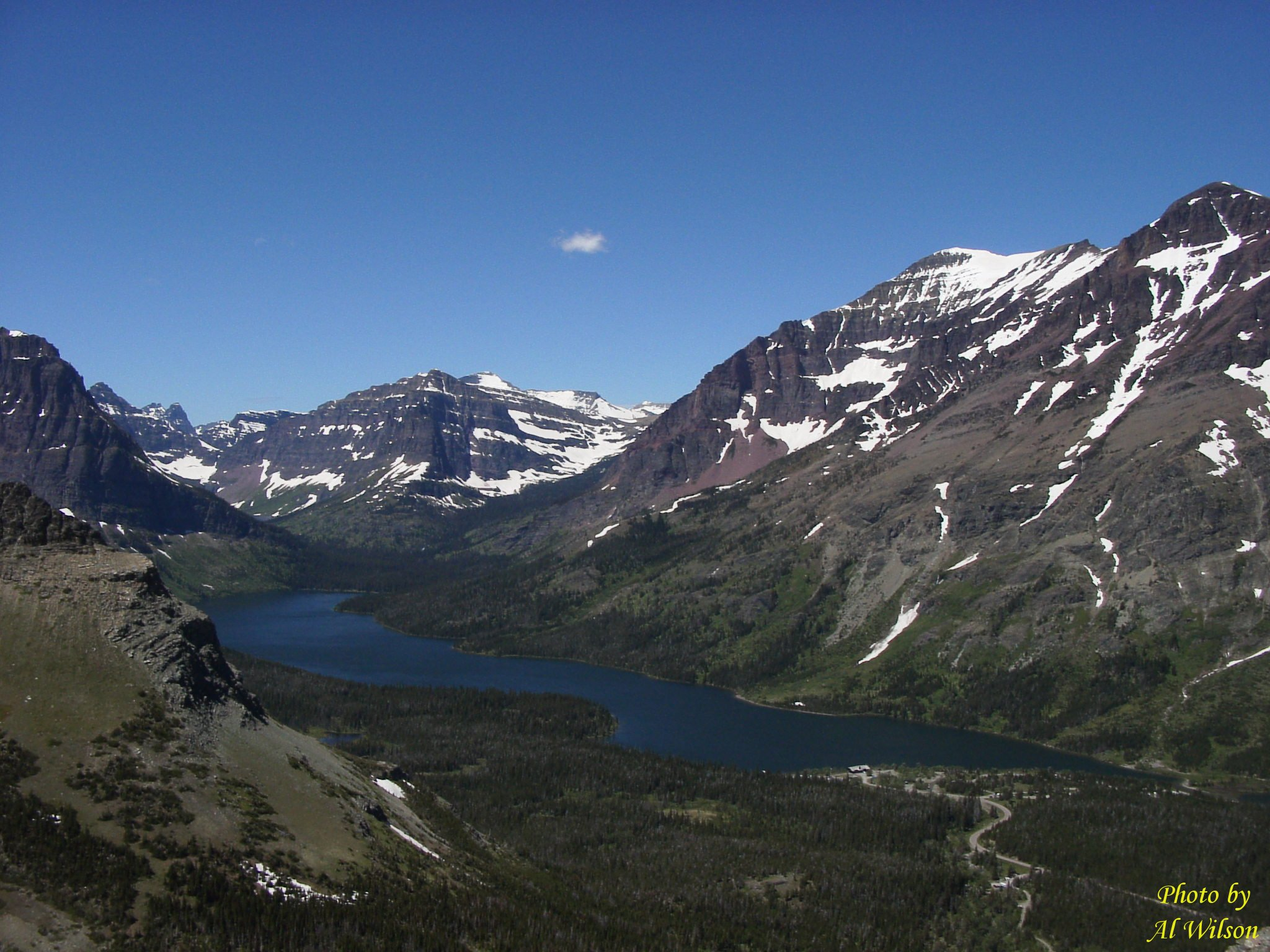
Two Medicine Lake
