= Lone Walker =

Blackfoot Confederacy chief

Lone Walker (Ni-to-wa-wa-ka) was a Blackfoot Confederacy chief. Lone Walker Mountain is named after him. He was the father of Sinopah, who married interpreter Hugh Monroe.
