= McClintock Peak =

Mountain in Montana, United States

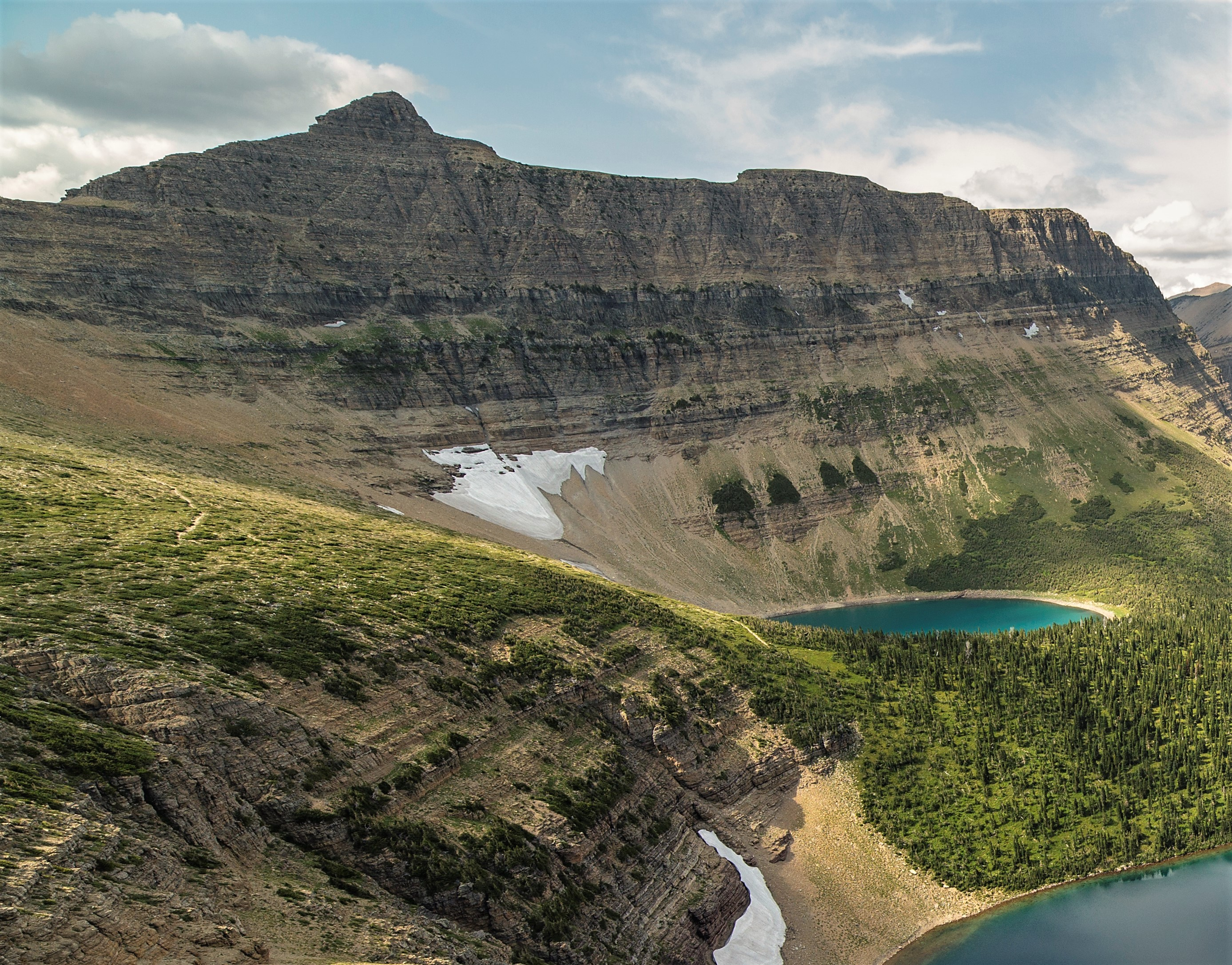
- Southeast aspect of McClintock Peak seen with Lake of the Seven Winds from Pitamakan Pass

Highest point
- Elevation: 8,290 ft (2,530 m)
- Prominence: 365 ft (111 m)
- Coordinates: 48°31′30″N 113°28′21″W

Naming
- Etymology: Walter McClintock (1870–1949)

Geography
- Location within Montana Location within the United States
- Location: Flathead County, Montana, Glacier County, Montana, U.S.
- Parent range: Lewis Range
- Topo map(s): USGS Cut Bank Pass, MT

McClintock Peak (8,290 feet (2,527 m)) is located in the Lewis Range, Glacier National Park in the U.S. state of Montana. McClintock Peak is situated along the Continental Divide. The Lake of the Seven Winds sits below the east slopes of the peak and Mount Morgan is .56 mi (0.90 km) to the south.

== Geology ==
Like other mountains in Glacier National Park, the mountain is composed of sedimentary rock laid down during the Precambrian to Jurassic periods. Formed in shallow seas, this sedimentary rock was initially uplifted beginning 170 million years ago when the Lewis Overthrust fault pushed an enormous slab of precambrian rocks 3 mi (4.8 km) thick, 50 miles (80 km) wide and 160 miles (260 km) long over younger rock of the cretaceous period.

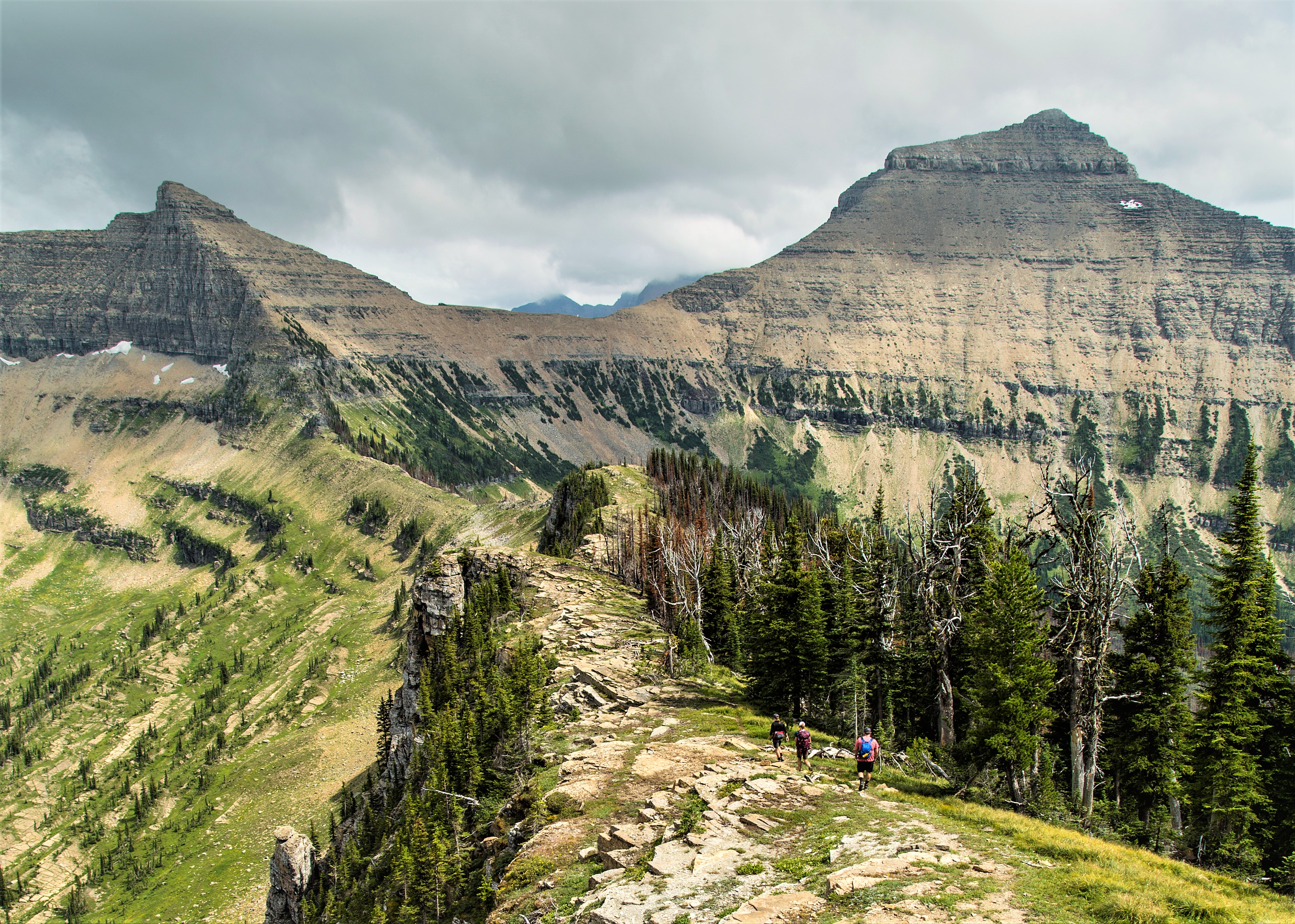
East aspect of McClintock Peak (left), Mount Morgan (right). Looking ESE.

== Climate ==
According to the Köppen climate classification system, the mountain is located in an alpine subarctic climate zone with long, cold, snowy winters, and cool to warm summers. Winter temperatures can drop below −10 °F with wind chill factors below −30 °F. Due to its altitude, it receives precipitation all year, as snow in winter, and as thunderstorms in summer.

== See also ==
- Mountains and mountain ranges of Glacier National Park (U.S.)
