= Red Mountain (Glacier County, Montana) =

Mountain in Montana, United States

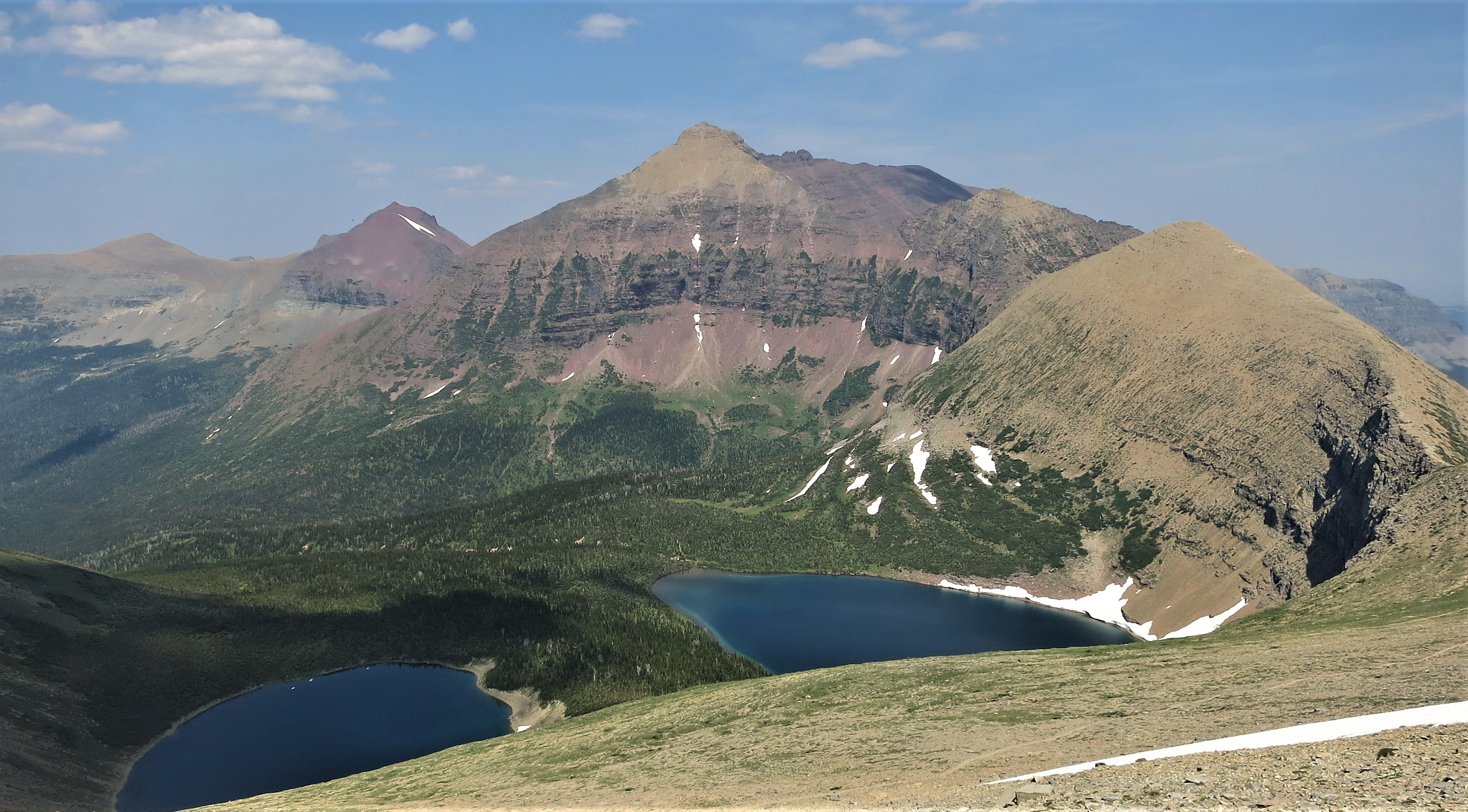
- Southwest aspect. Lake of the Seven Winds and Pitamakan Lake in the bottom.

Highest point
- Elevation: 9,382 ft (2,860 m)
- Prominence: 1,937 ft (590 m)
- Parent peak: Rising Wolf Mountain
- Listing: Mountains in Glacier County, Montana
- Coordinates: 48°32′08″N 113°25′27″W

Geography
- Location within Montana Location within the United States
- Location: Glacier County, Montana, U.S.
- Parent range: Lewis Range
- Topo map(s): USGS Cut Bank Pass, MT

Red Mountain (9,382 feet (2,860 m)) is located in the Lewis Range, Glacier National Park in the U.S. state of Montana. Red Mountain is 2.75 miles (4.43 km) north of Rising Wolf Mountain.

== Geology ==
Like other mountains in Glacier National Park, it is composed of sedimentary rock laid down during the Precambrian to Jurassic periods. Formed in shallow seas, this sedimentary rock was initially uplifted beginning 170 million years ago when the Lewis Overthrust fault pushed an enormous slab of precambrian rocks 3 mi (4.8 km) thick, 50 miles (80 km) wide and 160 miles (260 km) long over younger rock of the cretaceous period.

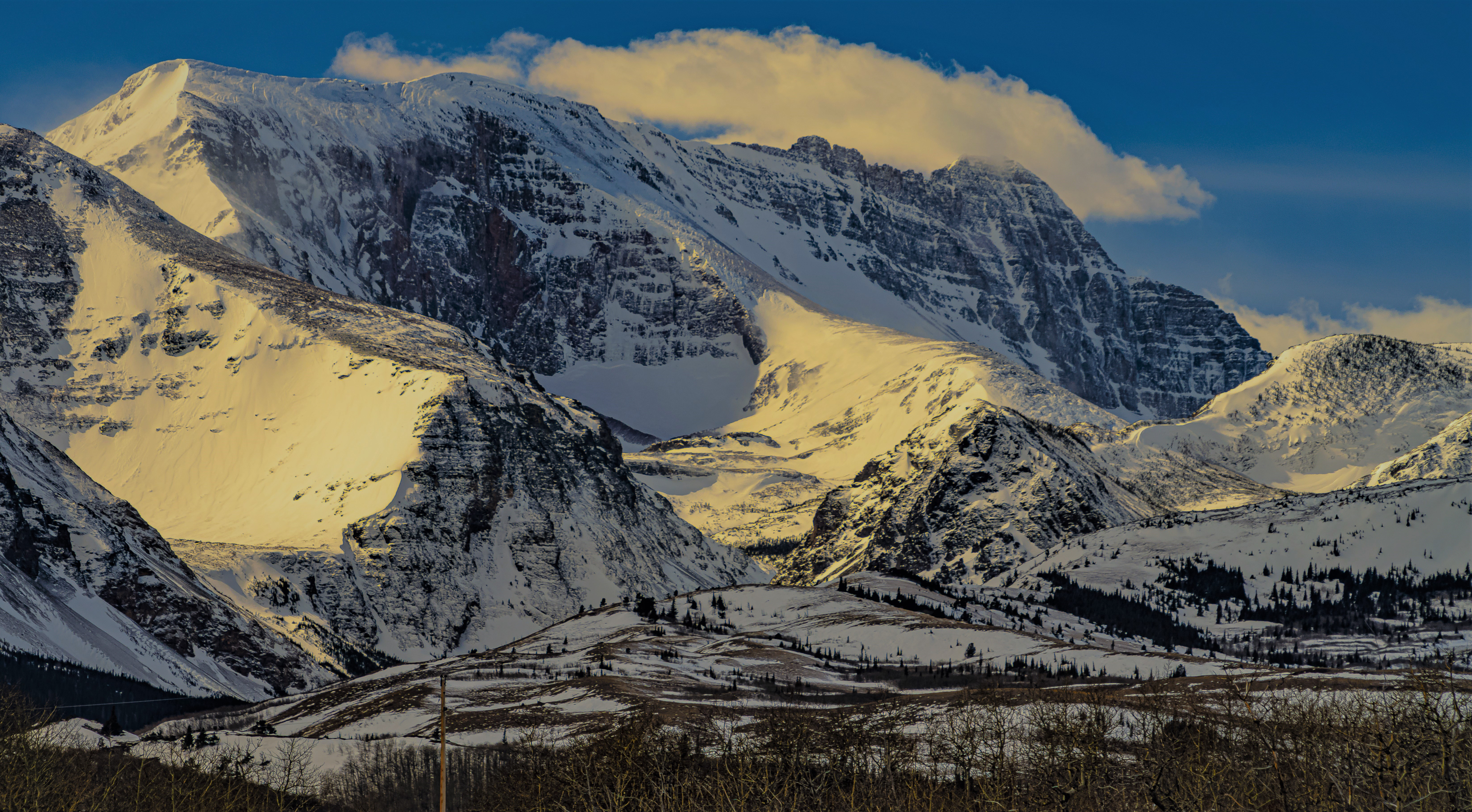
East aspect in winter

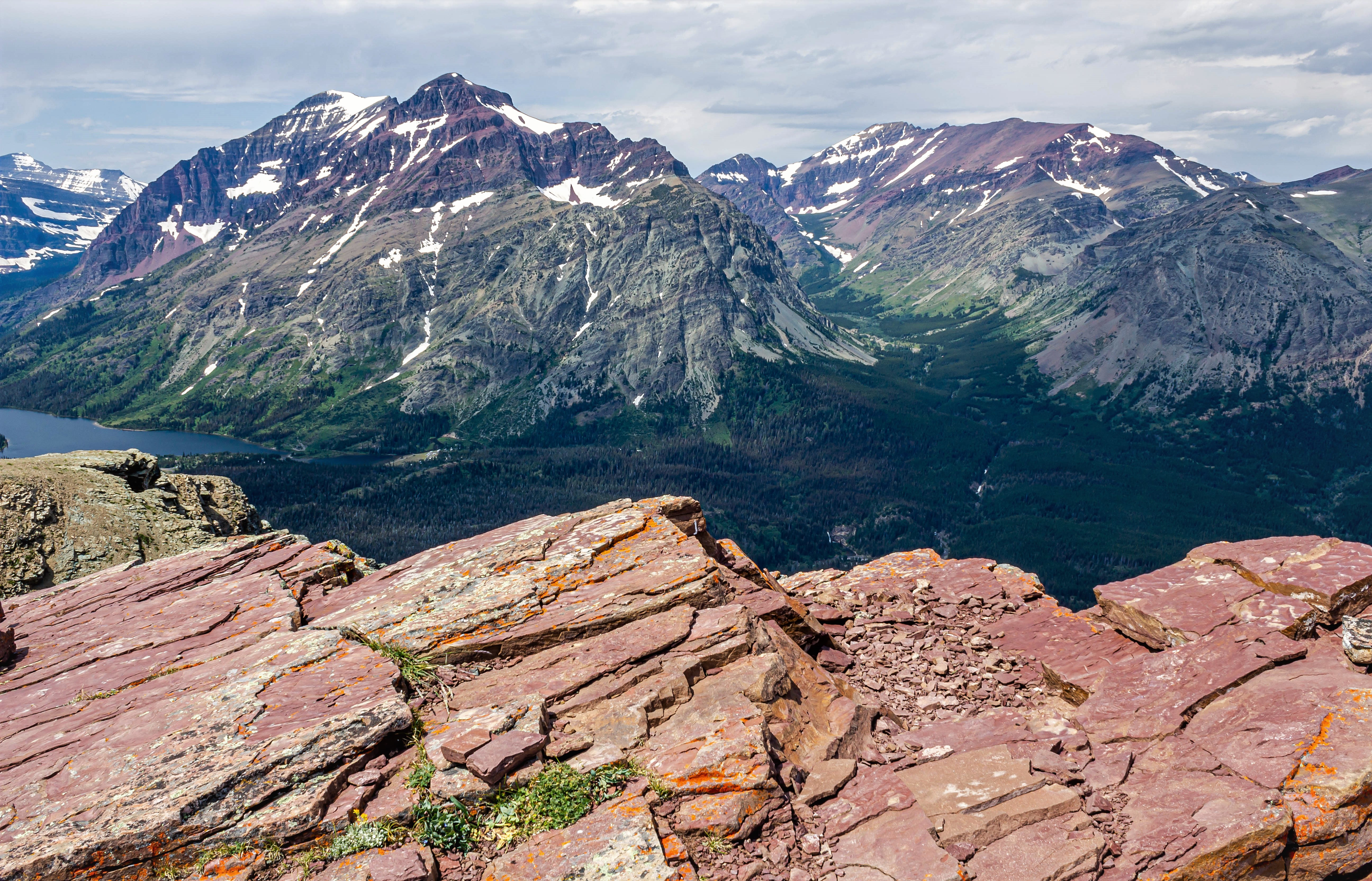
Rising Wolf Mountain (left) and Red Mountain (right) seen from Scenic Point

== Climate ==
Based on the Köppen climate classification, it is located in an alpine subarctic climate zone with long, cold, snowy winters, and cool to warm summers. Winter temperatures can drop below −10 °F with wind chill factors below −30 °F.

Climate data for Red Mountain, Glacier County (MT) 48.5341 N, 113.4066 W, Elevation: 8,717 ft (2,657 m) (1991–2020 normals)
Month	Jan	Feb	Mar	Apr	May	Jun	Jul	Aug	Sep	Oct	Nov	Dec	Year
Mean daily maximum °F (°C)	22.9 (−5.1)	23.6 (−4.7)	29.1 (−1.6)	33.2 (0.7)	42.5 (5.8)	50.4 (10.2)	61.5 (16.4)	61.8 (16.6)	52.8 (11.6)	39.0 (3.9)	27.2 (−2.7)	21.7 (−5.7)	38.8 (3.8)
Daily mean °F (°C)	16.6 (−8.6)	15.9 (−8.9)	20.3 (−6.5)	24.7 (−4.1)	33.3 (0.7)	40.7 (4.8)	50.4 (10.2)	50.5 (10.3)	42.3 (5.7)	30.9 (−0.6)	21.0 (−6.1)	15.6 (−9.1)	30.2 (−1.0)
Mean daily minimum °F (°C)	10.3 (−12.1)	8.2 (−13.2)	11.4 (−11.4)	16.2 (−8.8)	24.2 (−4.3)	31.0 (−0.6)	39.4 (4.1)	39.2 (4.0)	31.7 (−0.2)	22.9 (−5.1)	14.9 (−9.5)	9.5 (−12.5)	21.6 (−5.8)
Average precipitation inches (mm)	8.30 (211)	6.00 (152)	7.32 (186)	5.80 (147)	5.35 (136)	6.32 (161)	2.08 (53)	2.26 (57)	3.92 (100)	5.73 (146)	7.86 (200)	7.63 (194)	68.57 (1,743)
Source: PRISM Climate Group

== See also ==
- List of mountains and mountain ranges of Glacier National Park (U.S.)
