= Sinopah Mountain =

Mountain in Montana, United States

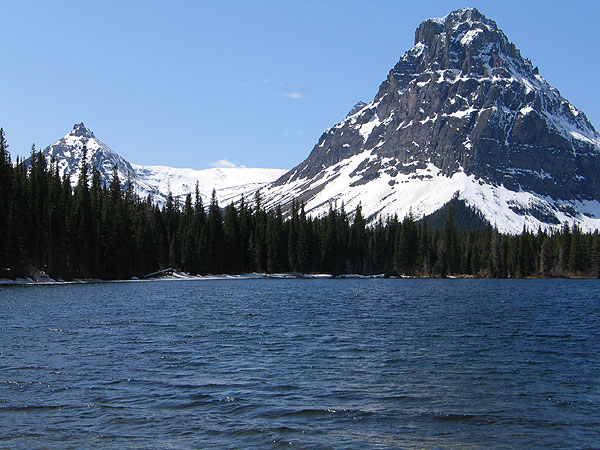
- Sinopah Mountain at right rises dramatically above the western end of Two Medicine Lake

Highest point
- Elevation: 8,276 ft (2,523 m)
- Prominence: 191 ft (58 m)
- Coordinates: 48°27′48″N 113°24′44″W

Geography
- Location within Montana Location within the United States
- Location: Glacier County, Montana, U.S.
- Parent range: Lewis Range
- Topo map(s): USGS Mount Rockwell, MT

Climbing
- Easiest route: Scramble

Sinopah Mountain (8,276 feet (2,523 m)) is located in the Lewis Range, Glacier National Park in the U.S. state of Montana. Sinopah Mountain rises prominently to the west of Two Medicine Lake. Sinopah means, ""kit fox" in Blackfeet, (who) was the Indian wife of Hugh Monroe (Rising Wolf) and daughter of Lone Walker, a powerful Blackfeet chief."

== Geology ==
Like other mountains in Glacier National Park, the peak is composed of sedimentary rock laid down during the Precambrian to Jurassic periods. Formed in shallow seas, this sedimentary rock was initially uplifted beginning 170 million years ago when the Lewis Overthrust fault pushed an enormous slab of precambrian rocks 3 mi (4.8 km) thick, 50 miles (80 km) wide and 160 miles (260 km) long over younger rock of the cretaceous period.

== Climate ==
Based on the Köppen climate classification, the peak is located in an alpine subarctic climate zone with long, cold, snowy winters, and cool to warm summers. Temperatures can drop below −10 °F with wind chill factors below −30 °F.

== Gallery ==
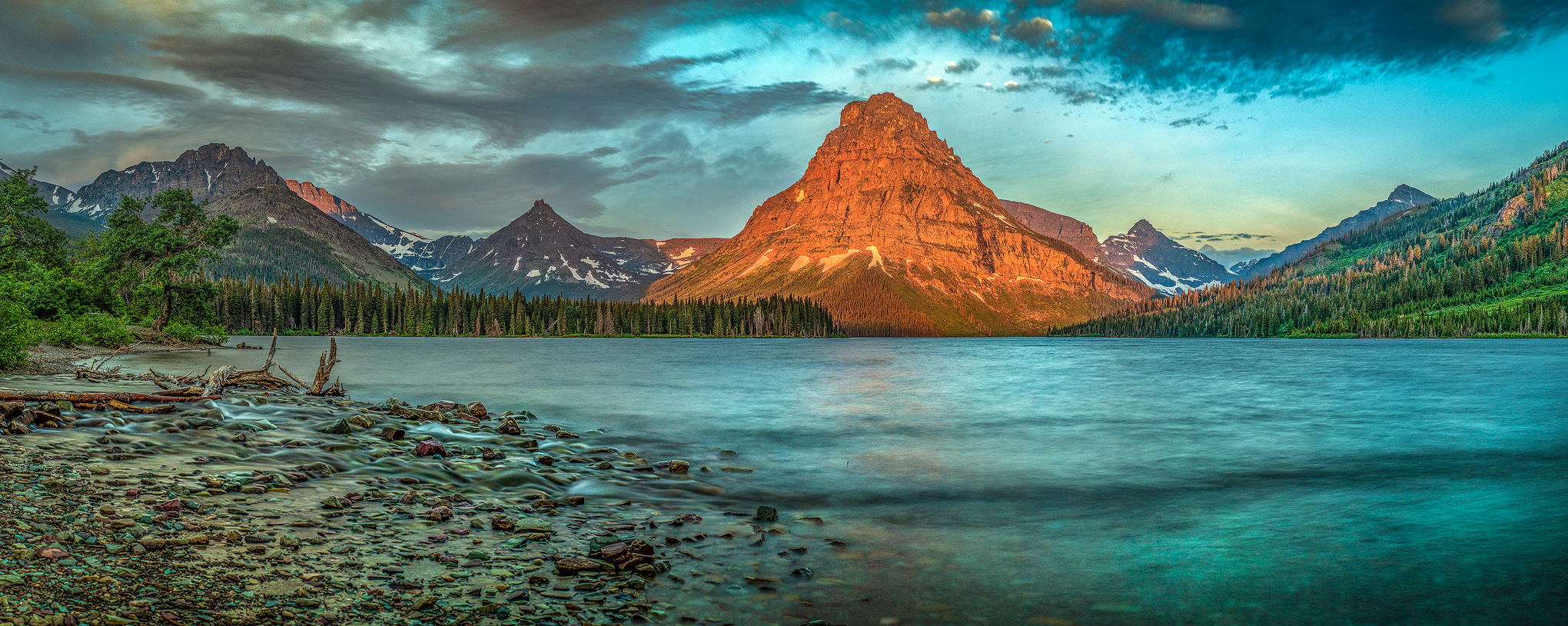
Sinopah and Two Medicine Lake

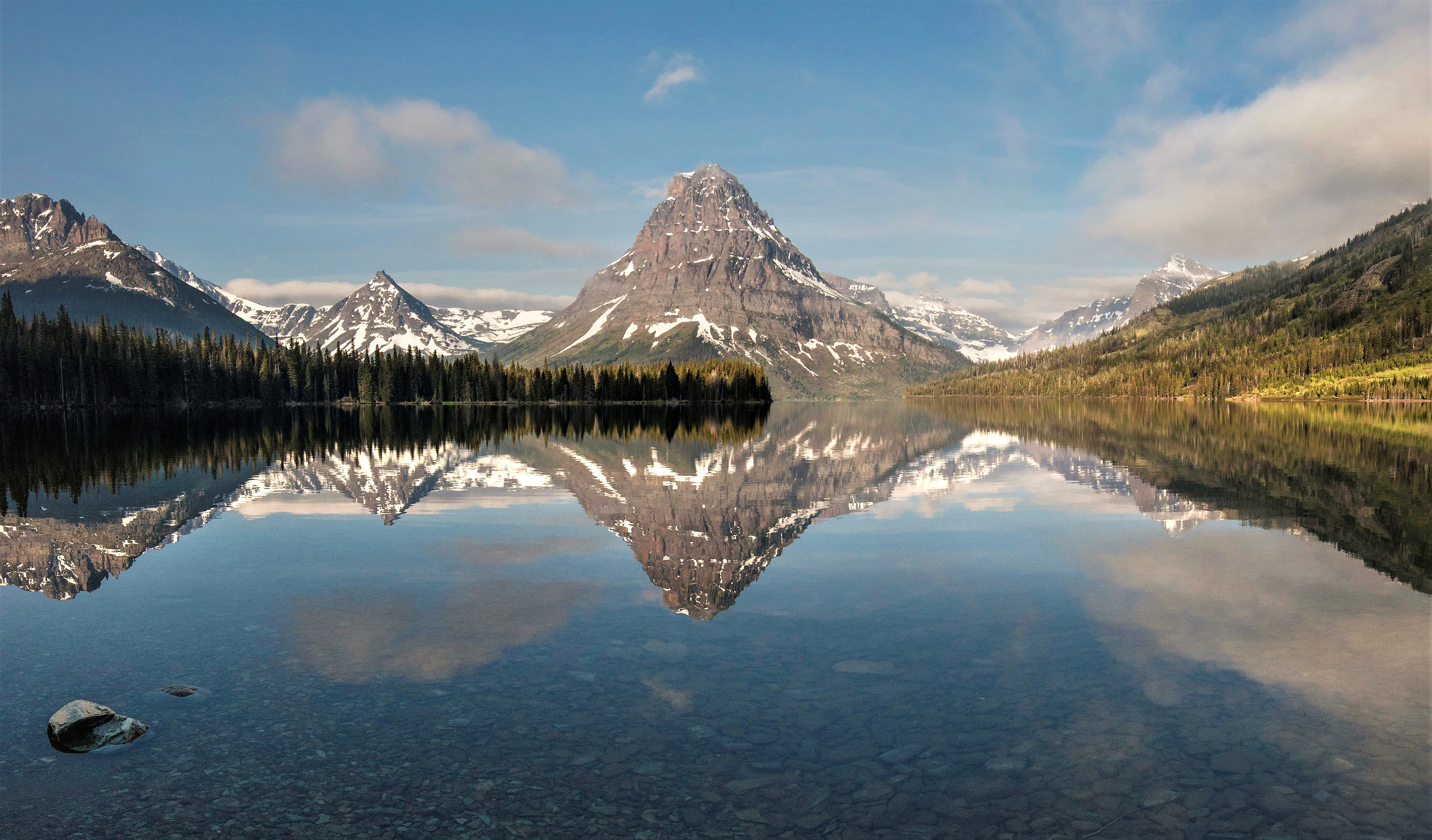
Sinopah reflected in Two Medicine Lake

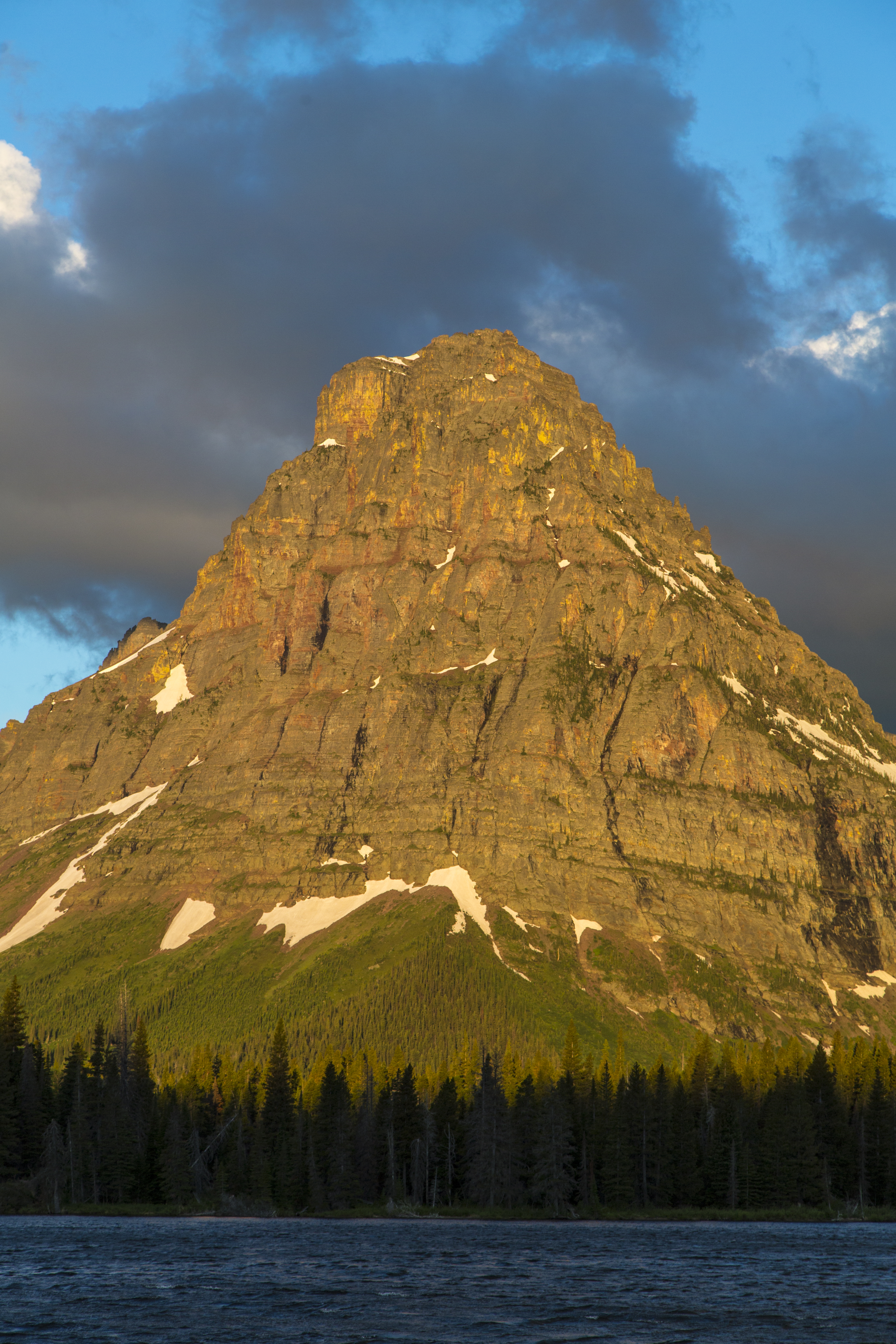
At sunrise

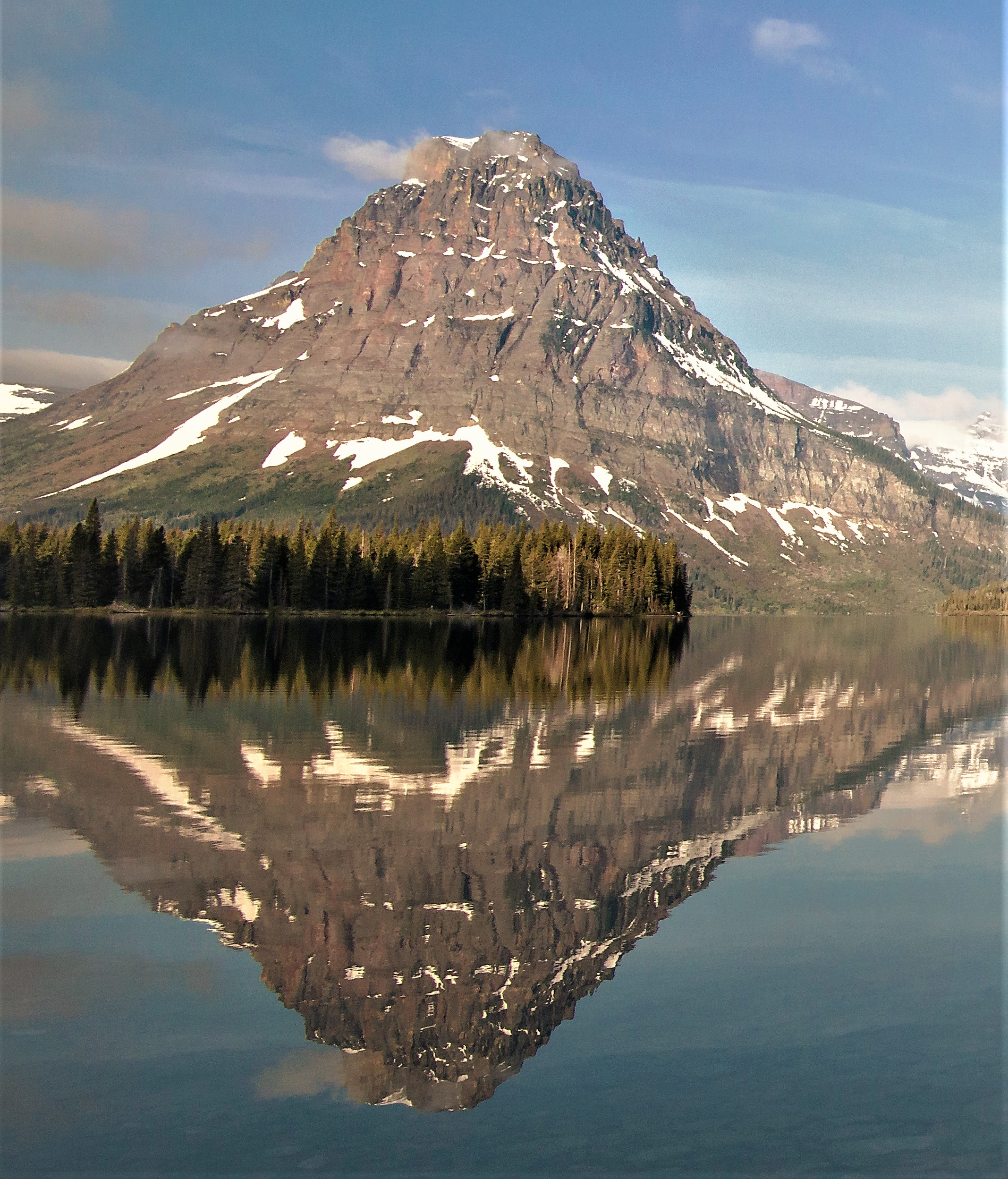

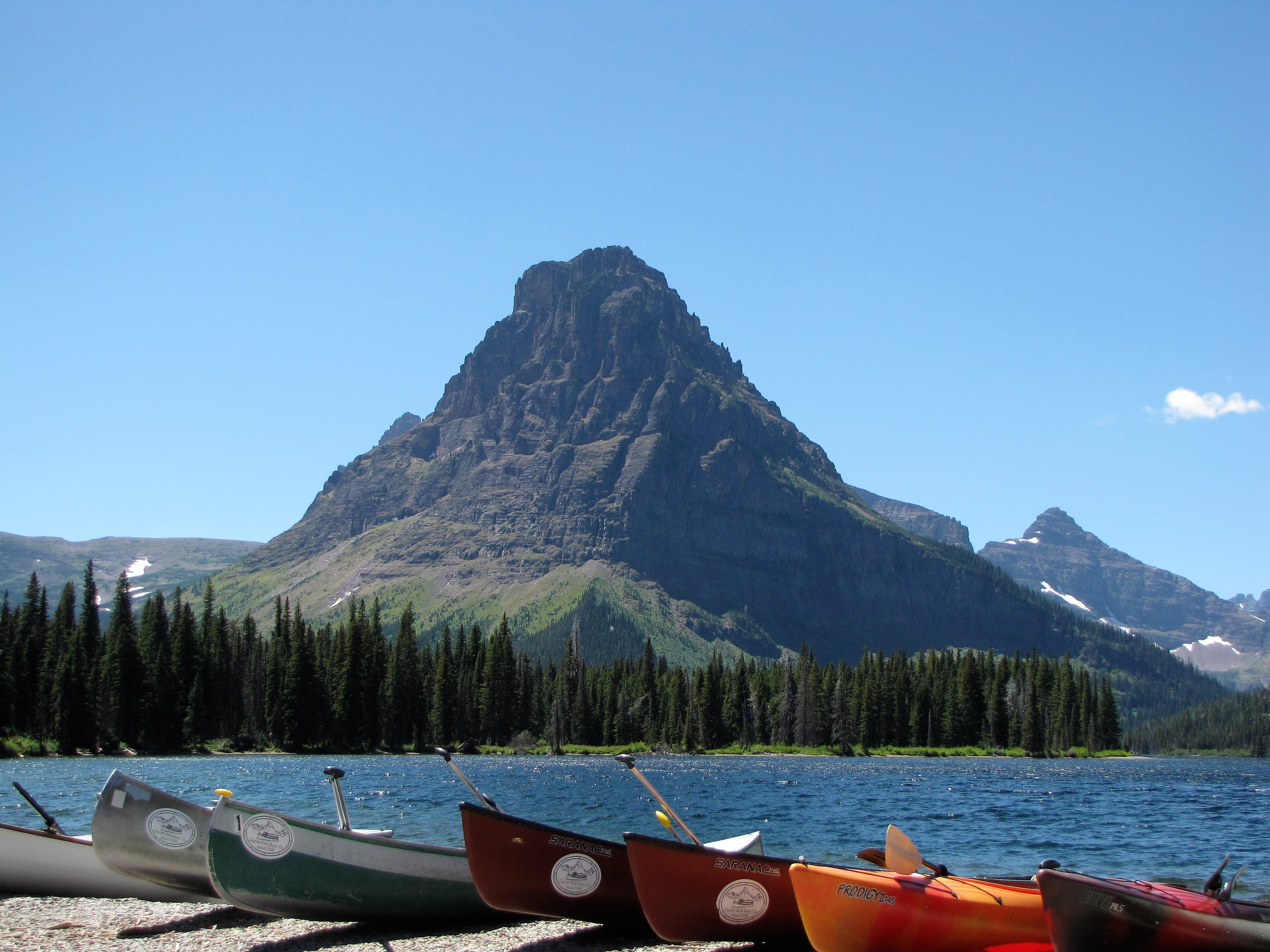
Sinopah and Two Medicine Lake

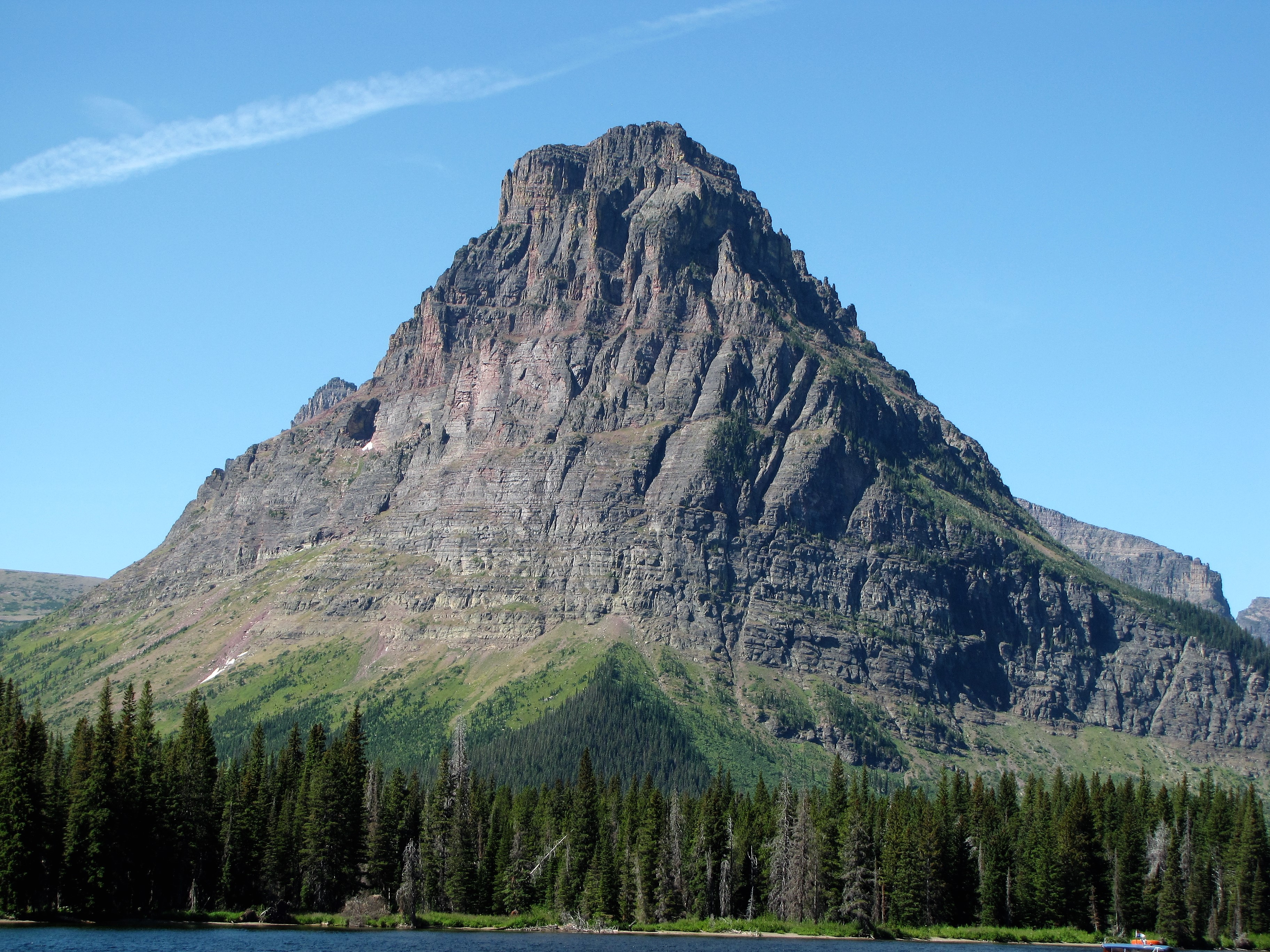
Sinopah

== See also ==
- Mountains and mountain ranges of Glacier National Park (U.S.)
