= Mount Helen (Montana) =

Mountain in Montana, United States

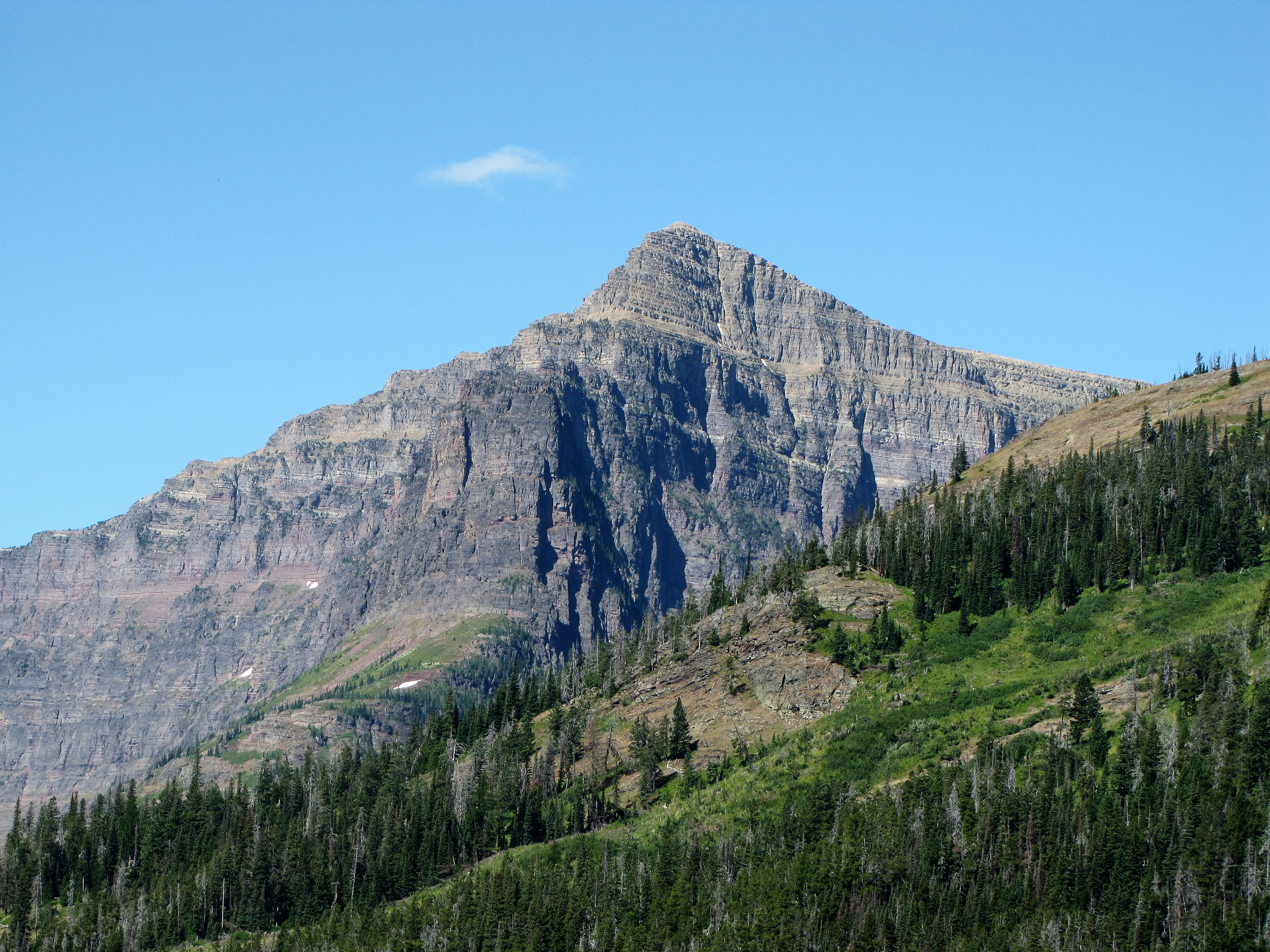
- Mount Helen from Two Medicine Valley

Highest point
- Elevation
- Prominence: 940 ft (290 m)
- Coordinates: 48°28′29″N 113°28′00″W

Geography
- Location within Montana Location within the United States
- Location: Glacier County / Flathead County; Montana, United States
- Parent range: Lewis Range
- Topo map: USGS Mount Rockwell

Climbing
- First ascent: Unknown
- Easiest route: Scramble

Mount Helen (8,538 feet (2,602 m)) is located in the Lewis Range, Glacier National Park in the U.S. state of Montana. Mount Helen rises immediately to the northwest roughly 3,100 feet (940 m) above Upper Two Medicine Lake in the southeastern part of Glacier National Park. The Continental Divide of the Americas passes over the summit of Mount Helen.

== Geology ==
Like the mountains in Glacier National Park, Mt. Helen is composed of sedimentary rock laid down during the Precambrian to Jurassic periods. Formed in shallow seas, this sedimentary rock was initially uplifted beginning 170 million years ago when the Lewis Overthrust fault pushed an enormous slab of precambrian rocks 3 mi (4.8 km) thick, 50 miles (80 km) wide and 160 miles (260 km) long over younger rock of the cretaceous period.

== Climate ==
Based on the Köppen climate classification, Mt. Helen is located in an alpine subarctic climate zone characterized by long, usually very cold winters, and short, cool to mild summers. Temperatures can drop below −10 °F with wind chill factors below −30 °F.

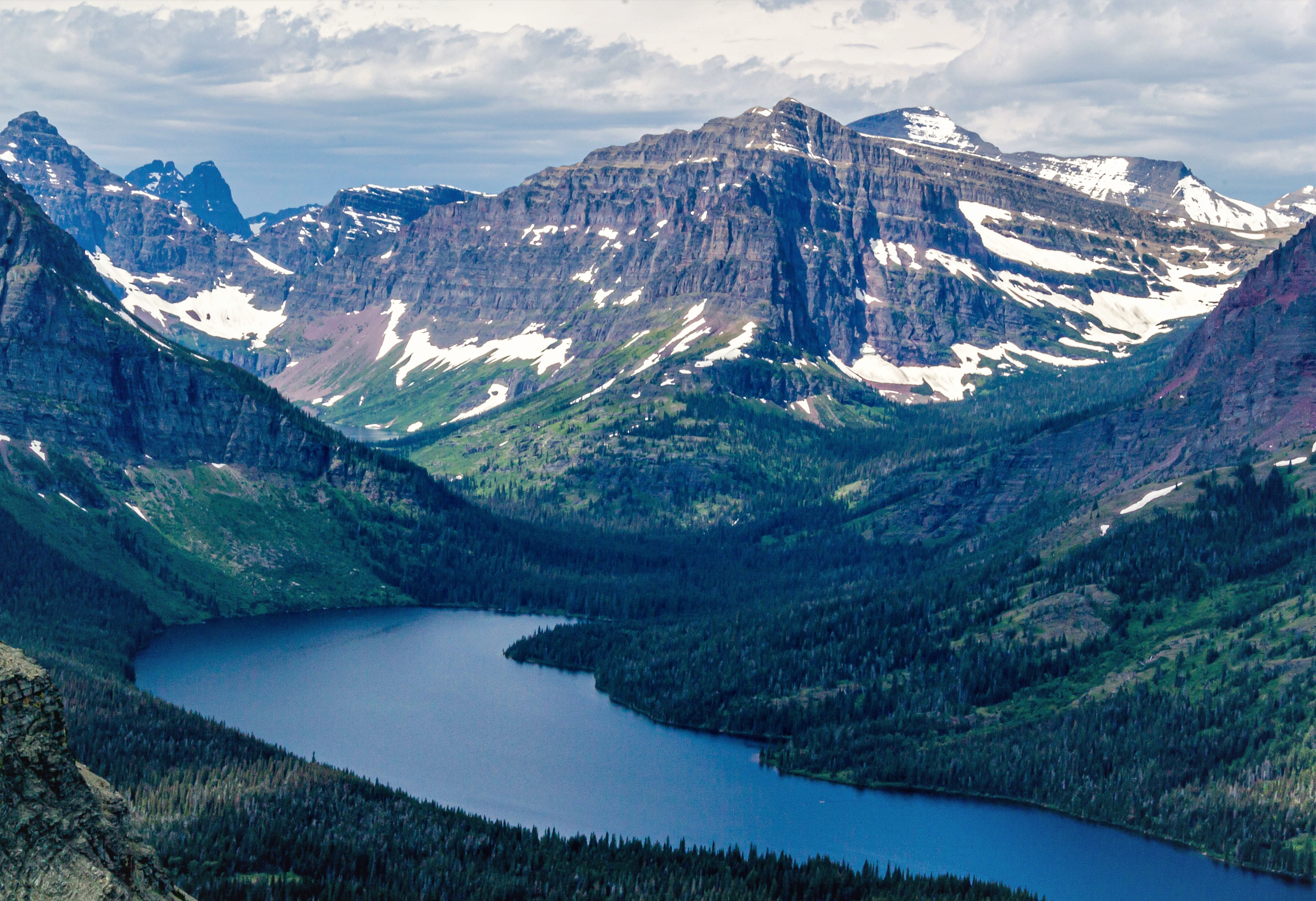
Mt. Helen and Two Medicine Lake seen from Scenic Point

== See also ==
- Mountains and mountain ranges of Glacier National Park (U.S.)
