= Lake of the Seven Winds =

Lake in Montana, United States

- Seven Winds of the Lake
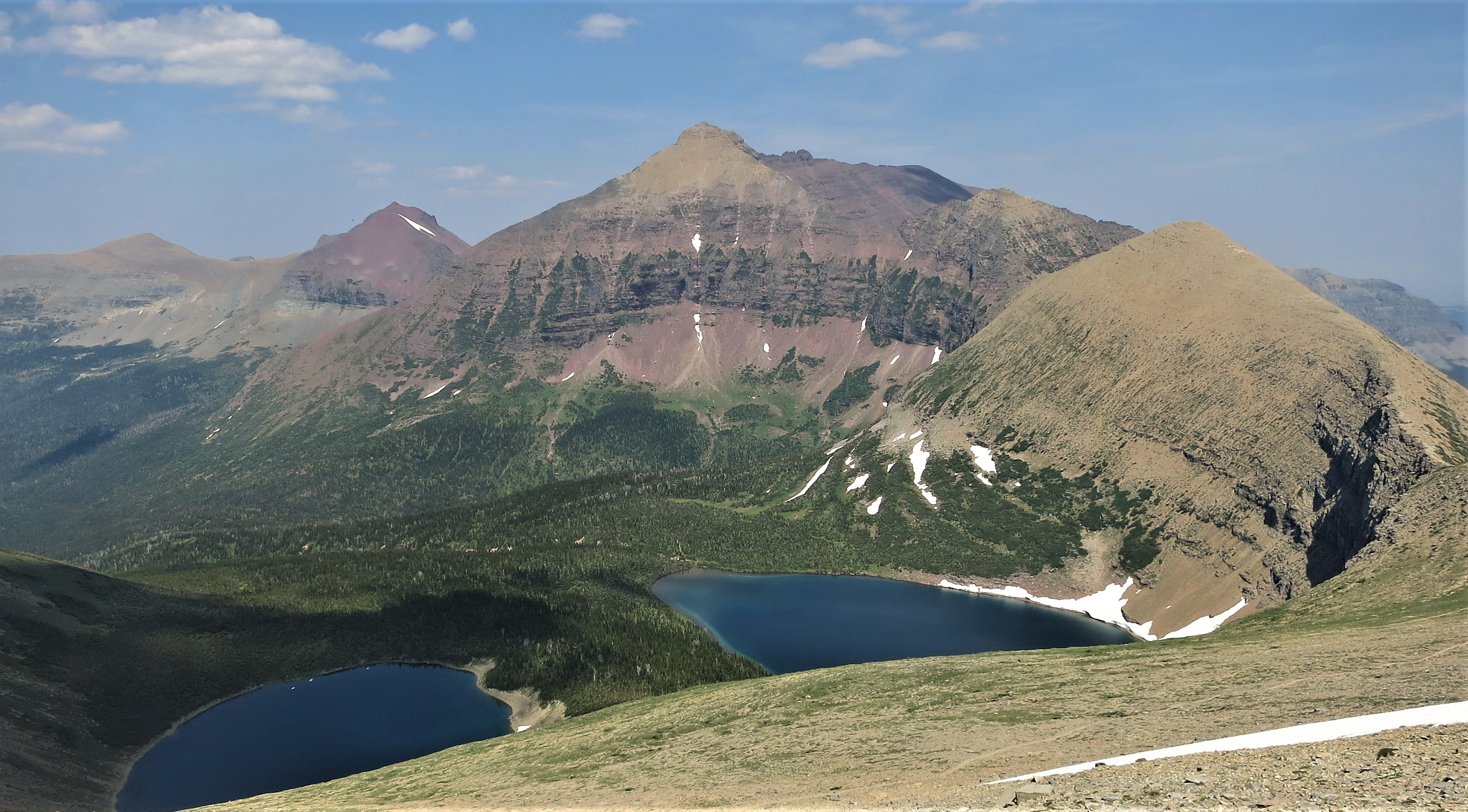
- Lake of the Seven Winds (left) and Pitamakan Lake (right). Red Mountain in the center.

- Location within Montana Location within the United States
- Location: Glacier National Park, Glacier County, Montana, US
- Coordinates: 48°31′24″N 113°27′54″W
- Type: Natural
- Basin countries: United States
- Max. length: .20 miles (0.32 km)
- Max. width: .15 miles (0.24 km)
- Surface elevation: 6,969 ft (2,124 m)

Lake of the Seven Winds (also listed as Seven Winds of the Lake) is located in Glacier National Park, in the U. S. state of Montana. The lake is northwest of Pitamakan Lake and east of McClintock Peak.

== See also ==
- List of lakes in Glacier County, Montana
