= Upper Two Medicine Lake =

Lake in the American state of Montana

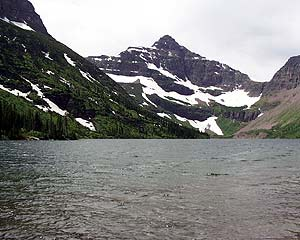
- Upper Two Medicine Lake and Lone Walker Mountain in background

- Location within Montana Location within the United States
- Location: Glacier National Park, Glacier County, Montana, US
- Coordinates: 48°27′50″N 113°27′43″W
- Type: Natural
- Basin countries: United States
- Max. length: 1.10 miles (1.77 km)
- Max. width: .20 miles (0.32 km)
- Surface elevation: 5,403 ft (1,647 m)

Upper Two Medicine Lake is located in Glacier National Park, in the U. S. state of Montana. The lake is just east of the Continental Divide in the Two Medicine region of Glacier National Park. Upper Two Medicine Lake is in a cirque and surrounded by a number of peaks including Lone Walker Mountain, Mount Helen and Pumpelly Pillar. Upper Two Medicine Lake is a 5 miles (8.0 km) hike from the Two Medicine Store.

== See also ==
- List of lakes in Glacier County, Montana
