= Oldman Lake =

Lake in the American state of Montana

- Oldman Lake as seen from the NNE. Flinsch Peak on the left. Mount Morgan on the right.

- Location within Montana Location within the United States
- Location: Glacier National Park, Glacier County, Montana, US
- Coordinates: 48°30′44″N 113°27′38″W
- Type: Natural
- Primary outflows: Dry Fork
- Basin countries: United States
- Max. length: .35 miles (0.56 km)
- Max. width: .25 miles (0.40 km)
- Surface elevation: 6,646 ft (2,026 m)

Oldman Lake is located in Glacier National Park, in the U. S. state of Montana. Oldman Lake is immediately east of Mount Morgan and north of Flinsch Peak. Oldman Lake is a 5.7-mile (9.2 km) hike from the Two Medicine Store.

A view from lakeside. Flinsch Peak on the left. Mount Morgan on the right.

== See also ==
- List of lakes in Glacier County, Montana
