= Mount Morgan (Montana) =

Mountain in Montana, United States

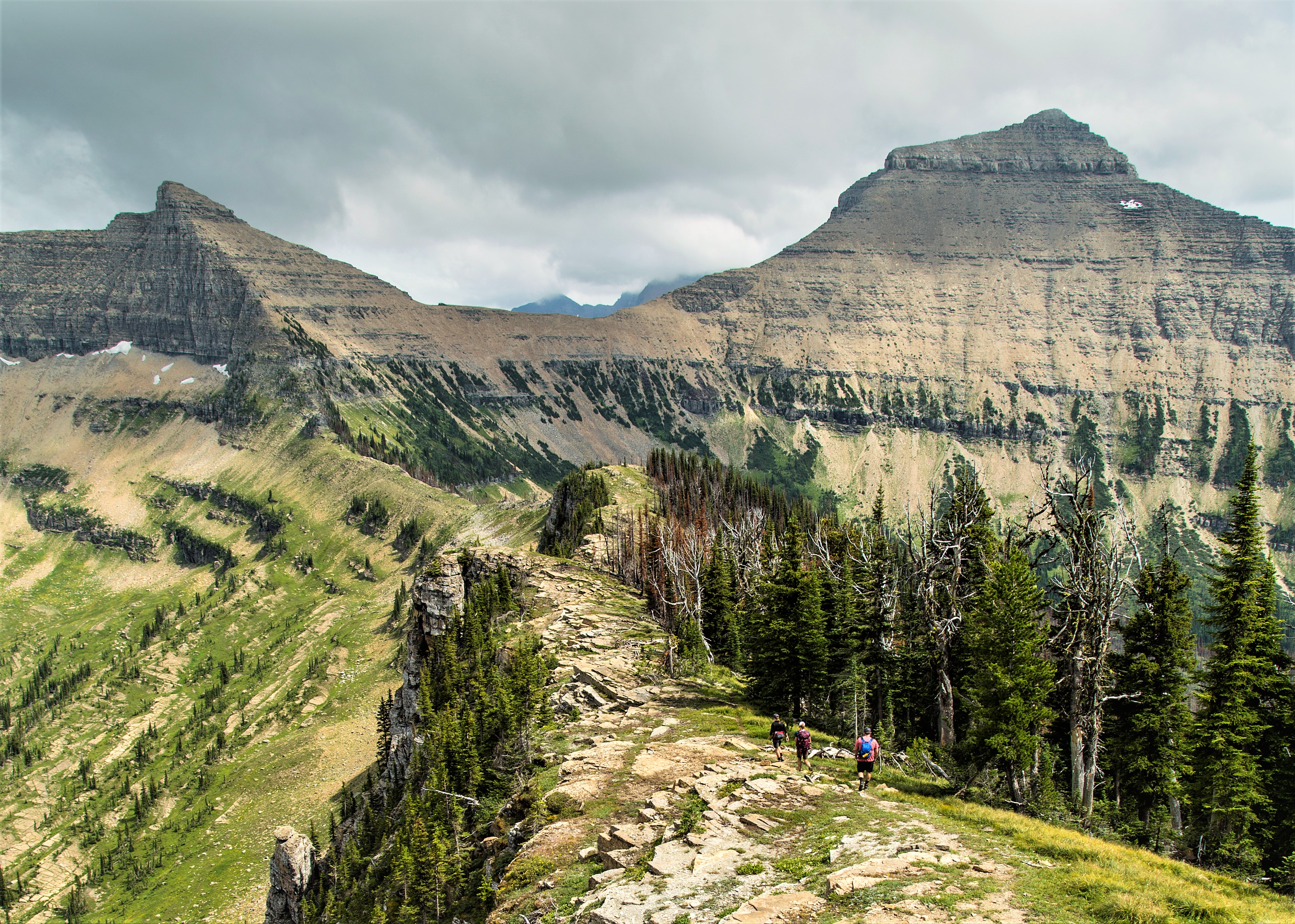
- Mount Morgan (right), west aspect

Highest point
- Elevation: 8,781 ft (2,676 m)
- Prominence: 941 ft (287 m)
- Coordinates: 48°30′50″N 113°28′21″W

Geography
- Location within Montana
- Location: Flathead County, Montana, Glacier County, Montana, U.S.
- Parent range: Lewis Range
- Topo map(s): USGS Cut Bank Pass, MT

Mount Morgan is an 8,781-foot elevation (2,676 m) mountain located in the Lewis Range, Glacier National Park in the U.S. state of Montana. It is situated along the Continental Divide. Oldman Lake is immediately east of the peak.

== Geology ==
Like other mountains in Glacier National Park, Mount Morgan is composed of sedimentary rock laid down during the Precambrian to Jurassic periods. Formed in shallow seas, this sedimentary rock was initially uplifted beginning 170 million years ago when the Lewis Overthrust fault pushed an enormous slab of precambrian rocks 3 miles (4.8 km) thick, 50 miles (80 km) wide and 160 miles (260 km) long over younger rock of the cretaceous period.

Flinsch Peak and Oldman Lake and Mount Morgan

== Climate ==
According to the Köppen climate classification system, the mountain is located in an alpine subarctic climate zone with long, cold, snowy winters, and cool to warm summers. Winter temperatures can drop below −10 °F (-23 °C) with wind chill factors below −30 °F (-34 °C). Due to its altitude, it receives precipitation all year, as snow in winter, and as thunderstorms in summer.

== See also ==
- Mountains and mountain ranges of Glacier National Park (U.S.)
