= Pitamakan Lake =

Lake in Glacier County, Montana, United States

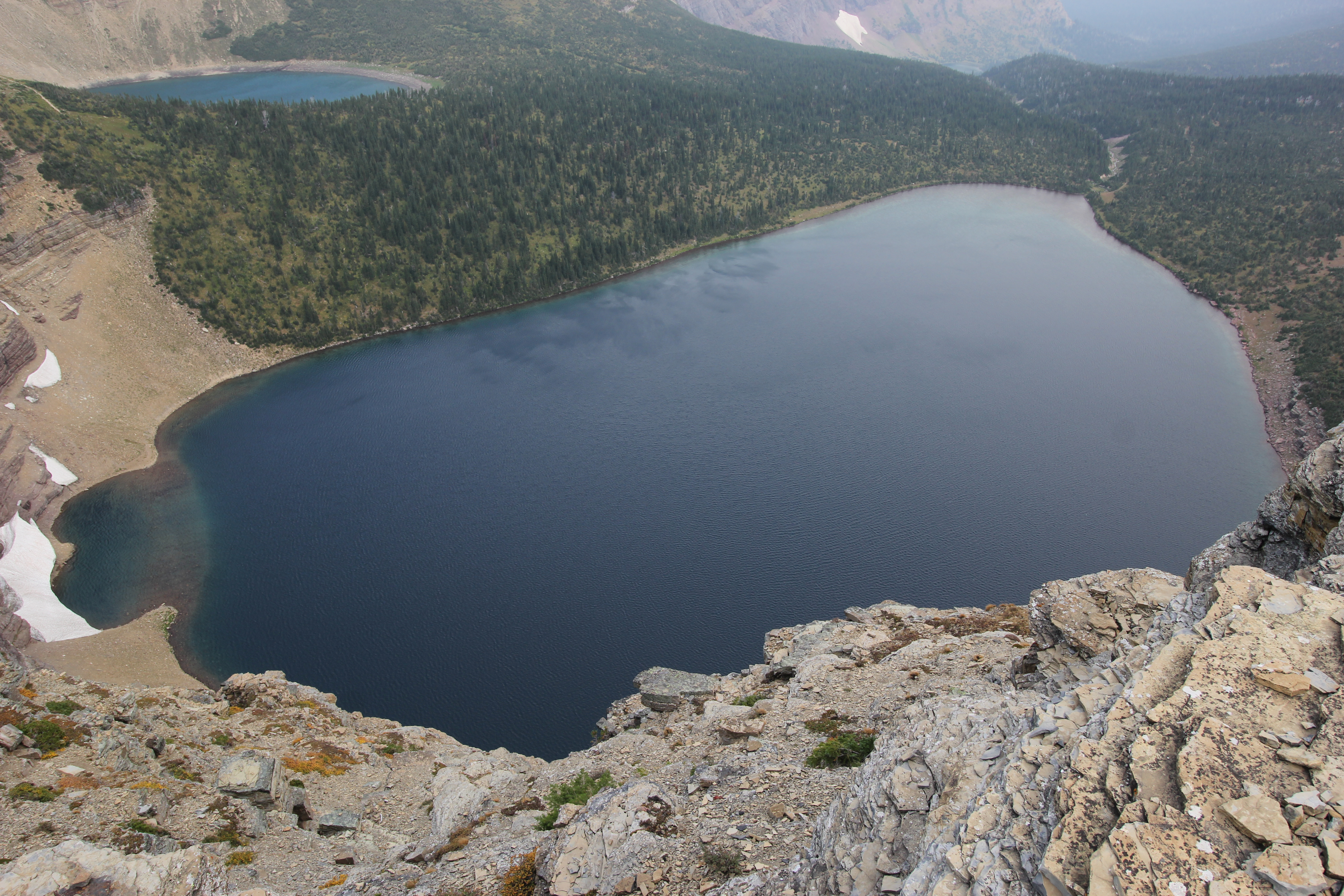
- Pitamakan Lake, looking north from Pitamakan Pass

- Location within Montana Location within the United States
- Location: Glacier National Park, Glacier County, Montana, US
- Coordinates: 48°31′18″N 113°27′26″W
- Type: Natural
- Primary outflows: North Fork Cut Bank Creek
- Basin countries: United States
- Max. length: .40 miles (0.64 km)
- Max. width: .25 miles (0.40 km)
- Surface elevation: 6,805 ft (2,074 m)

Pitamakan Lake is located in Glacier National Park, in the U. S. state of Montana. Pitamakan Pass is just south of the lake and the Lake of the Seven Winds is to the northwest.

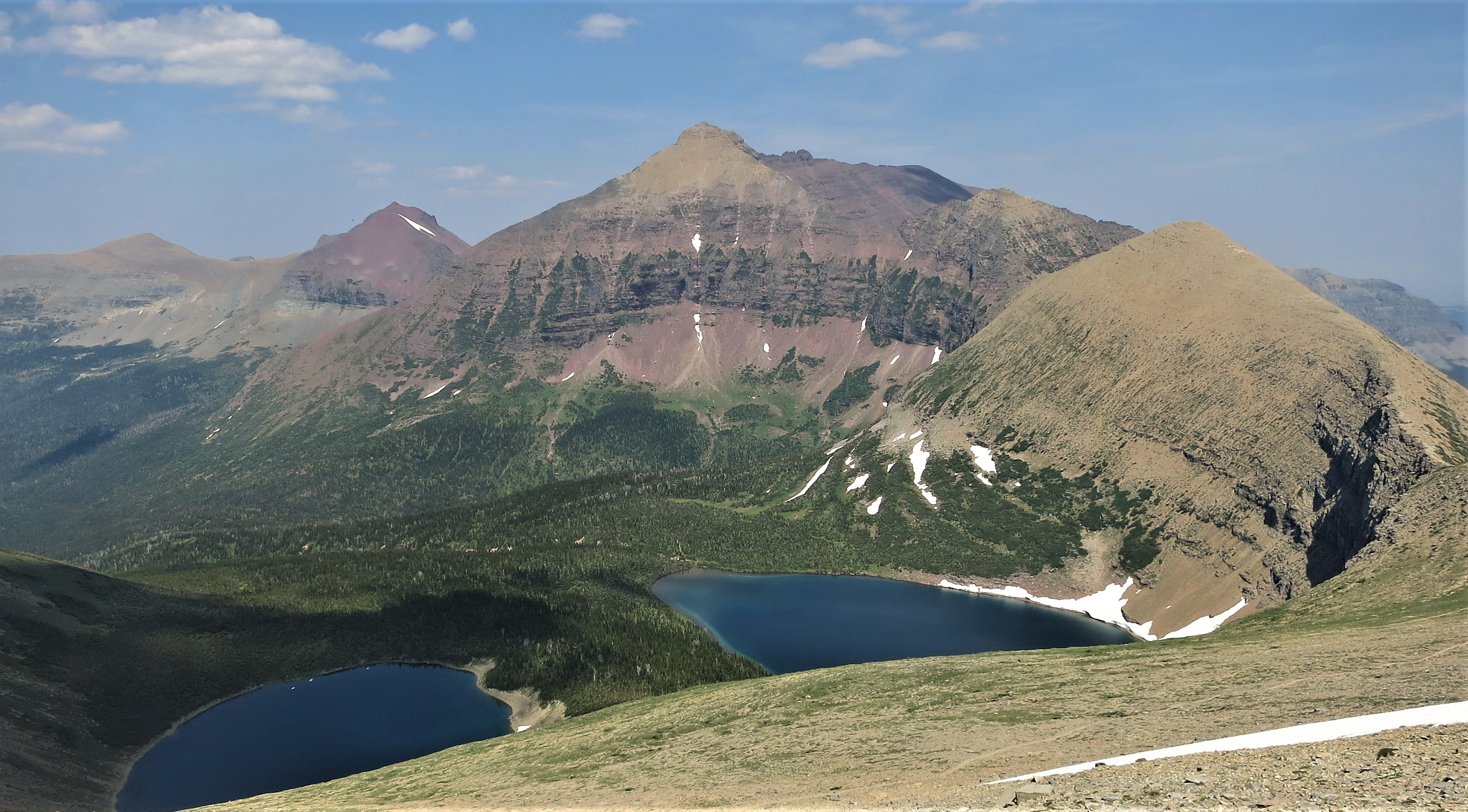
Red Mountain in the center. Lake of the Seven Winds on the left, Pitamakan Lake on the right.

== See also ==
- List of lakes in Glacier County, Montana
