= Flinsch Peak =

Mountain in Montana, United States

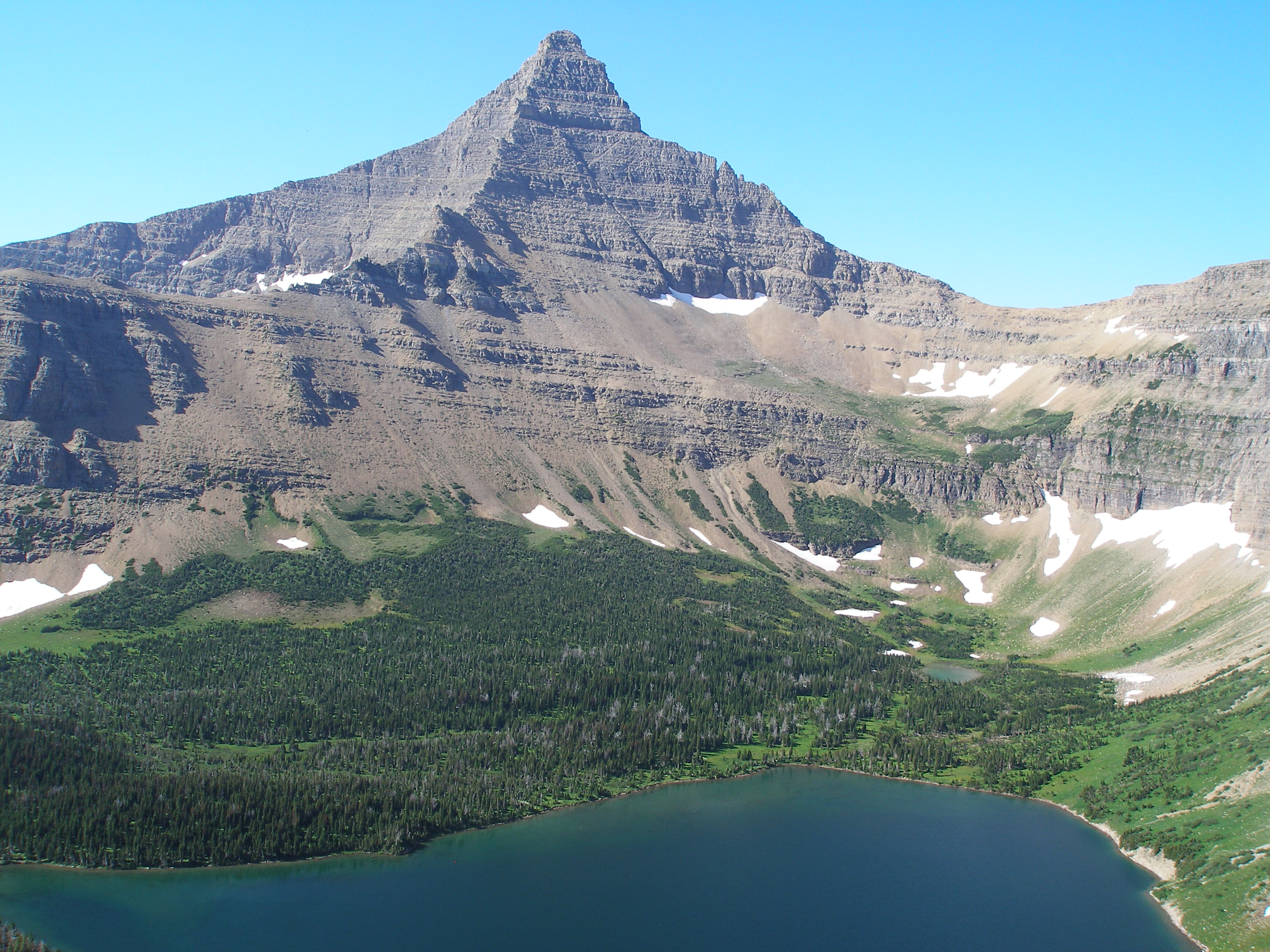
- Flinsch Peak above Oldman Lake

Highest point
- Elevation: 9,225 ft (2,812 m)
- Prominence: 1,145 ft (349 m)
- Coordinates: 48°29′54″N 113°27′58″W

Geography
- Location within Montana Location within the United States
- Location: Glacier and Flathead counties, Montana, U.S.
- Parent range: Lewis Range
- Topo map(s): USGS Mount Rockwell, MT

Climbing
- First ascent: Unknown
- Easiest route: Scramble

Flinsch Peak (9,225 ft (2,812 m)) is located in the Lewis Range, Glacier National Park in the U.S. state of Montana. It is 2.3 miles (3.7 km) west of Rising Wolf Mountain and straddles the Continental Divide. Viewed from Oldman Lake, the summit has a distinctive horn shape. Young Man Lake is immediately east of the peak.

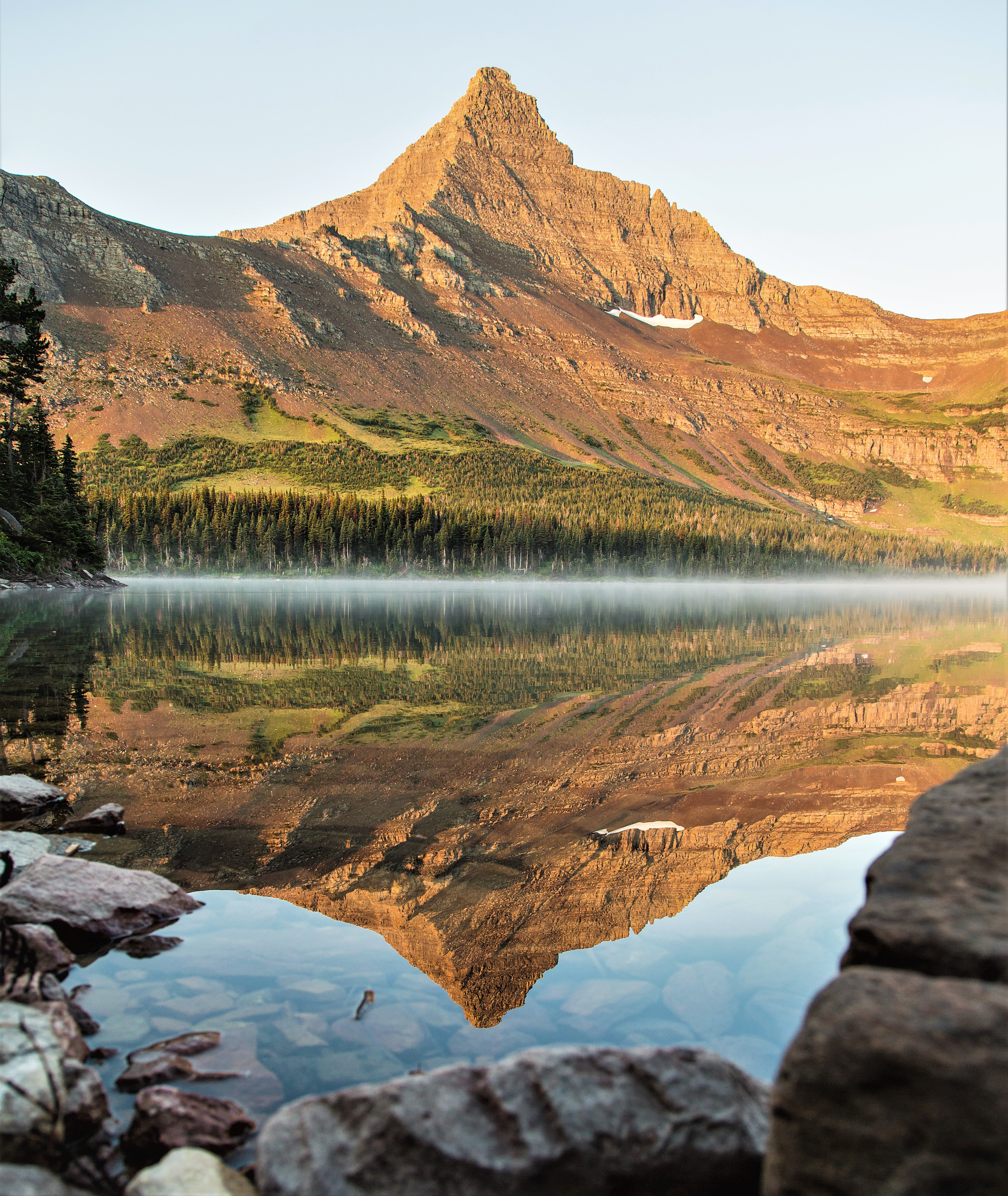
Flinsch Peak at sunrise reflected in Oldman Lake.

== See also ==
- Mountains and mountain ranges of Glacier National Park (U.S.)
