= Two Medicine Lake =

Lake in the American state of Montana

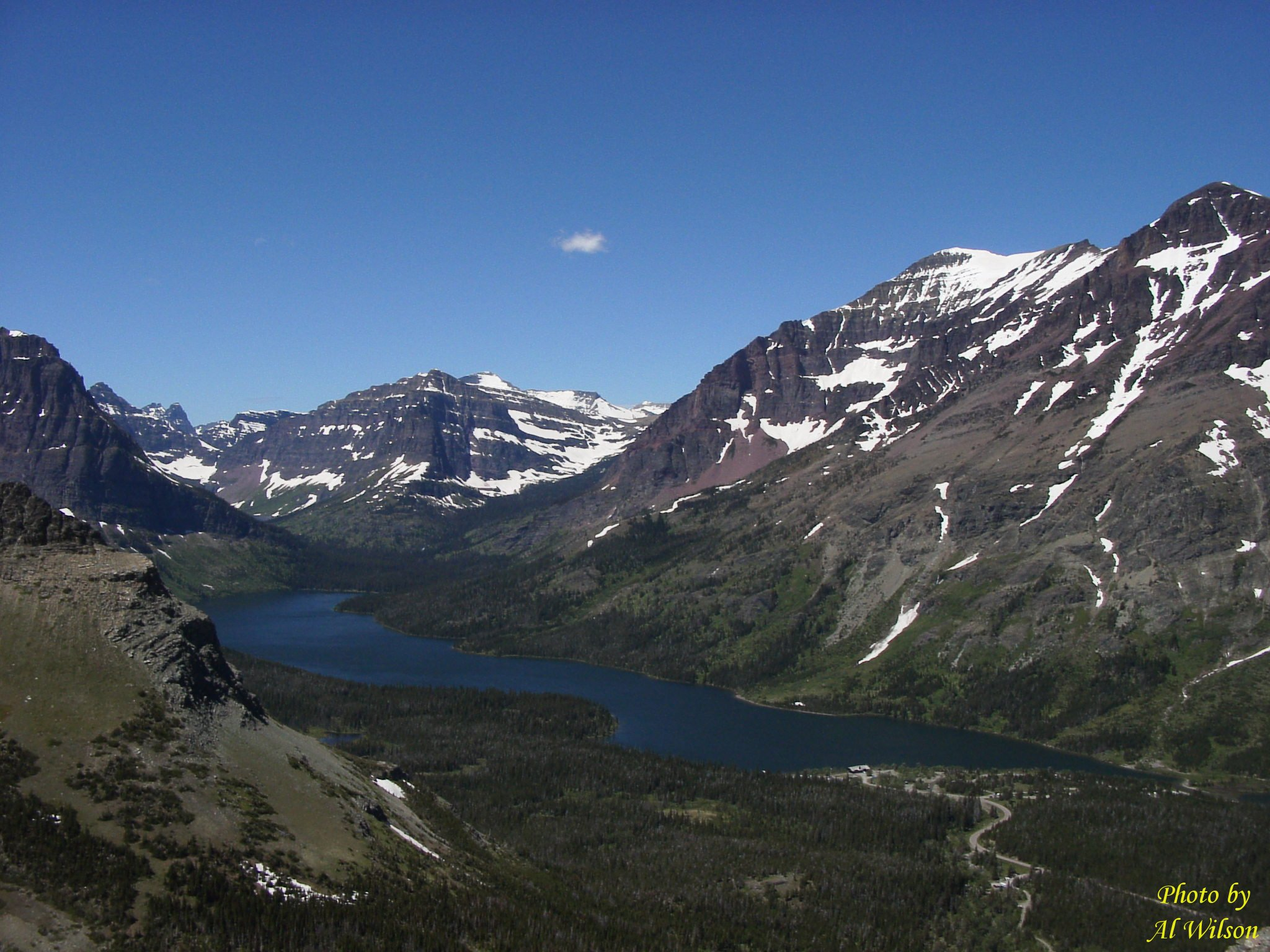
- From the east. Rising Wolf Mountain on the right. Mount Helen in the center left.

- Location within Montana Location within the United States
- Location: Glacier National Park, Glacier County, Montana, US
- Coordinates: 48°28′37″N 113°23′15″W
- Type: Natural
- Primary inflows: Two Medicine Creek
- Primary outflows: Two Medicine Creek
- Basin countries: United States
- Max. length: 2 miles (3.2 km)
- Max. width: .33 miles (0.53 km)
- Surface elevation: 5,164 ft (1,574 m)

Two Medicine Lake is located in Glacier National Park, in the U. S. state of Montana. It is approximately 2 miles (3.2 km) long and .33 miles (0.53 km) wide. Sinopah Mountain dominates the western terminus of the lake, while immediately to the north, Rising Wolf Mountain rises over 4,450 feet (1,360 m) above the lake. Several hiking trails begin at the eastern end of the lake, which is accessible by vehicle. The National Historic Landmark Two Medicine Store and the National Register of Historic Places Swanson Boathouse structures are also near the eastern side of the lake. A short outlet stream connects Two Medicine Lake with Pray Lake to the northeast.

Two Medicine Lake and Sinopah Mountain. Mount Helen on the right.

== See also ==
- List of lakes in Glacier County, Montana
