= Hugh Monroe =

Canadian trapper, guide, and interpreter

Hugh Monroe (1798-1892) was a Canadian trapper, guide, and interpreter. He worked for Hudson's Bay Company, American Fur Company, and independently throughout his life. He traveled with Chief Lone Walker of the Piikani Nation and was given the name "Rising Wolf" (Mah-kwi-i-po-ats – Wolf Rising), an ancestor of Lone Walker, with Rising Wolf Mountain later named after him.

== Biography ==
Monroe was born on July 9, 1798, in Trois-Rivières, Quebec. His father, Hugh Monroe (spelled Munro at the time), was a captain in the British Army and his grandfather was Capt. John Munro, a prominent loyalist. His mother, Angelique de la Roche, née Leroux, was the daughter of a royal family who was part of the French Emigration.

He attended English school in Montreal before moving on to a priest's college for four years, learning to speak both English and French. He began hunting at an early age and later and developed an interest for the outdoors. He later worked for Hudson's Bay Company where he worked as an apprentice-clerk in uncharted areas of modern-day Alberta. During a trip to Rocky Mountain Fort located near the headwaters of the Saskatchewan River east of the Rocky Mountains in May 1814 to July 1815, he was offered a job to travel with the Piikani Nation(Pi'ikanni (/pɪˈ-ɪ-kə-ni/)), to learn their language and customs.

Monroe traveled with the Pi'ikanni Nation under the care of Chief Lone Walker for two years and became a liaison between them and Hudson's. During his time with the Pi'ikanni, he became known as Makwi-poachsin ("Rising Wolf"). He worked with Hudson's until 1823 when he began working independently as a trapper and guide. From 1853-1854, Monroe served as a guide and interpreter for Governor Isaac Stevens who was the first to make a treaty with the Blackfoot Confederacy the following year in 1855.

For the next decade, Monroe and some of his family worked for the American Fur Company in Fort Benton, Montana. He worked as a trapper until the 1880s when he became too old to pursue the trade. He was reported to be living with two of his sons in 1890, on the lower Two Medicine River two miles below the Holy Family Mission.

== Life with the Piikani Nation ==
In 1814, at the age of 16, Hugh Munroe was assigned by the Hudson’s Bay Company to Rocky Mountain House in what is now central Alberta. As part of his role, he was directed to live with the Piikani Nation, a member of the Blackfoot Confederacy, to learn their language and culture. During this time, Munroe became fully integrated into Piikani society and eventually married Sinopah, the daughter of Chief Lone Walker, a respected Piikani leader.

Munroe participated in the Piikani’s traditional seasonal practices, including buffalo hunting, plant gathering, and fishing in the region surrounding Rocky Mountain House. He accompanied his wife and her father in harvesting activities and ceremonies, and the knowledge he gained was passed down to their children and descendants.

== Legacy ==
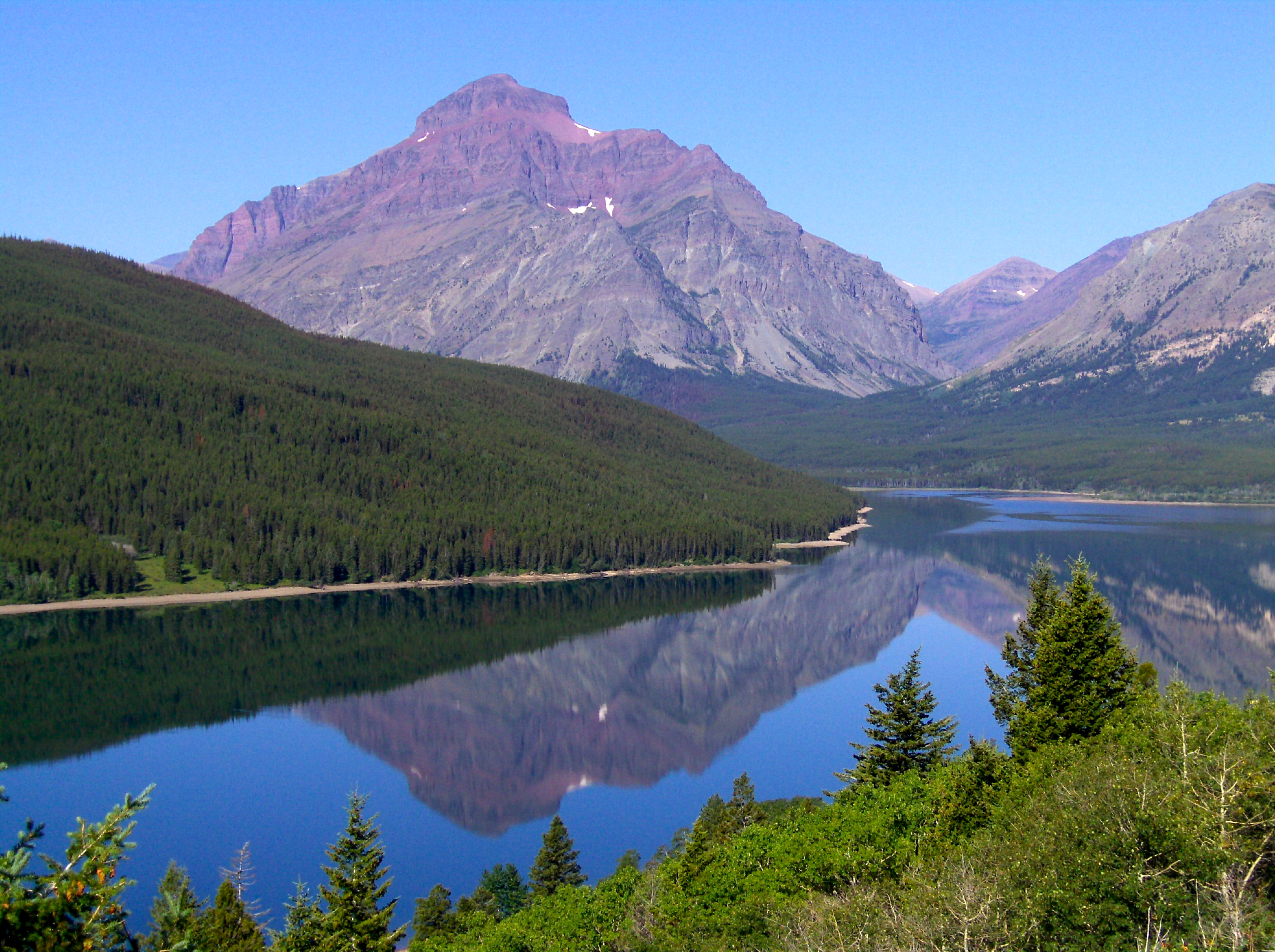
Image of Rising Wolf Mountain, named after Hugh Monroe

Rising Wolf Mountain (Mah-kwi-i-po-ats-ists – Wolf Rising Mountain), was named after Monroe. After his death, his close friend and author James Willard Schultz named the peak after Monroe. He was also referred to as the "White Blackfoot."

== Personal life ==
Monroe was married to Sinopah (Sinopahaki - Kit Fox Woman), a Blackfoot Confederacy woman, with whom he had 10 children. He died of old age on December 8, 1892. He is the grandfather of William Jackson for whom Jackson Glacier is named.
