= Lone Walker Mountain =

Mountain in Montana, United States

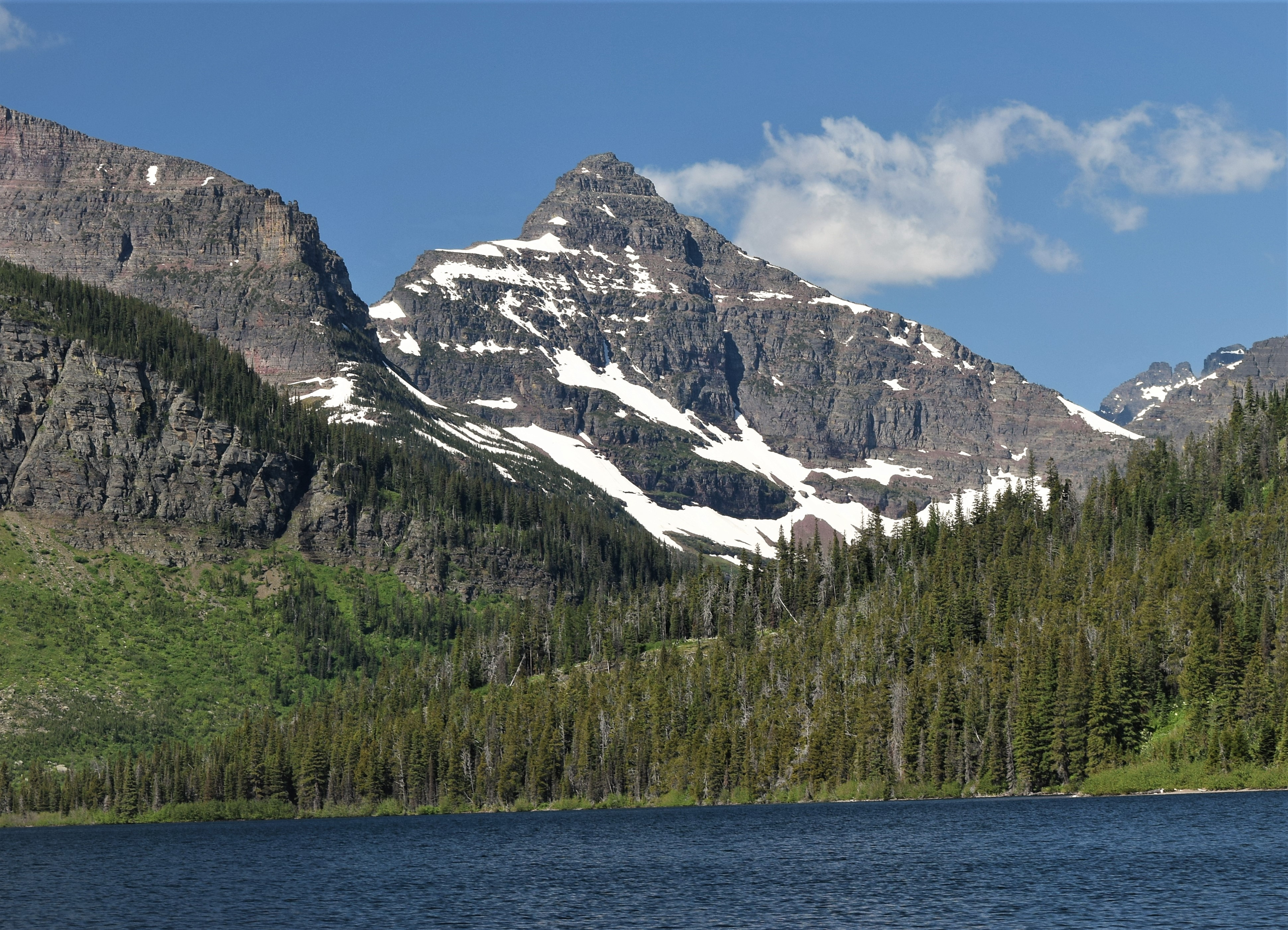
- Lone Walker Mountain from Two Medicine Lake

Highest point
- Elevation: 8,502 ft (2,591 m)
- Prominence: 822 ft (251 m)
- Coordinates: 48°27′12″N 113°28′44″W

Geography
- Location within Montana Location within the United States
- Location: Flathead County, Montana, Glacier County, Montana, U.S.
- Parent range: Lewis Range
- Topo map: USGS

Lone Walker Mountain (8,502 feet (2,591 m)) is located in the Lewis Range, Glacier National Park in the U.S. state of Montana. Lone Walker Mountain is situated immediately southwest of Upper Two Medicine Lake along the Continental Divide.

== Climate ==
Based on the Köppen climate classification, it is located in an alpine subarctic climate zone with long, cold, snowy winters, and cool to warm summers. Temperatures can drop below −10 °F with wind chill factors below −30 °F.

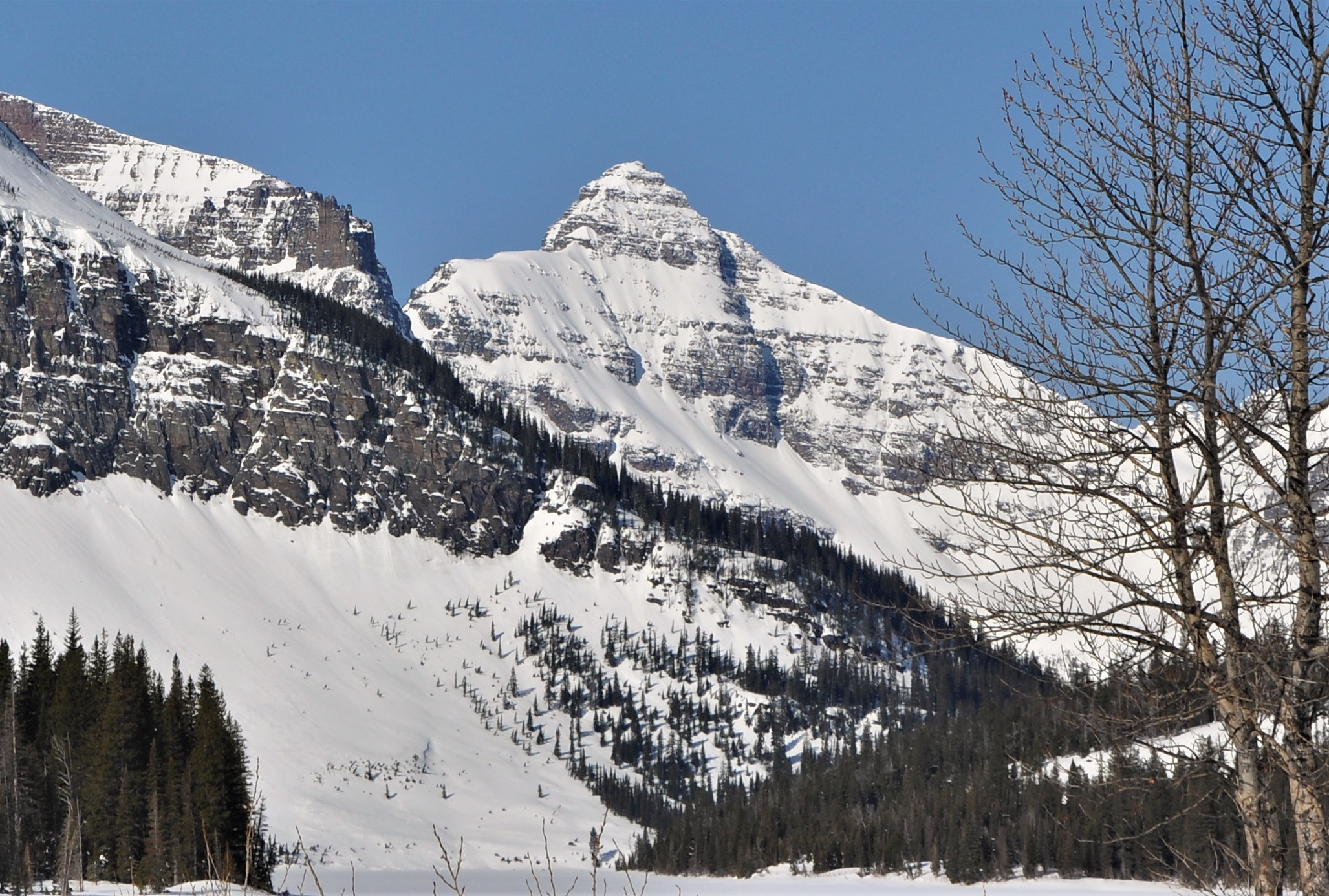
Lone Walker Mountain in spring

== Geology ==
Like other mountains in Glacier National Park, it is composed of sedimentary rock laid down during the Precambrian to Jurassic periods. Formed in shallow seas, this sedimentary rock was initially uplifted beginning 170 million years ago when the Lewis Overthrust fault pushed an enormous slab of precambrian rocks 3 mi (4.8 km) thick, 50 miles (80 km) wide and 160 miles (260 km) long over younger rock of the cretaceous period.

== See also ==
- Mountains and mountain ranges of Glacier National Park (U.S.)
