= Rising Wolf Mountain =

Mountain in Montana, United States

Rising Wolf mountain
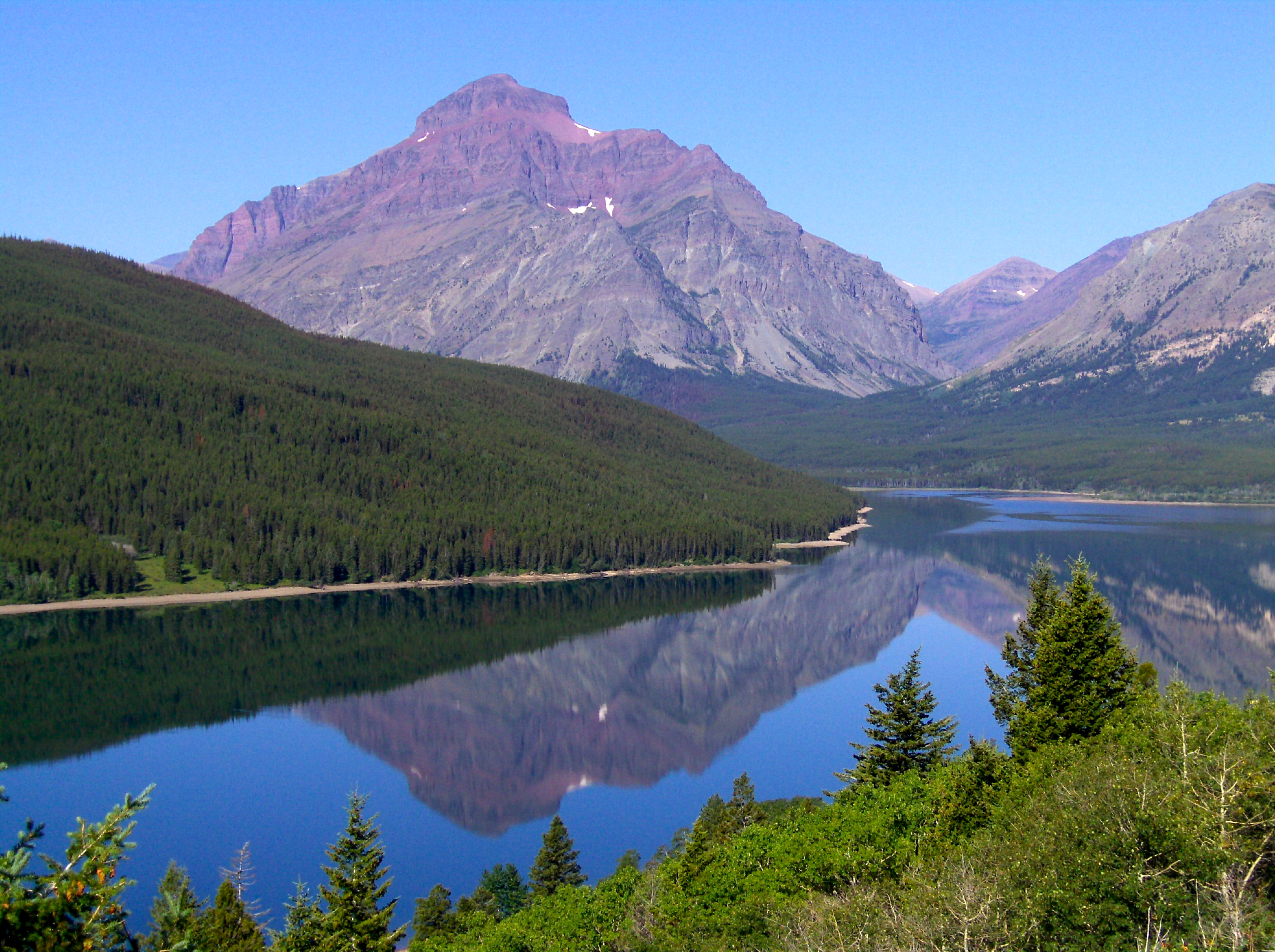
- Rising Wolf Mountain seen from Lower Two Medicine Lake

Highest point
- Elevation: 9,513 ft (2,900 m)
- Prominence: 2,873 ft (876 m)
- Parent peak: Blackfoot Mountain
- Listing: Mountains in Glacier County, Montana
- Coordinates: 48°29′46″N 113°24′58″W

Geography
- Location within Montana Location within the United States
- Location: Glacier County, Montana, U.S.
- Parent range: Lewis Range
- Topo map(s): USGS Mount Rockwell, MT

Climbing
- First ascent: 1923 (Norman Clyde)
- Easiest route: Scramble

Rising Wolf Mountain - Mah-kwi-i-po-ats-ists (Wolf Rising Mountain), (9,513 feet (2,900 m)) is located in the Lewis Range, Glacier National Park in the U.S. state of Montana. The peak is in the southeastern section of the park and rises dramatically above the Two Medicine region and more than 4,450 ft (1,360 m) above Two Medicine Lake immediately to the south. The Blackfeet consider the Two Medicine region of the park to be sacred ground and their name for the peak, "Mah-kwi-i-po-ats-sin", meaning, The way the wolf gets up, was later translated to the current name of the mountain.

Rising Wolf Mountain was named after Hugh Monroe, a fur trader who lived with the Pikunis and gave him the name Rising Wolf. After his death, his close friend and author James Willard Schultz named the peak after Monroe.

== Climate ==
Based on the Köppen climate classification, the peak is located in an alpine subarctic climate zone with long, cold, snowy winters, and cool to warm summers. Temperatures can drop below −10 °F with wind chill factors below −30 °F.

== Geology ==
Like other mountains in Glacier National Park, the peak is composed of sedimentary rock laid down during the Precambrian to Jurassic periods. Formed in shallow seas, this sedimentary rock was initially uplifted beginning 170 million years ago when the Lewis Overthrust fault pushed an enormous slab of precambrian rocks 3 mi (4.8 km) thick, 50 miles (80 km) wide and 160 miles (260 km) long over younger rock of the cretaceous period.

== Gallery ==
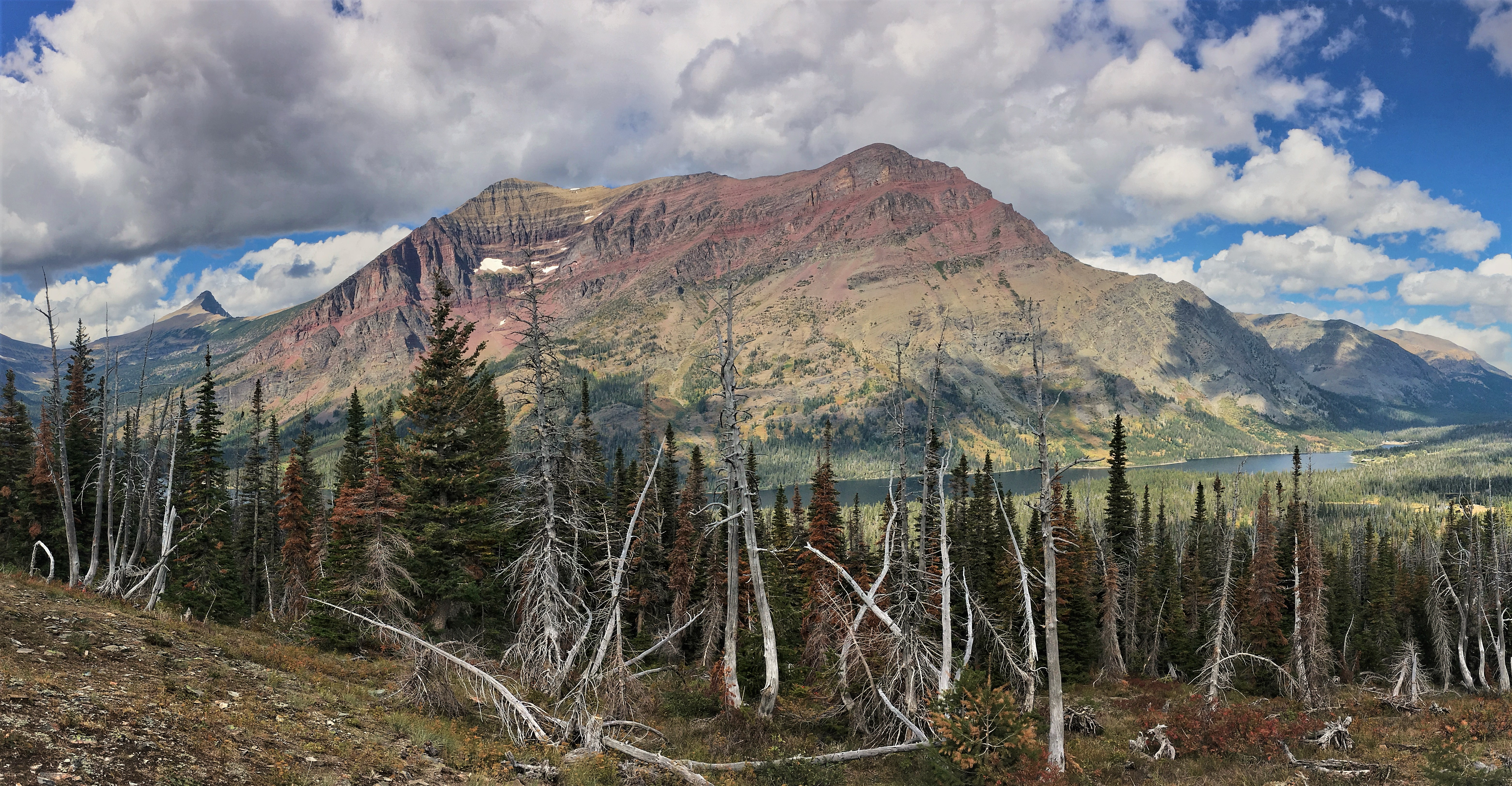
South aspect

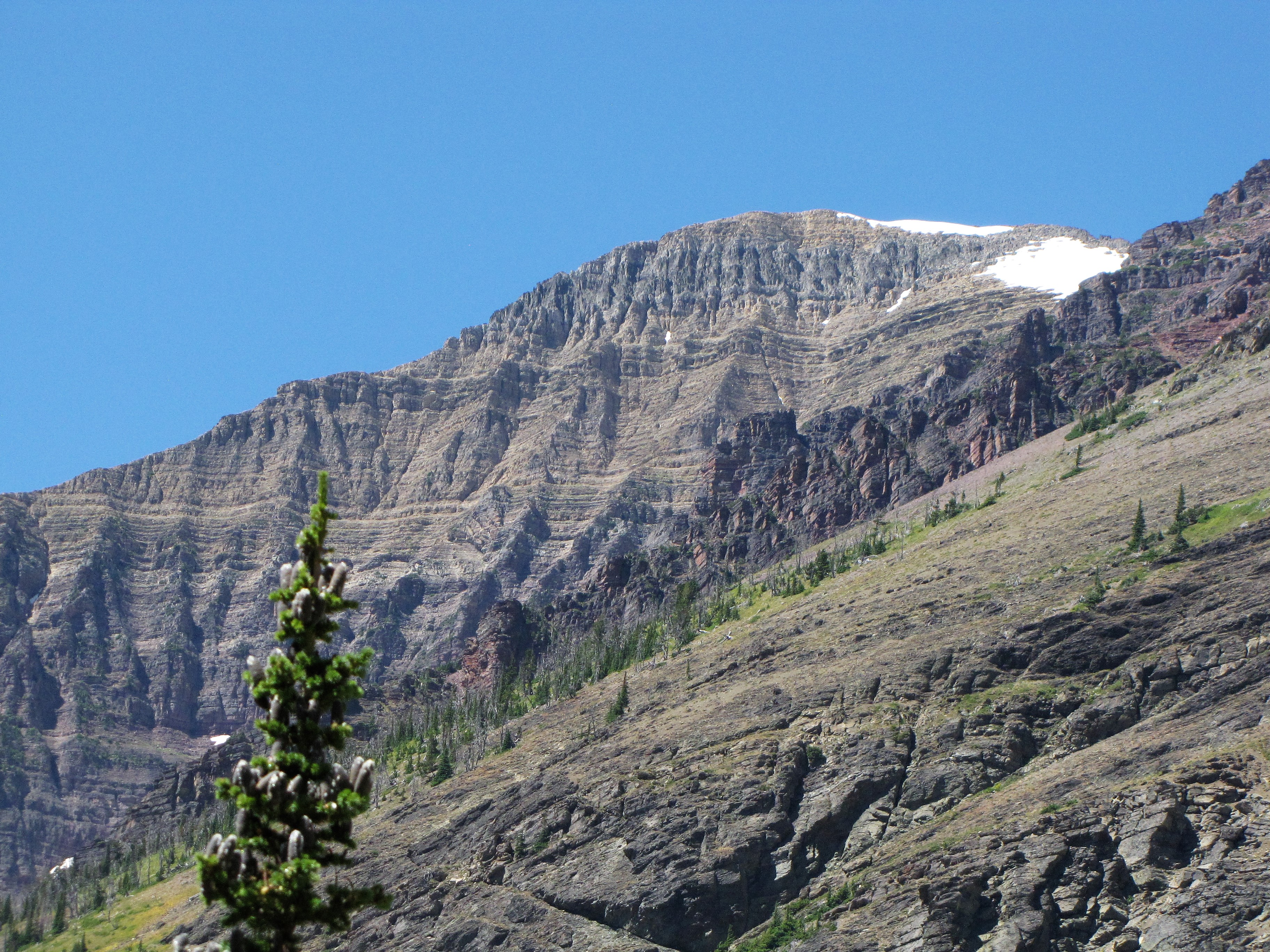
Summit of Rising Wolf Mountain as seen from Two Medicine Lake

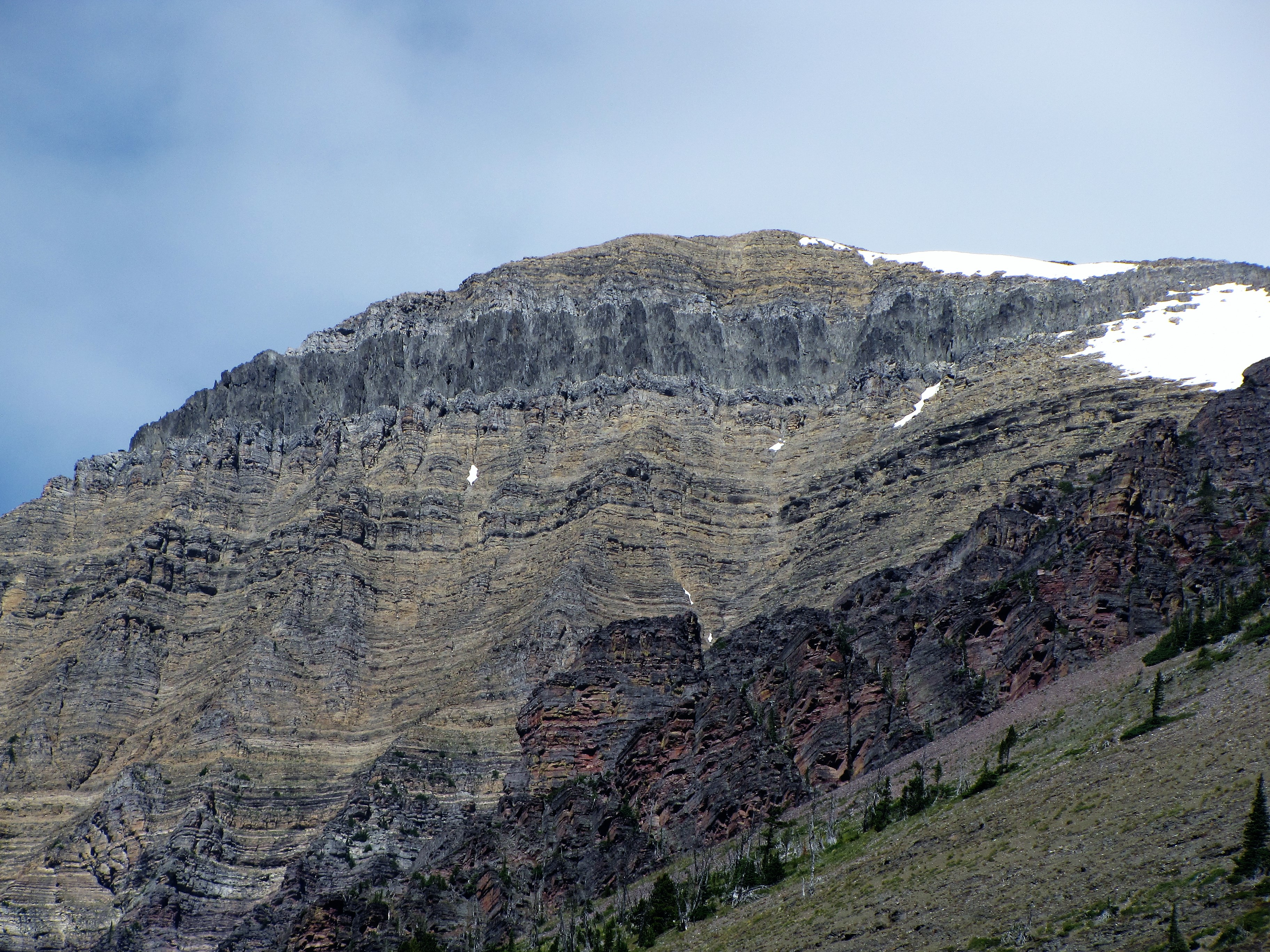
Closer summit image from the south

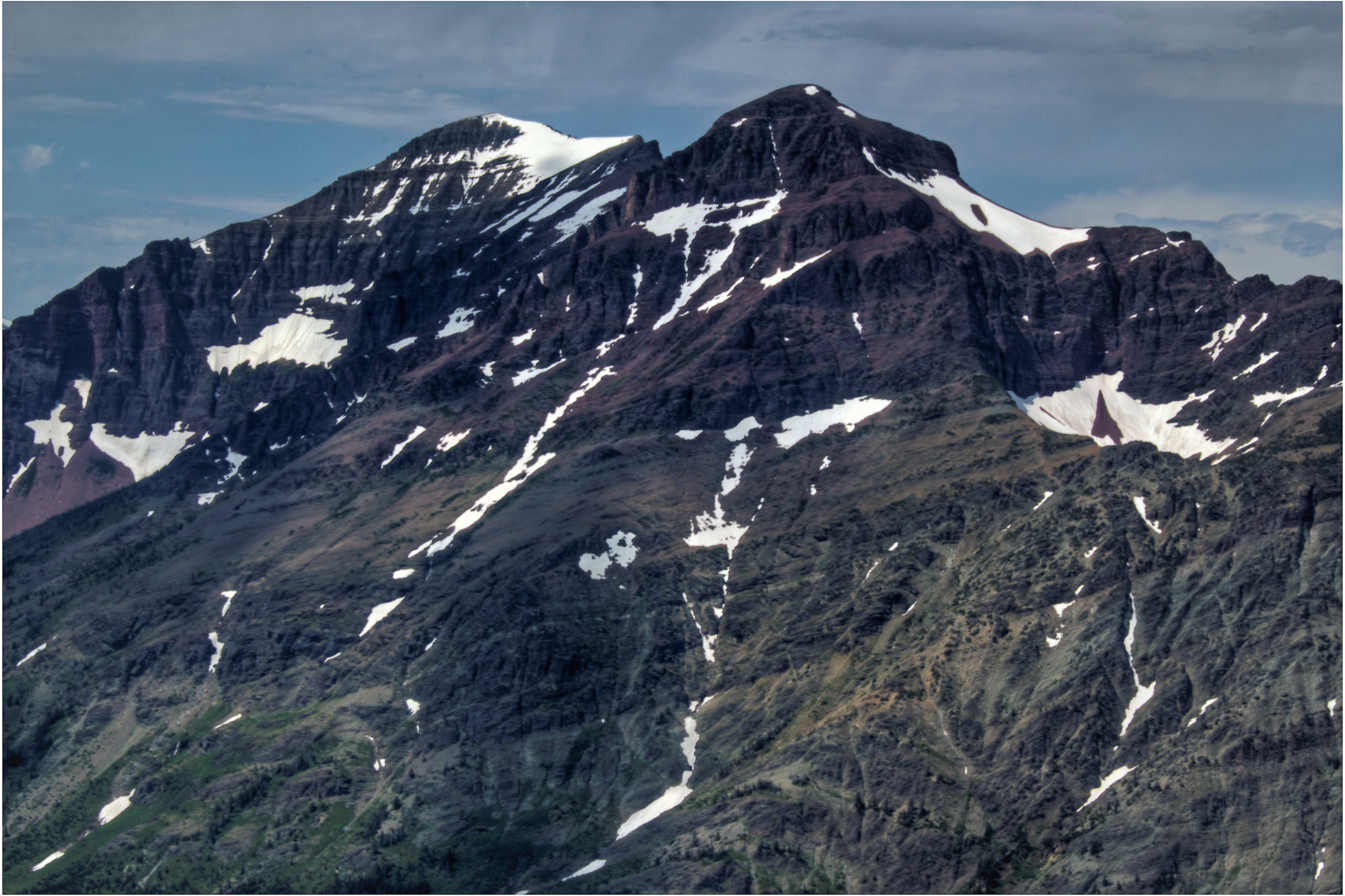
Rising Wolf Mountain, summit to left

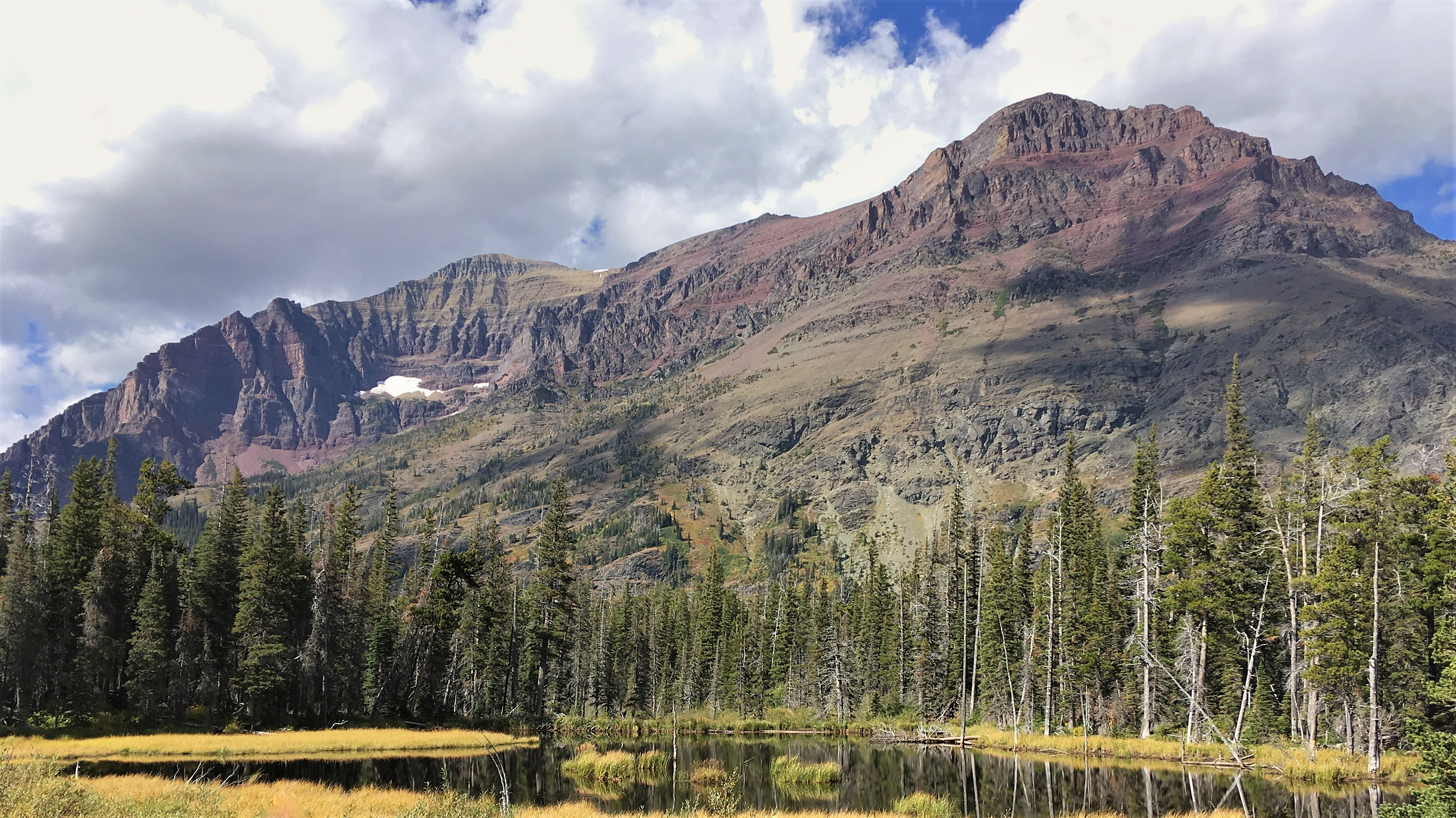
Rising Wolf Mountain, summit to left

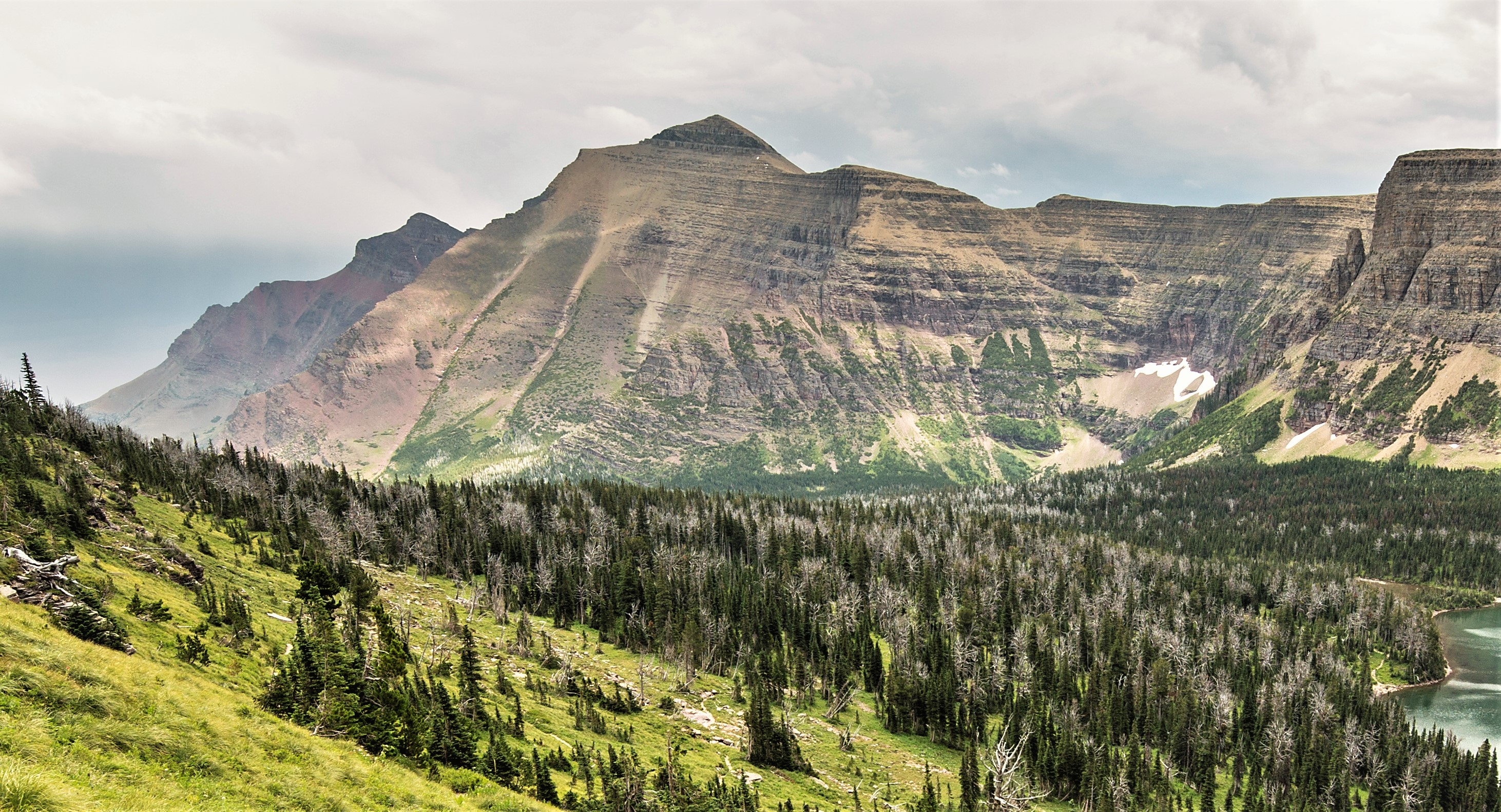
Northwest aspect

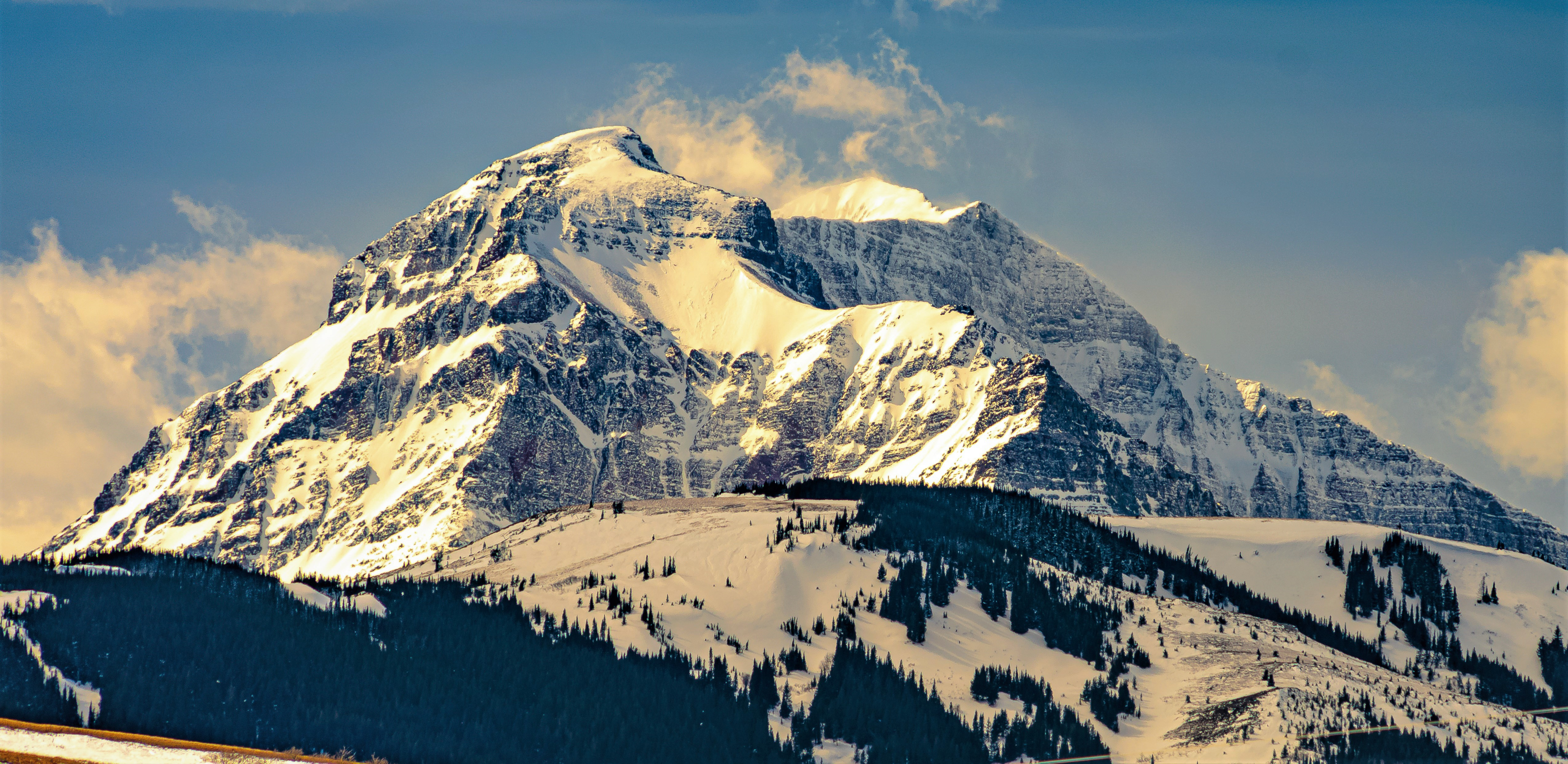
East aspect in winter

== See also ==
- List of mountains and mountain ranges of Glacier National Park (U.S.)
