= Cracker Lake =

Lake in US state of Montana

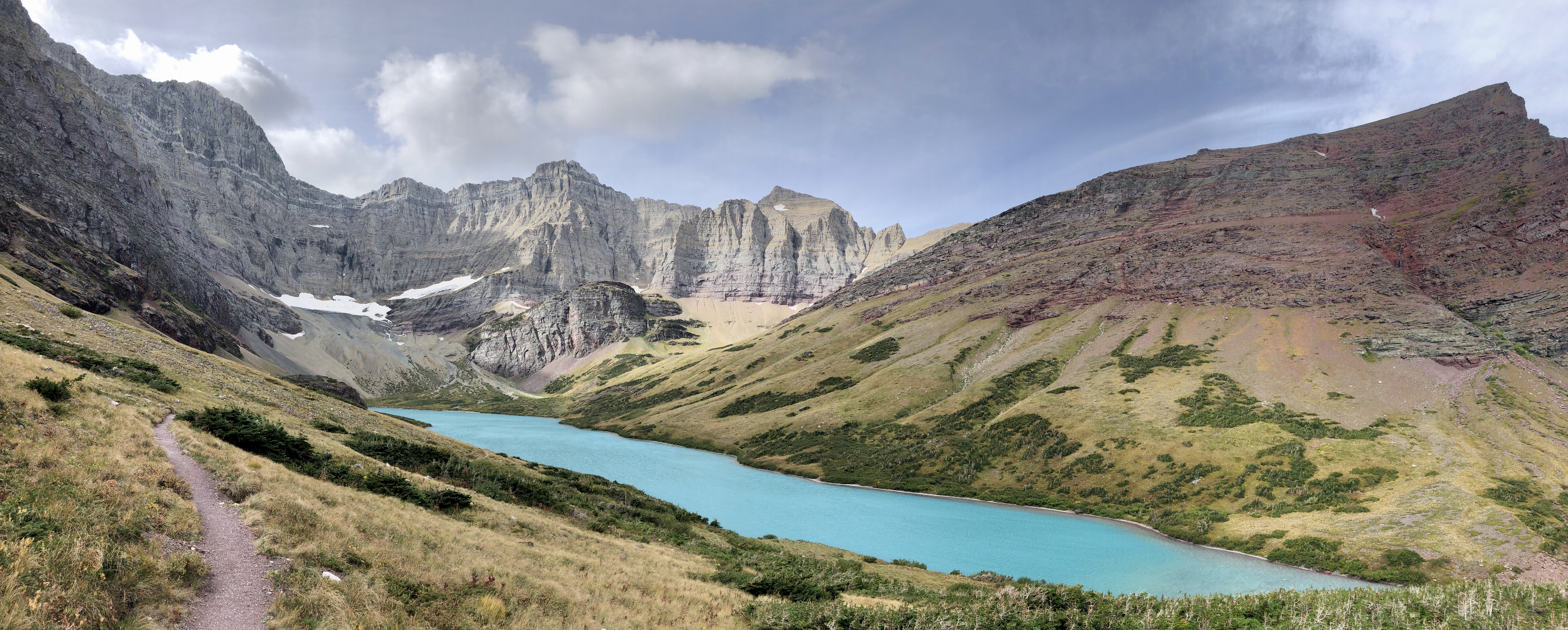
- Cracker Lake with Mount Siyeh (left). Allen Mountain (right)

- Location within Montana Location within the United States
- Location: Glacier National Park, Glacier County, Montana, United States
- Coordinates: 48°44′40″N 113°38′35″W
- Lake type: Natural
- Primary inflows: Canyon Creek
- Primary outflows: Canyon Creek
- Basin countries: United States
- Max. length: .60 miles (0.97 km)
- Max. width: .15 miles (0.24 km)
- Surface elevation: 5,910 ft (1,800 m)

Cracker Lake is located in Glacier National Park, in the U. S. state of Montana. Located at the head of a canyon, the waters of Cracker Lake are an opaque turquoise from rock flour (silt) originating from Siyeh Glacier. To the south of Cracker Lake lies Mount Siyeh which rises more than 4,000 feet (1,200 m) above the lake. Cracker Peak to the southeast and Allen Mountain to the north are other prominent peaks nearby. Cracker Lake is a 6.1-mile (9.8 km) hike from the Many Glacier Hotel.

== Gallery ==
Cracker Lake and the ridge from Mount Siyeh to Allen Mountain

With Allen Mountain (left)

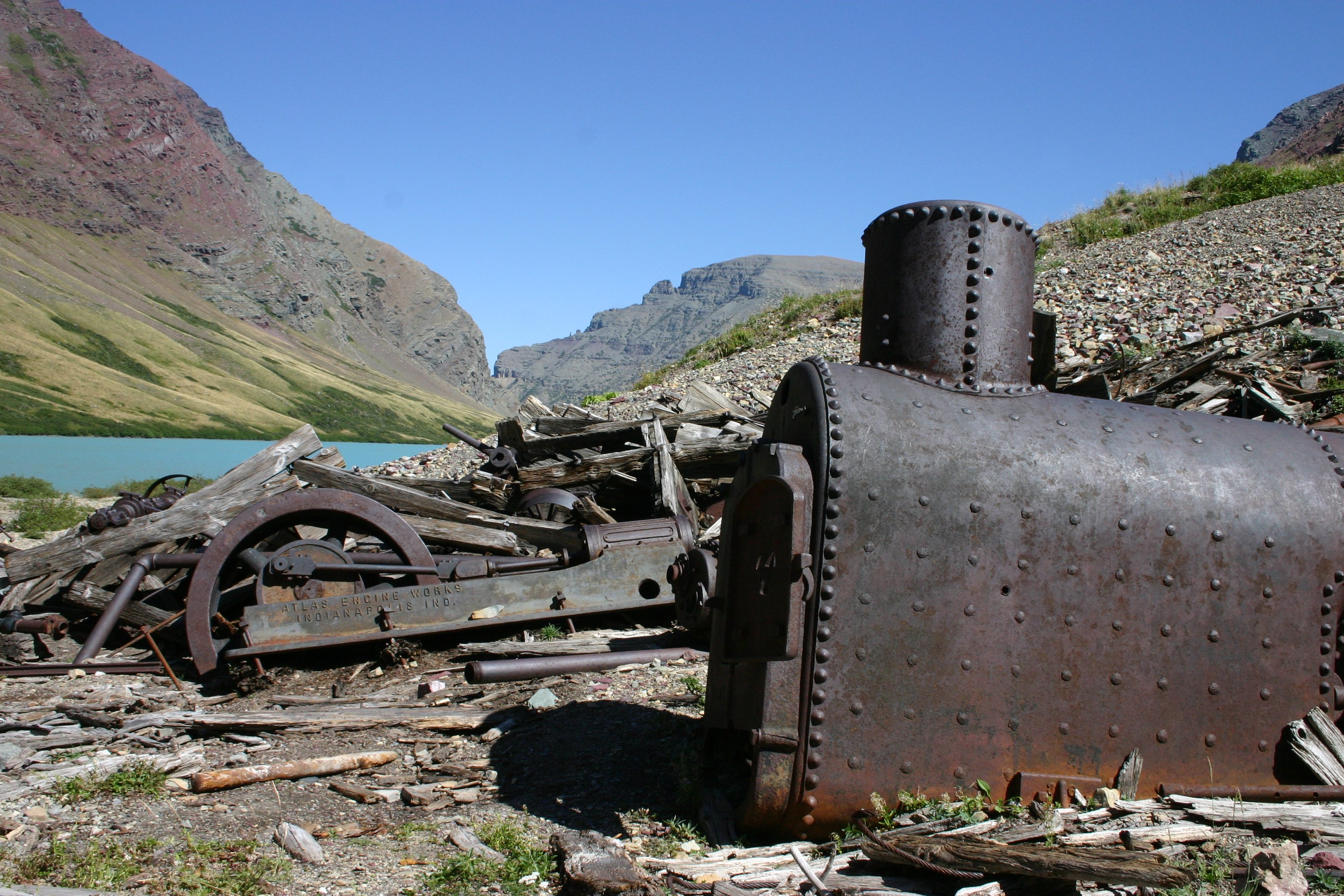
Mining equipment at the lake

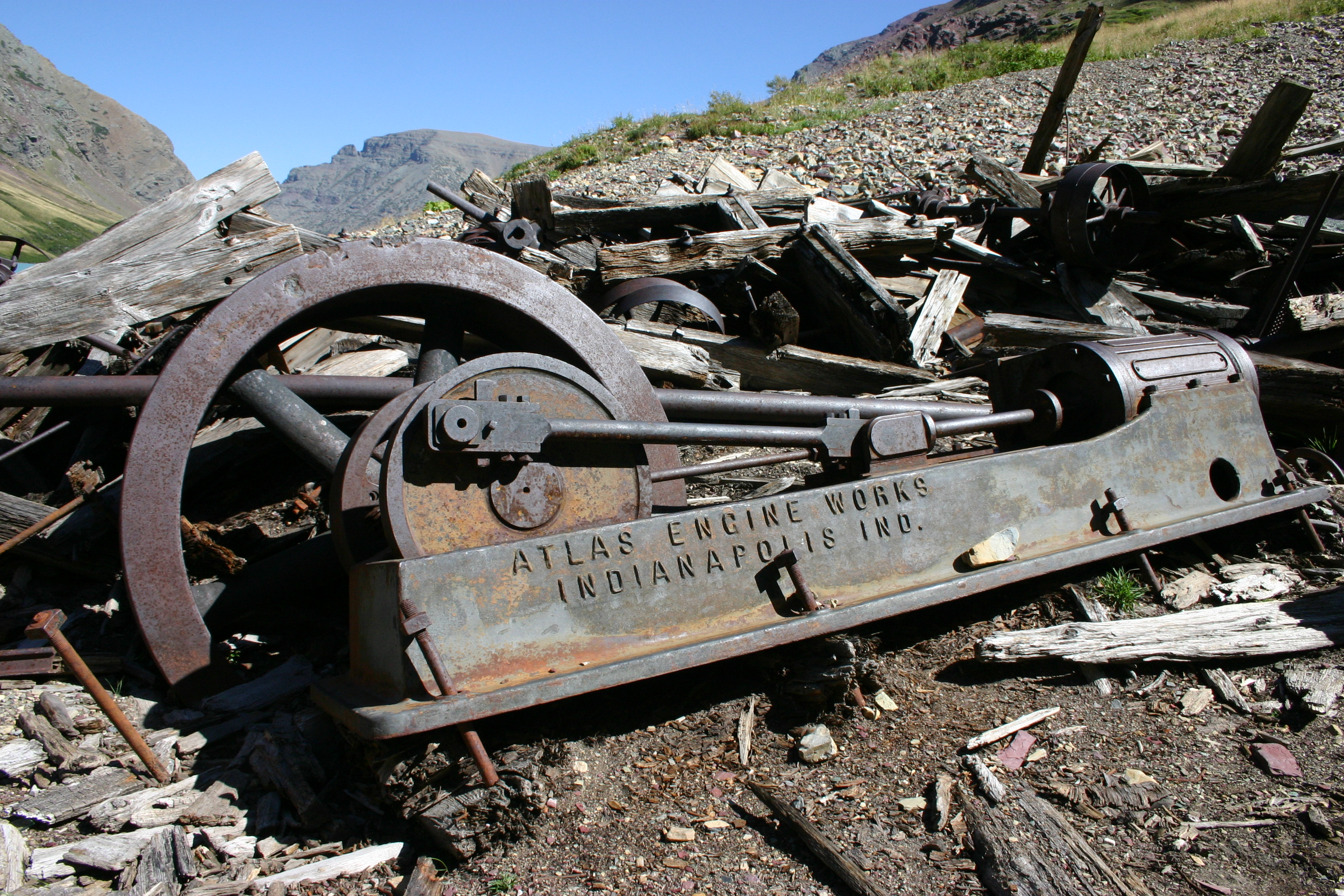
Mining equipment at the lake

== See also ==
- List of lakes in Glacier County, Montana
