= Stoney Indian Peaks =

Mountain in the state of Montana

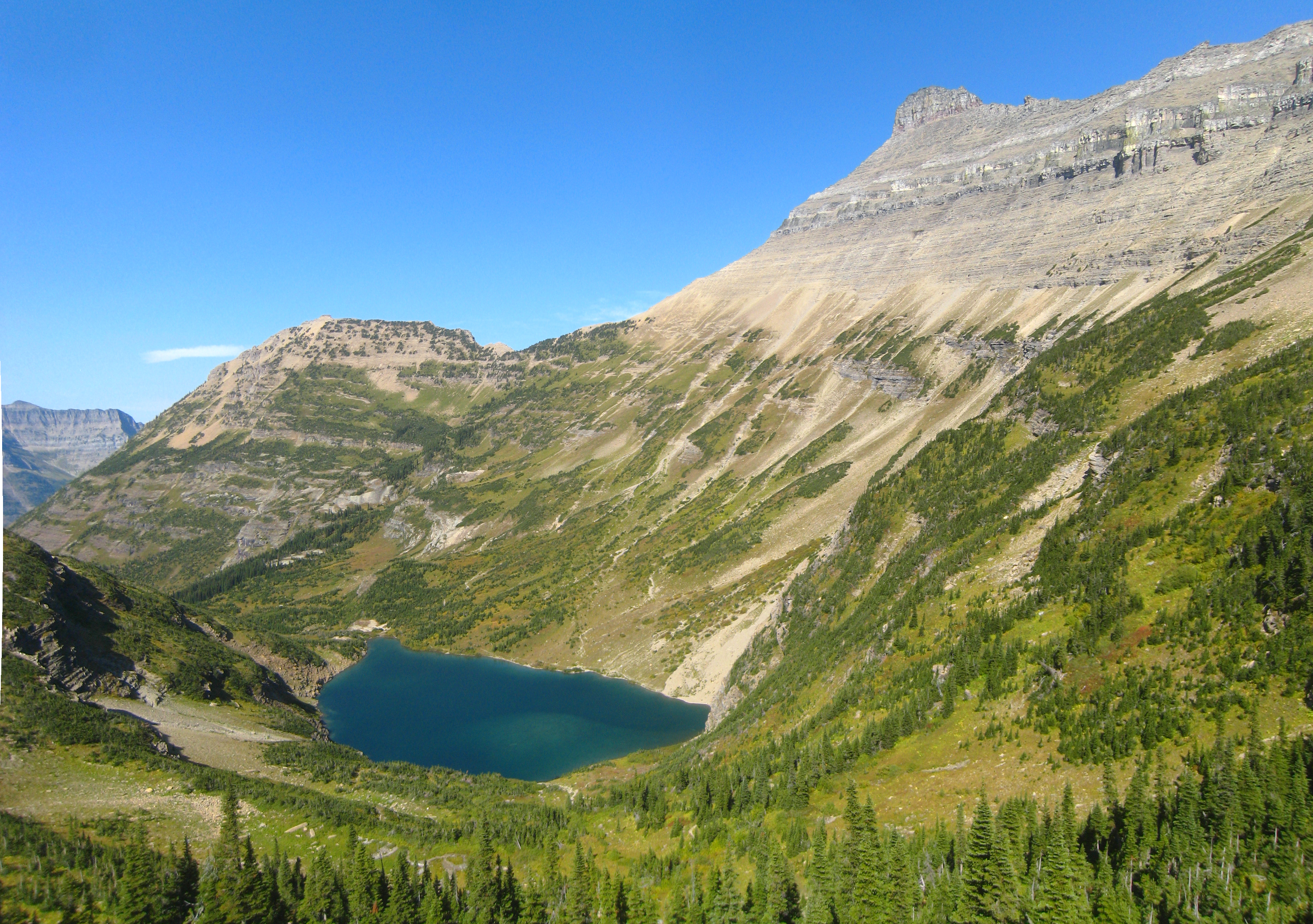
- Stoney Indian Peaks at right above Stoney Indian Lake

Highest point
- Elevation: 9,355 ft (2,851 m)
- Prominence: 830 ft (250 m)
- Coordinates: 48°53′55″N 113°51′30″W

Geography
- Location within Montana Location within the United States
- Location: Glacier County, Montana, U.S.
- Parent range: Lewis Range
- Topo map(s): USGS Mount Cleveland, MT

Stoney Indian Peaks (9,355 feet (2,851 m)) are located in the Lewis Range, Glacier National Park in the U.S. state of Montana. Consisting of several summits, the mountain is in the northeastern region of Glacier National Park, less than 2 miles (3.2 km) south of Mount Cleveland. Stoney Indian Lake is south of the peaks.

== See also ==
- Mountains and mountain ranges of Glacier National Park (U.S.)
