= Goat Haunt Mountain =

Mountain in the state of Montana

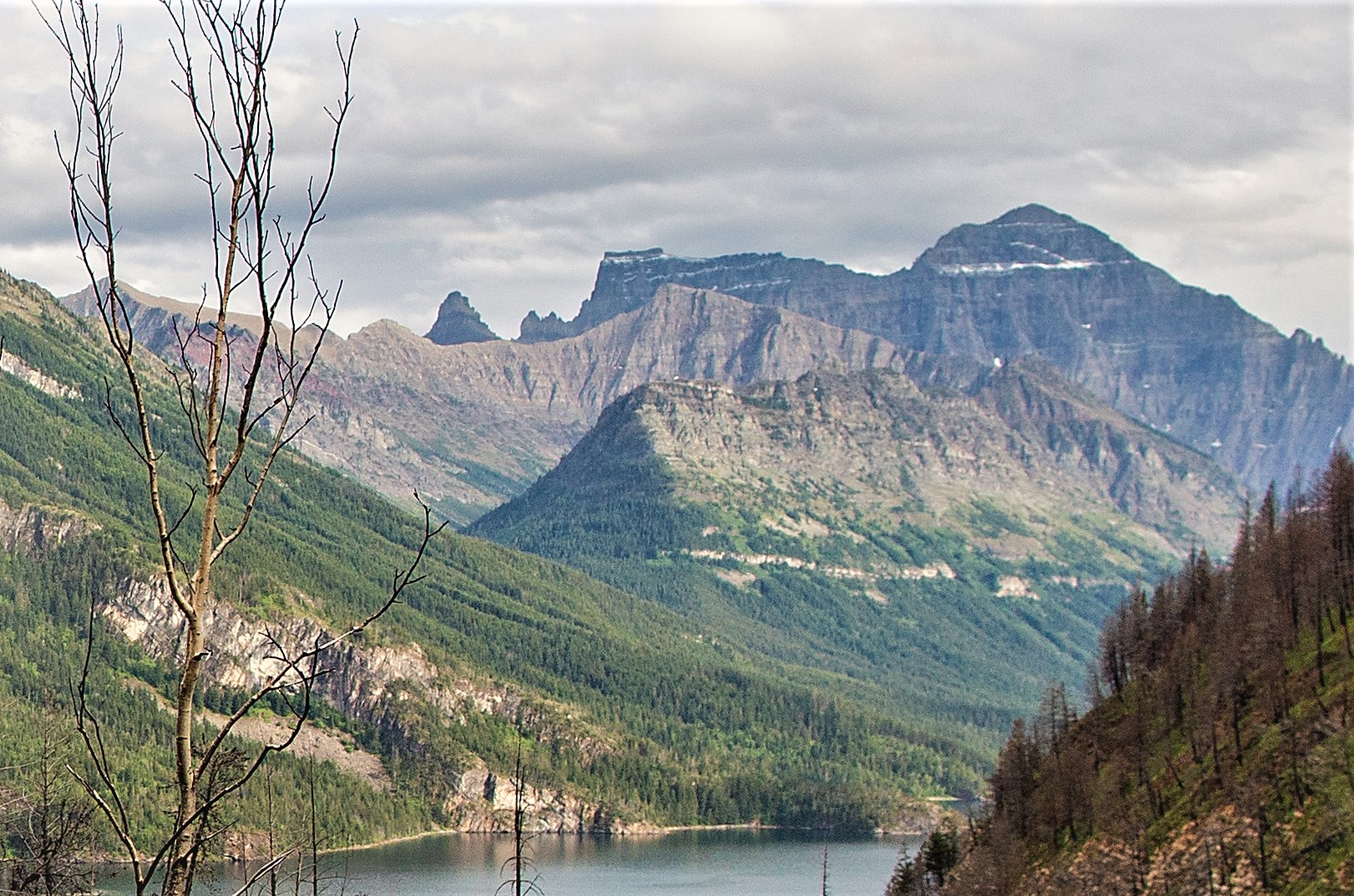
- Goat Haunt Mountain centered above a ridge but in front of larger Mount Cleveland. Camera pointed SSE.

Highest point
- Elevation: 8,646 ft (2,635 m) NAVD 88
- Prominence: 721 ft (220 m)
- Coordinates: 48°57′03″N 113°50′56″W

Geography
- Location within Montana Location within the United States
- Location: Glacier County, Montana, U.S.
- Parent range: Lewis Range
- Topo map(s): USGS Mount Cleveland, MT

Climbing
- First ascent: Unknown
- Easiest route: Scramble

Goat Haunt Mountain (8,646 feet (2,635 m)) is located in the Lewis Range, Glacier National Park in the U.S. state of Montana. Goat Haunt Mountain is in the northeastern section of Glacier National Park, approximately 1.85 miles (2.98 km) north of Mount Cleveland. The stagnant Miche Wabun Glacier is located on the eastern slopes of the mountain. The total altitude gain from the trailhead to the mountain summit is more than 4,400 ft (1,300 m). Goat Haunt Lake is northwest of the peak.

== See also ==
- Mountains and mountain ranges of Glacier National Park (U.S.)
