= Wynn Mountain =

Mountain in Montana, United States

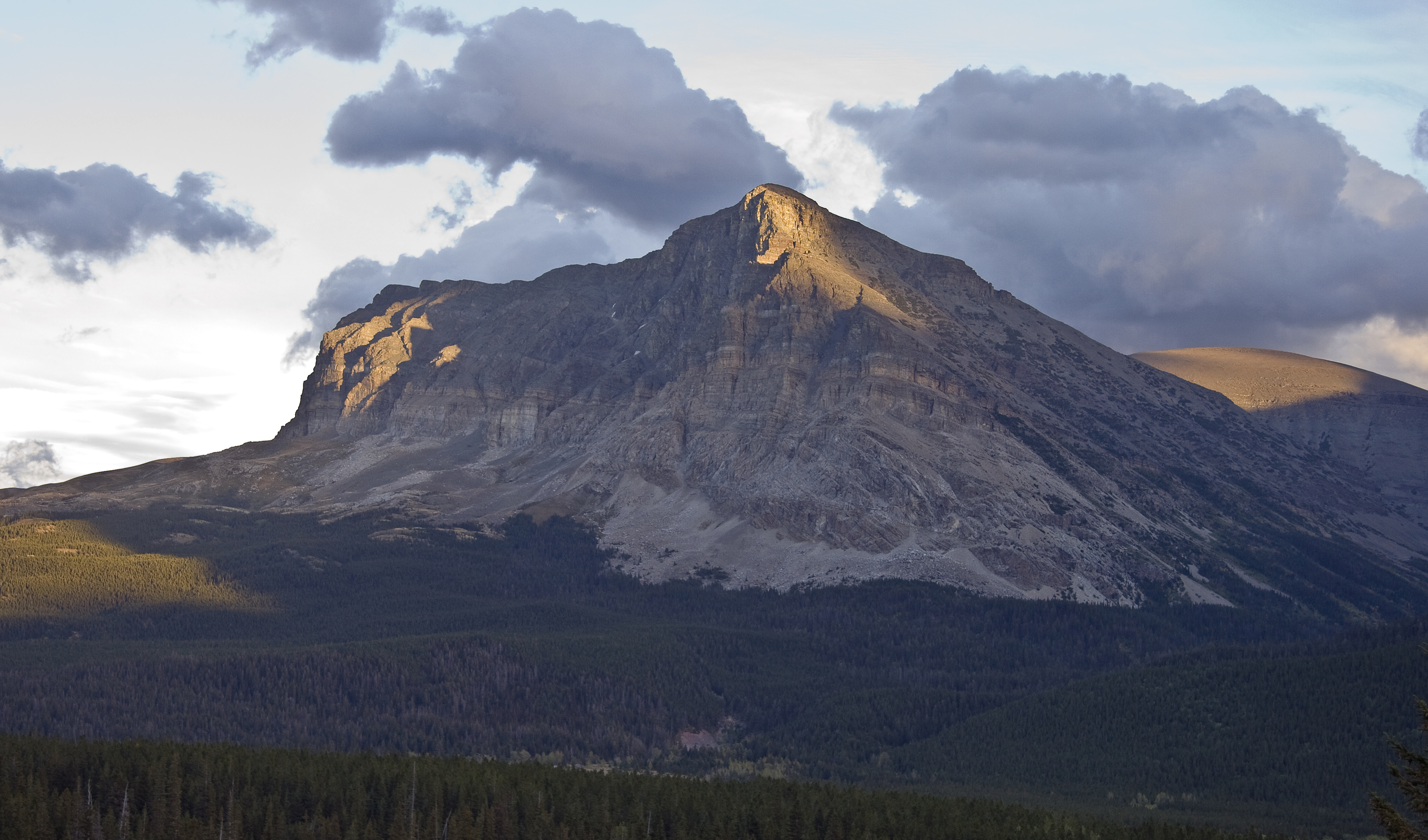
- Wynn Mountain

Highest point
- Elevation: 8,409 ft (2,563 m)
- Prominence: 364 ft (111 m)
- Coordinates: 48°46′33″N 113°35′55″W

Naming
- Etymology: Frank B. Wynn

Geography
- Location within Montana Location within the United States
- Location: Glacier County, Montana, U.S.
- Parent range: Lewis Range
- Topo map(s): USGS Lake Sherburne, MT

Wynn Mountain (8,409 feet (2,563 m)) is located in the Lewis Range of Glacier National Park, in the U.S. state of Montana. Wynn Mountain rises above the south shores of Lake Sherburne. The mountain is named for Frank B. Wynn, physician and scientist who was killed while attempting to climb nearby Mount Siyeh on July 27, 1927.

== Geology ==
Like other mountains in Glacier National Park, the peak is composed of sedimentary rock laid down during the Precambrian to Jurassic periods. Formed in shallow seas, this sedimentary rock was initially uplifted beginning 170 million years ago when the Lewis Overthrust fault pushed an enormous slab of precambrian rocks 3 mi (4.8 km) thick, 50 miles (80 km) wide and 160 miles (260 km) long over younger rock of the cretaceous period.

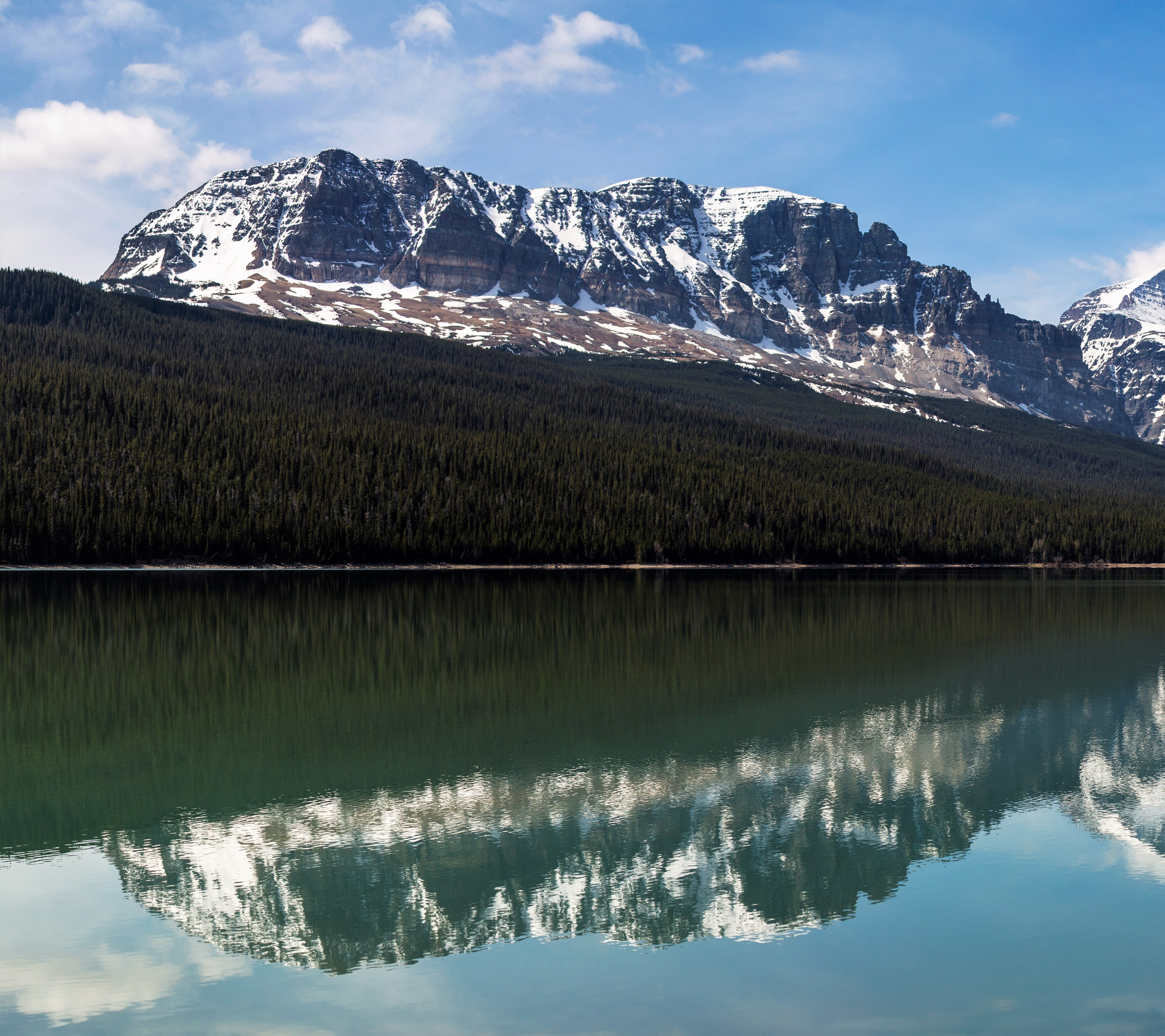
North aspect reflected in Lake Sherburne

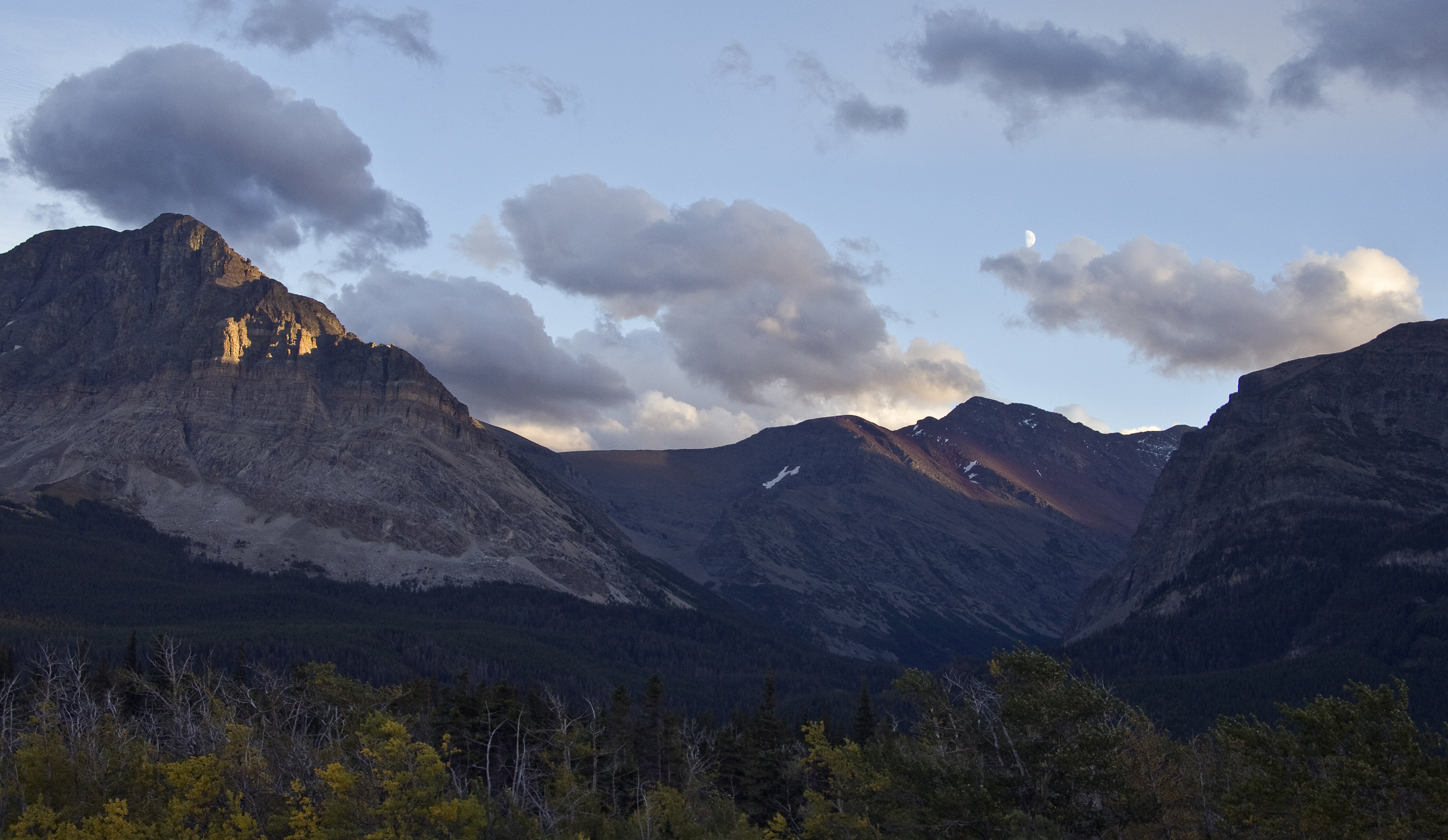
Wynn Mountain to the left of Cracker Canyon

== Climate ==
Based on the Köppen climate classification, the peak is located in an alpine subarctic climate zone with long, cold, snowy winters, and cool to warm summers. Temperatures can drop below −10 °F with wind chill factors below −30 °F.

== See also ==
- Mountains and mountain ranges of Glacier National Park (U.S.)
