= Frank B. Wynn =

American psychiatrist and conservationist (1859–1922)

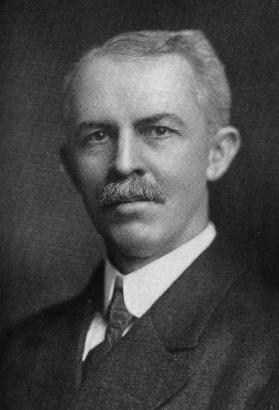
- Born: Francis Barbour Wynn; May 28, 1859; Brookville, Indiana
- Died: July 27, 1922 (aged 63); Indianapolis, Indiana
- Occupation: Psychiatrist
- Known for: The Ten Commandments of Medical Ethics, published in 1921

Signature
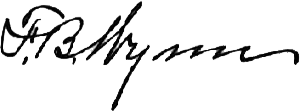

Frank Barbour Wynn (May 28, 1859 – July 27, 1922) was an American psychiatrist and early environmental conservationist.

== Early life and family ==
His father, James M. Wynn was born in 1832 and his mother, Margaret, was born in 1835. This family was listed in the 1860 US census as the most prosperous farmers on the page. His mother, Margaret, was the youngest of the five brothers and five sisters in her family. His grandparents were John and Rachel Wynn, both born in 1789.

== Education ==
Wynn graduated from DePauw University in 1883. Two years later he graduated in medicine from the Medical College of Ohio in Cincinnati, following which he served one year as intern in the Good Samaritan Hospital in Cincinnati, a position he obtained after a competitive examination. In 1886, he was granted the degree of Master of Arts, also from DePauw University.

== Professional life ==
After spending a few years studying and mountain climbing in Europe, Wynn returned to Indianapolis to set up his professional practice, giving emphasis to internal medicine, diagnosis, and pathology. Dr. David Walters further stated that, "Since that time his activities were so varied and of such value that no history of Indiana, covering the period from 1900 to the date of his death, can be fully and truthfully written without frequent mention of them." Wynn was selected as the first city sanitarian of Indianapolis and became identified with the Department of Pathology of the Medical College of Indiana. From 1895 until his death, for 27 years, he held the Chair of Medical Diagnosis in the Indiana School of Medicine. Wynn served as assistant physician in the Ohio Asylum for the Insane, at Dayton, Ohio from 1886 to 1888. At the Ohio Asylum, Wynn came under the tutelage of Dr. Josiah Rogers and Dr. Sam Smith, distinguished neuropsychiatrists who would later head the American Psychiatric Association. Smith also later became the first chancellor of the Indiana University School of Medicine.

Wynn began his association with Dr. Henry H. Goddard while at the Ohio Asylum. Goddard was a specialist in mental conditions and is credited with coining the term "moron" to describe a level of feeble-mindedness, or an IQ score between 50 and 69. Dr. Goddard became world-famous for his introduction of IQ testing in America, and he had correspondence with Dr. Albert Einstein. A copy of one of the Einstein letters to Goddard is in the Archives of the History of American Psychology at the University of Akron, Ohio.

== Conservationist ==
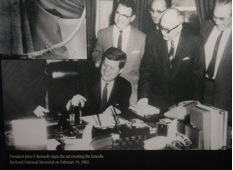
President Kennedy signs Act establishing Lincoln Boyhood National Park

Wynn was a lover of nature, a member of the Indiana Audubon Society, and president of the Indiana Nature Study Club. He was also a member of the Committee to Collect Data on the Archeology of Indiana. Wynn fought for the environmental conservation long before it was a popular notion. He spent many of his summers hiking and climbing. He led parties on many of the first ascents of several major peaks in Glacier National Park. In 1920 he was the first to climb Mount Cleveland, the highest peak in the park. President Woodrow Wilson ordered that Point Mountain be renamed Mount Wynn in recognition of Wynn's contribution to the state park system in the United States. Wynn conceived and proposed the idea of creating a state park in Indiana on site of the log cabin farm where Abraham Lincoln spent most of his boyhood years. The state park was made a national park by President John F. Kennedy in 1962.

== Mountain climbing history ==
In his Climbers Guide to Glacier National Park, J. Gordon Edwards (1995) records that Wynn led parties from the Nature Study Club of Indiana on ascents of several of the major peaks in the Park, such as Mt. Edward, Going-to-the-Sun Mountain, Mt. Gould, Chief Mountain, and Mt. Reynolds leaving thin metal boxes containing registers. Dr. David Walters (2009) found one of these boxes several hundred feet below the summit of Mount Cleveland, indicating that Wynn and his party made the first recorded summit of the highest mountain in Glacier National Park on August 12, 1920. Some time after Wynn's death on Mount Siyeh, Point Mountain was renamed Mount Wynn in his honor.

== Death ==
Wynn died while climbing Mount Siyeh in Glacier Park on July 27, 1922.
