= Allen Mountain (Montana) =

Mountain in the state of Montana

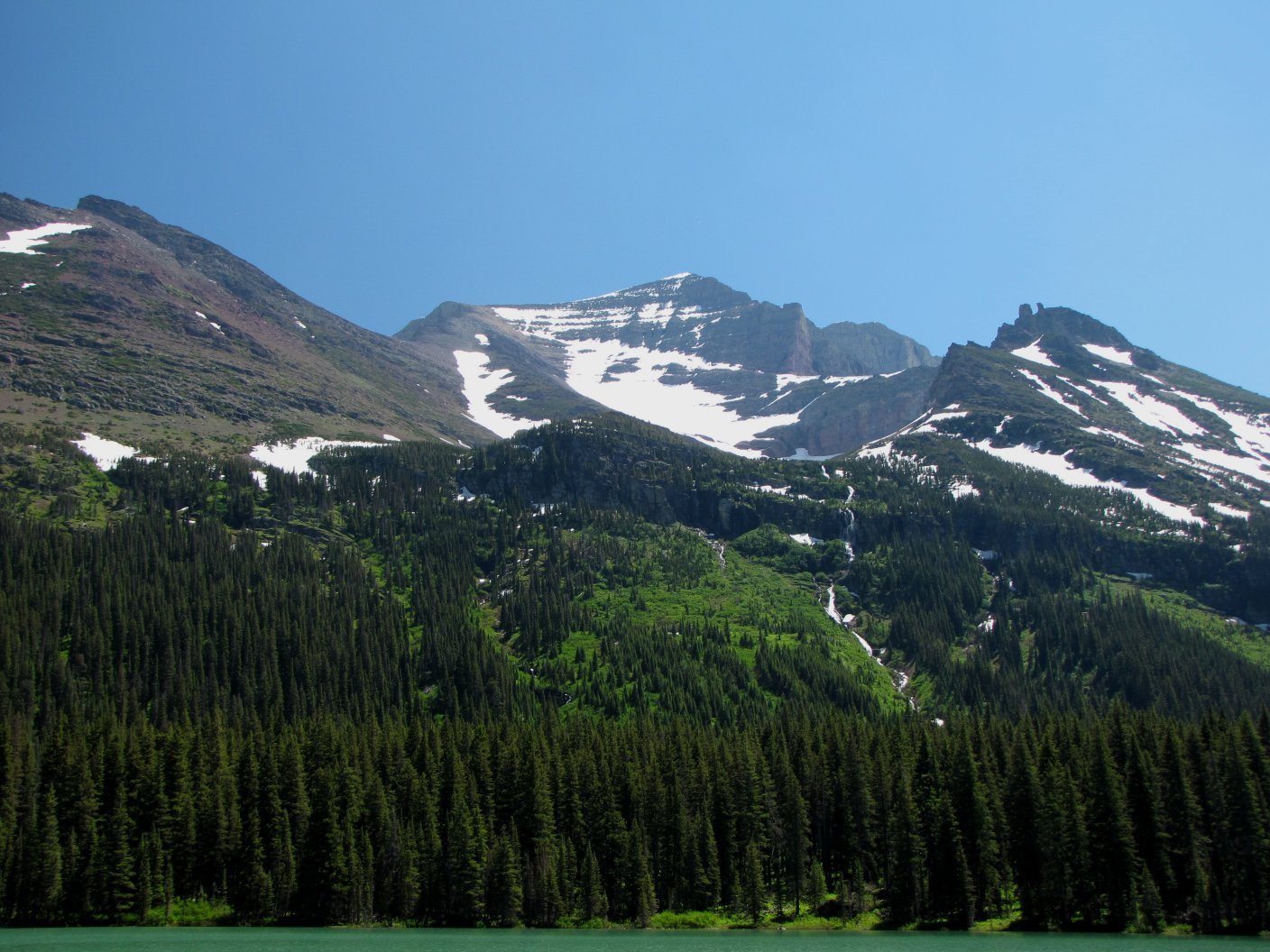
- Allen Mountain from Lake Josephine

Highest point
- Elevation: 9,381 ft (2,859 m)
- Prominence: 1,136 ft (346 m)
- Parent peak: Mount Siyeh
- Listing: Mountains in Glacier County, Montana
- Coordinates: 48°45′29″N 113°39′27″W

Geography
- Location within Montana Location within the United States
- Location: Glacier County, Montana, U.S.
- Parent range: Lewis Range
- Topo map: USGS Many Glacier MT

Allen Mountain (9,381 ft (2,859 m)) is located in the Lewis Range, Glacier National Park in the U.S. state of Montana. Allen Mountain is NNW of Cracker Lake. The mountain is named to honor Cornelia Seward Allen, the granddaughter of President Abraham Lincoln's Secretary of State William H. Seward Sr. The mountain was named in 1891 by a party of explorers headed by George Bird Grinnell that included Cornelia's brother, William Henry Seward III, a Yale University classmate of Grinnell.

== See also ==
- List of mountains and mountain ranges of Glacier National Park (U.S.)

== Gallery ==
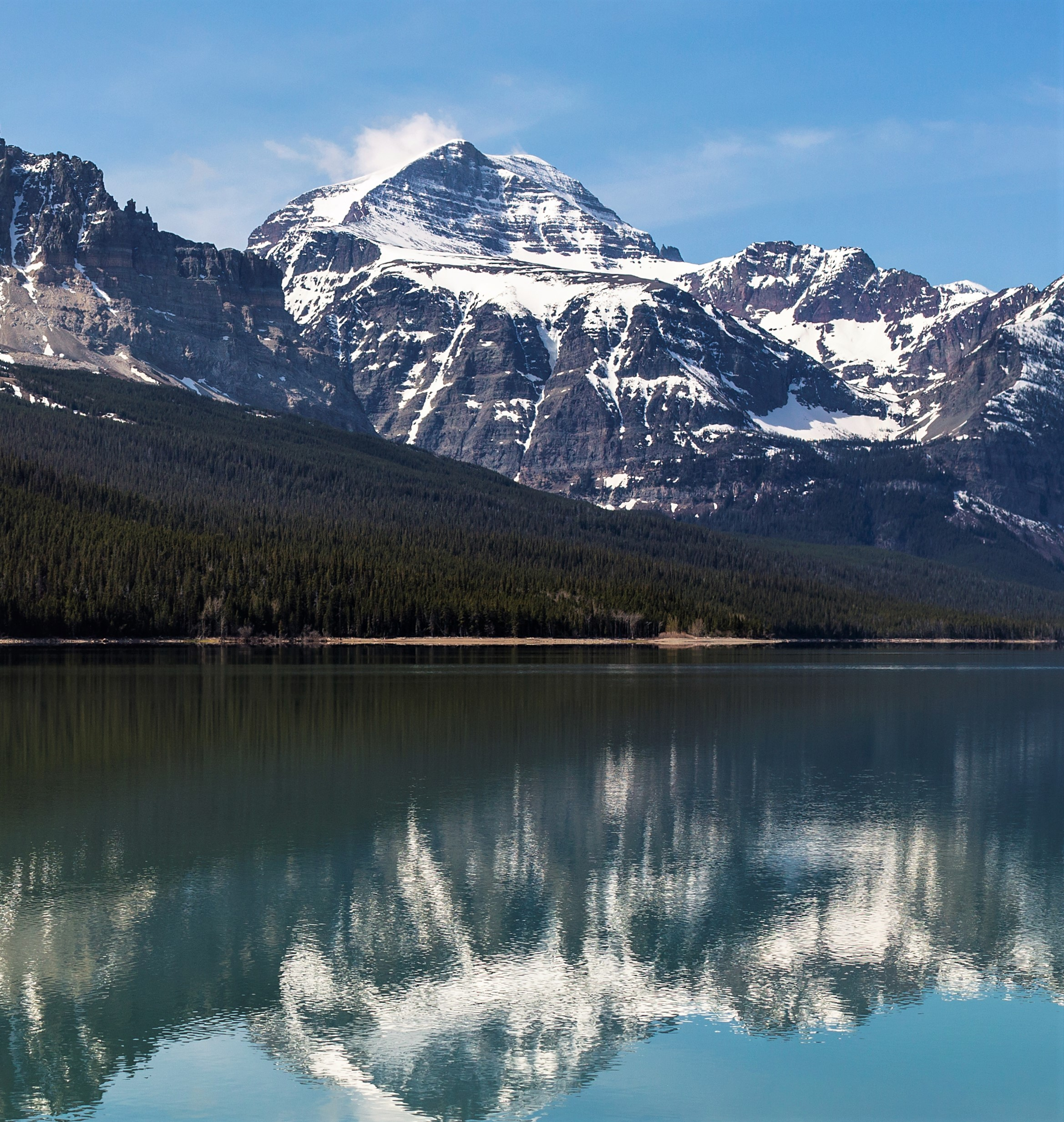
Allen Mountain's northeast aspect reflected in Lake Sherburne

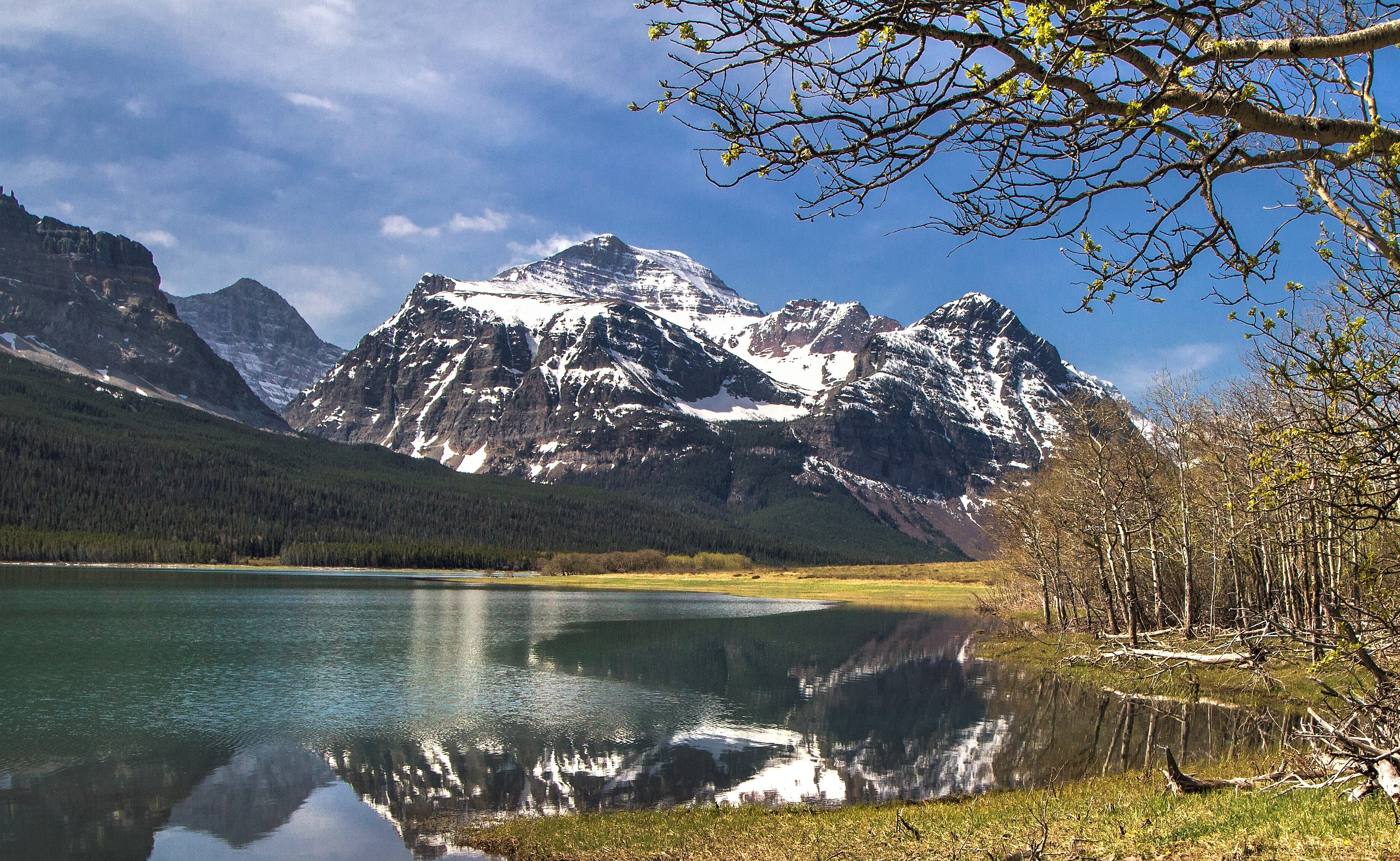
Allen in Spring

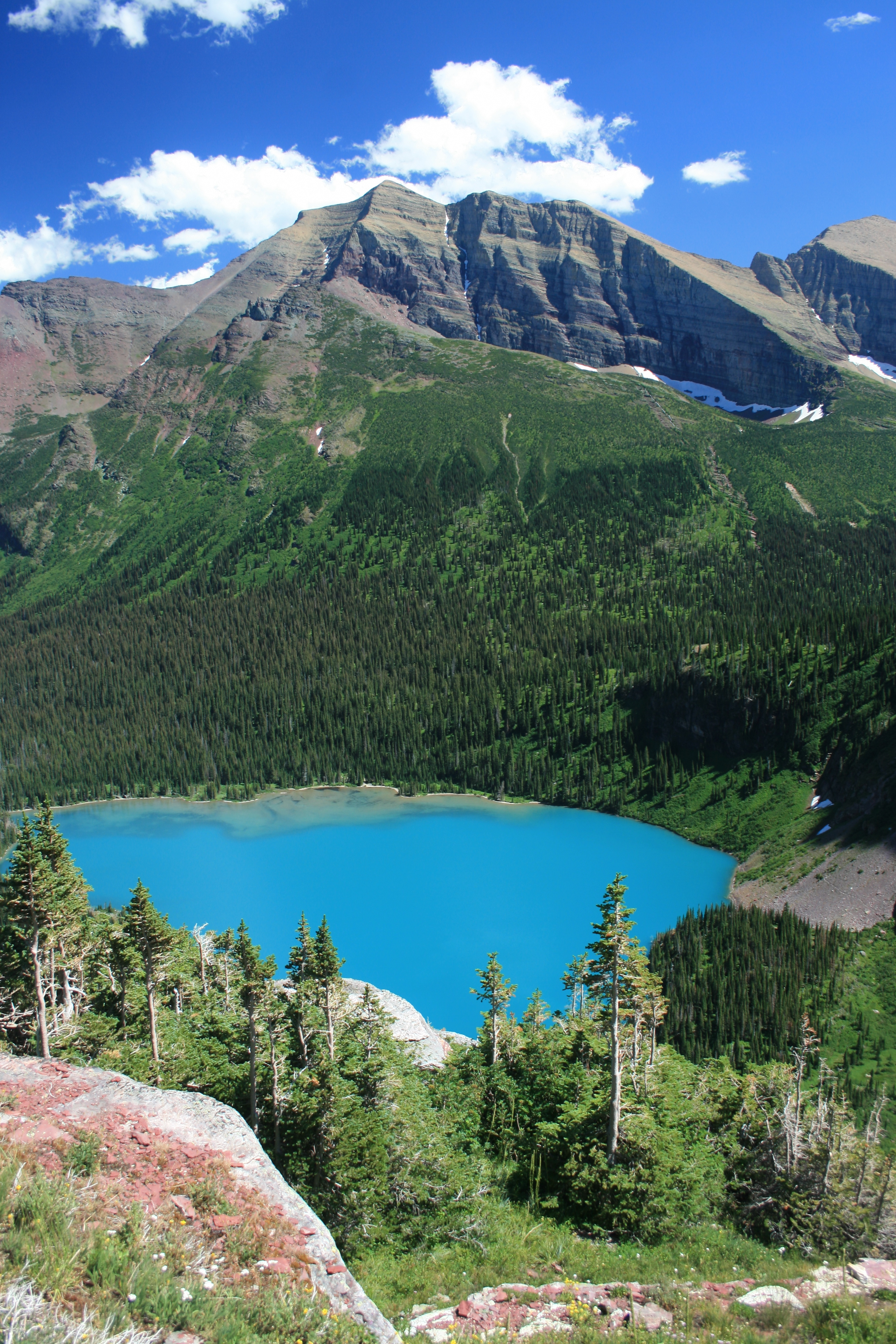
West aspect above Grinnell Lake

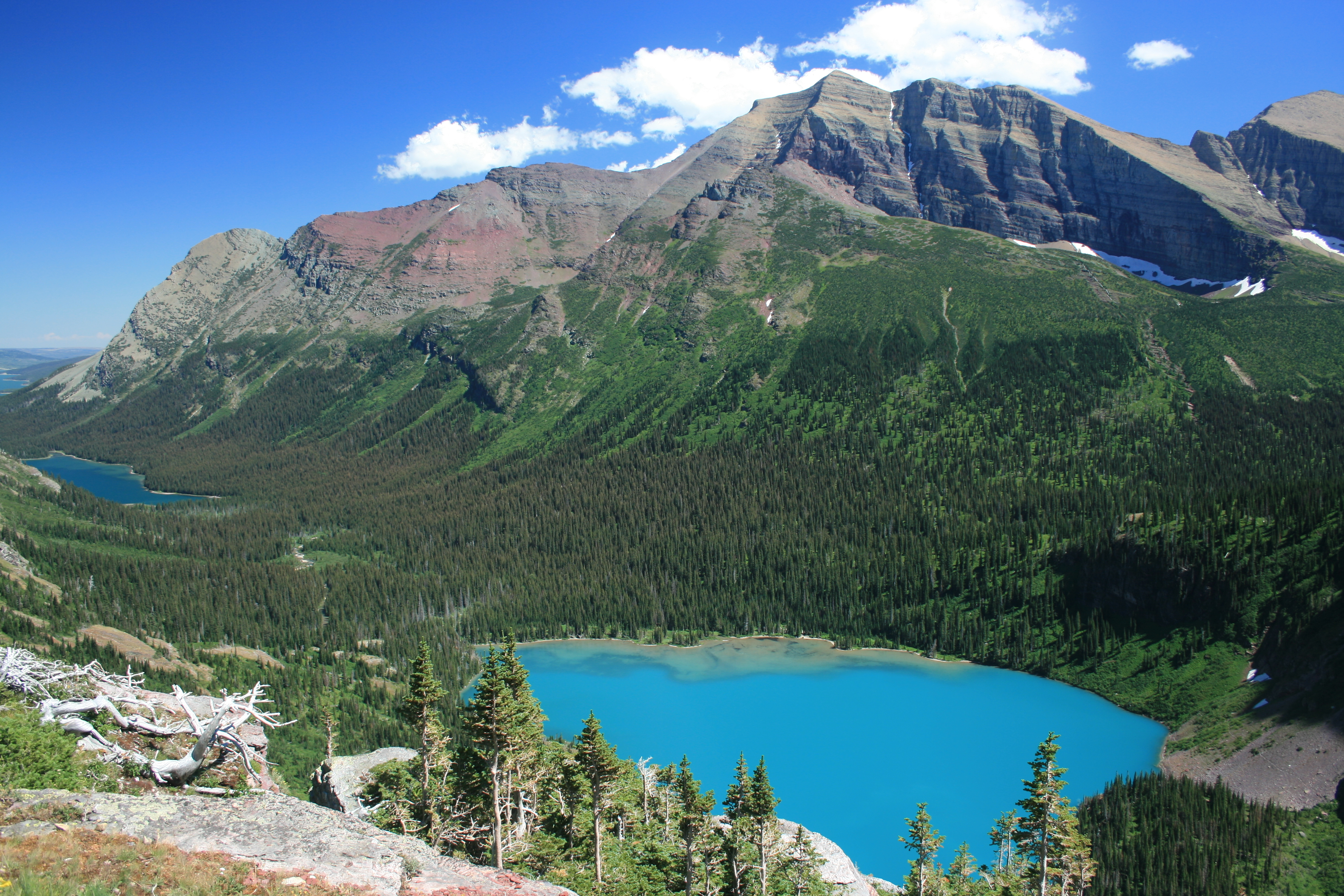
West aspect above Grinnell Lake
