= Siyeh Glacier =

Glacier in Montana, United States

- Location within Montana
- Type: Mountain glacier
- Location: Glacier National Park, Glacier County, Montana, U.S.
- Coordinates: 48°43′52″N 113°39′17″W
- Area: Estimated at 14 acres (0.057 km^{2}) in 2005
- Length: .10 mi (0.16 km)
- Terminus: Talus
- Status: Retreating

Siyeh Glacier is in Glacier National Park in the U.S. state of Montana. The glacier lies in a deep cirque to the north of Mount Siyeh at an elevation between 7,200 feet (2,200 m) and 6,800 feet (2,100 m) above sea level. Siyeh Glacier covers an area of less than 10 acres (0.040 km^{2}) and does not meet the threshold of 25 acres (0.10 km^{2}) often cited as being the minimum size to qualify as an active glacier. Siyeh Glacier has experienced massive retreat, losing over 73 percent of its surface area between 1966 and 2005.

== See also ==
- List of glaciers in the United States
- Glaciers in Glacier National Park (U.S.)
