= Stoney Indian Lake =

Lake in the state of Montana

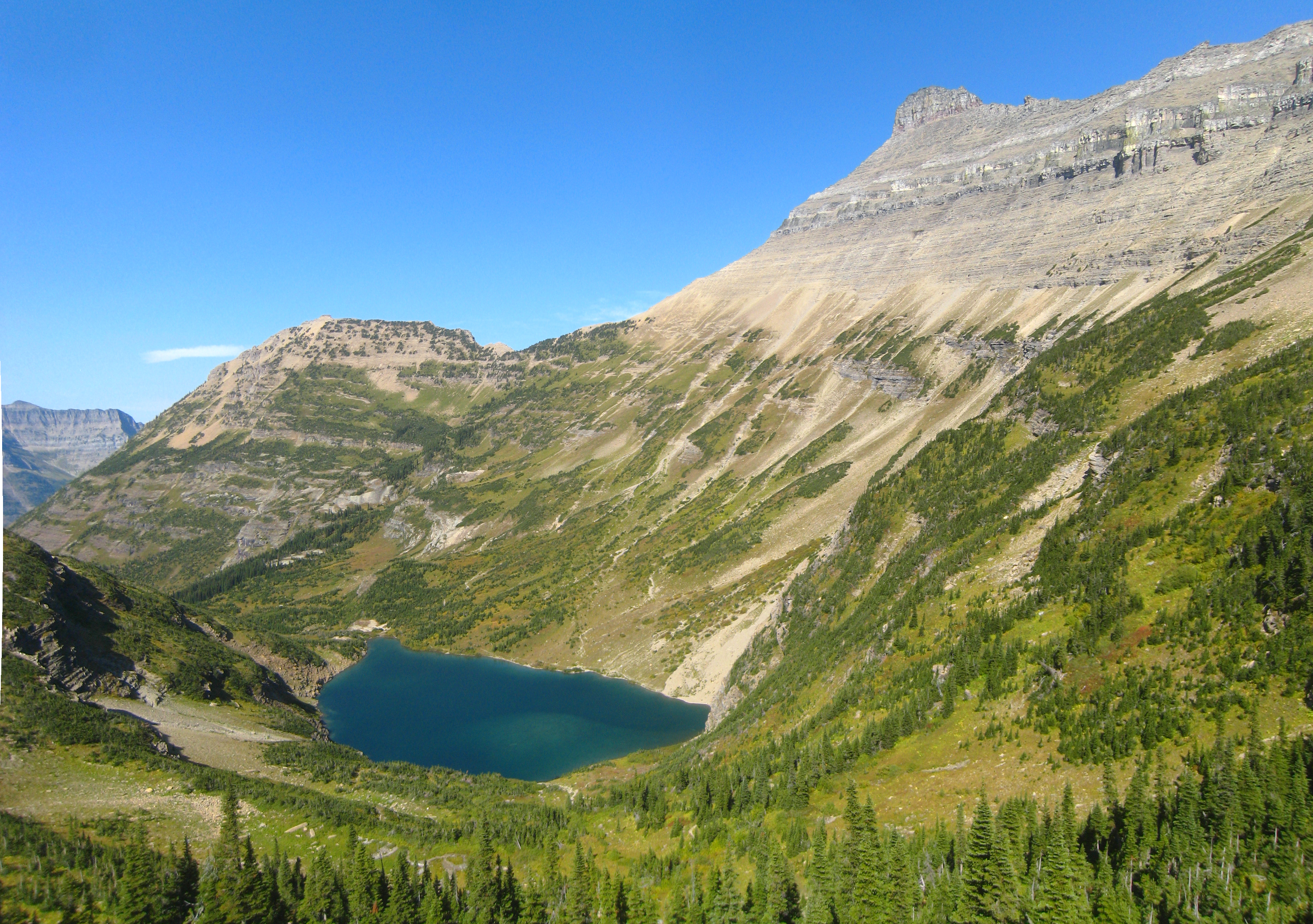
- View of Stoney Indian Lake from Stoney Indian Pass

- Location within Montana Location within the United States
- Location: Glacier National Park, Glacier County, Montana, US
- Coordinates: 48°53′10″N 113°51′58″W
- Type: Natural
- Primary outflows: Pass Creek
- Basin countries: United States
- Max. length: .20 mi (0.32 km)
- Max. width: .15 mi (0.24 km)
- Surface elevation: 6,325 ft (1,928 m)

Stoney Indian Lake is located in Glacier National Park in the U. S. state of Montana. It is northeast of Wahcheechee Mountain and south of Stoney Indian Peaks.

== See also ==
- List of lakes in Glacier County, Montana
