= Wahcheechee Mountain =

Mountain in Montana, United States

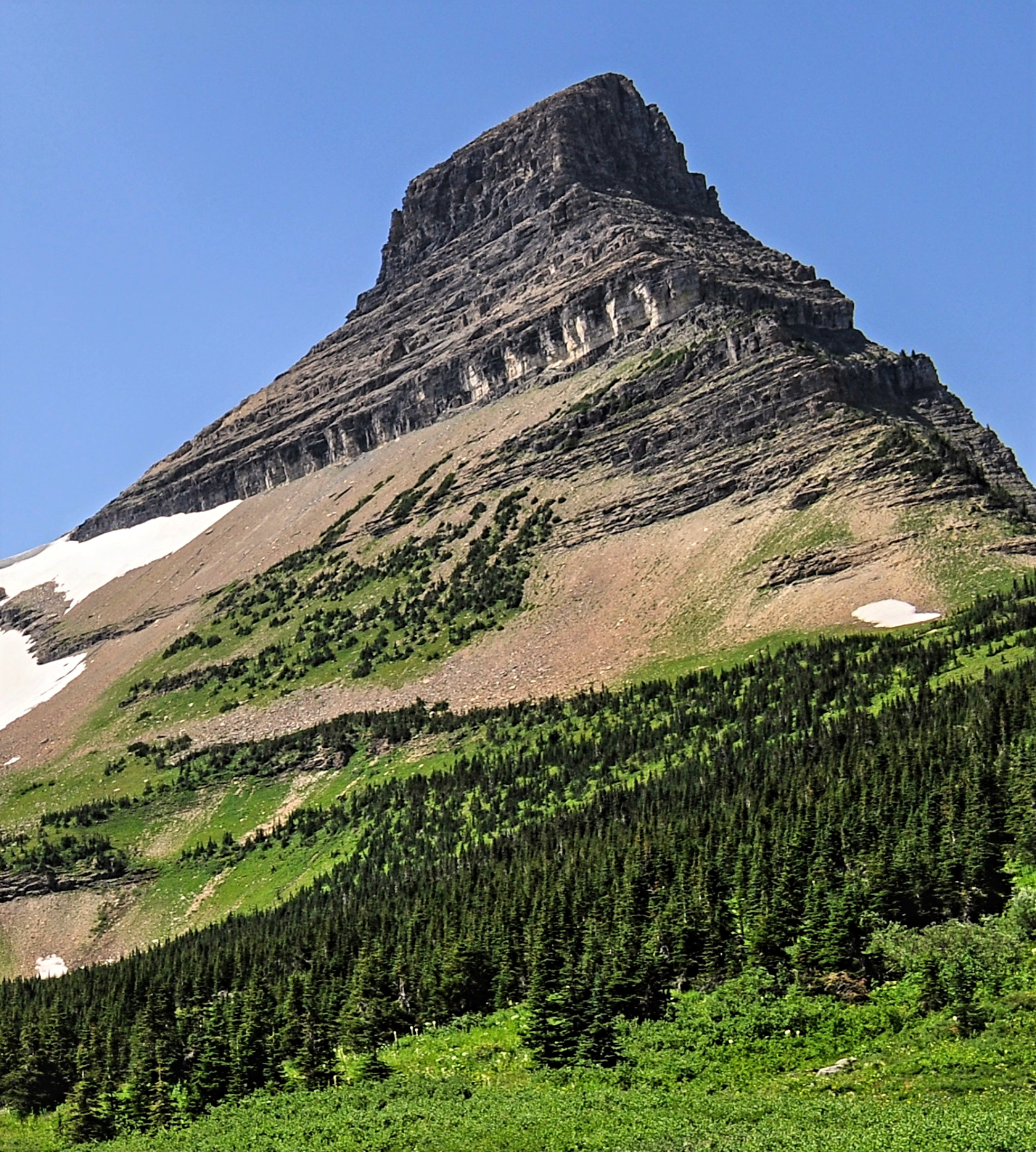

Highest point
- Elevation: 8,477 ft (2,584 m)
- Prominence: 877 ft (267 m)
- Coordinates: 48°52′59″N 113°52′28″W

Geography
- Location within Montana Location within the United States
- Location: Glacier County, Montana, U.S.
- Parent range: Lewis Range
- Topo map(s): USGS Mount Cleveland, MT

Wahcheechee Mountain (8,418 feet (2,566 m)) is located in the Lewis Range, Glacier National Park in the U.S. state of Montana. Stoney Indian Lake is just northeast of the peak.

== Climate ==
Based on the Köppen climate classification, it is located in an alpine subarctic climate zone characterized by long, usually very cold winters, and short, cool to mild summers.

Temperatures can drop below −10 °F with wind chill factors below −30 °F.

== Geology ==
Like the mountains in Glacier National Park, it is composed of sedimentary rock laid down during the Precambrian to Jurassic periods. Formed in shallow seas, this sedimentary rock was initially uplifted beginning 170 million years ago when the Lewis Overthrust fault pushed an enormous slab of precambrian rocks 3 mi (4.8 km) thick, 50 miles (80 km) wide and 160 miles (260 km) long over younger rock of the cretaceous period.

== See also ==
- Mountains and mountain ranges of Glacier National Park (U.S.)
