= Kaiser Point (Montana) =

Mountain in Montana, United States

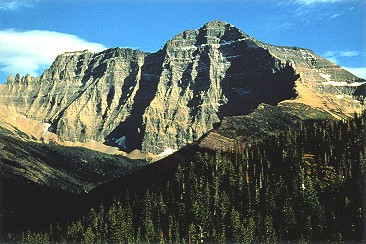
- Mount Cleveland at right and Kaiser Point is far point on ridgeline at left

Highest point
- Elevation: 10,001 ft (3,048 m)
- Prominence: 596 ft (182 m)
- Coordinates: 48°55′56″N 113°50′01″W

Geography
- Location within Montana Location within the United States
- Location: Glacier County, Montana, U.S.
- Parent range: Lewis Range
- Topo map: USGS Mount Cleveland MT

Climbing
- Easiest route: class IV-V

Kaiser Point (10,001 feet (3,048 m)) is located in the Lewis Range, Glacier National Park in the U.S. state of Montana. Maps indicate the peak is listed only by the elevation of 9,996 ft (3,047 m) according to the Sea Level Datum of 1929, however the updated elevation by the currently implemented North American Vertical Datum of 1988 indicates the peak exceeds 10,000 ft (3,048 m). The National Park Service reports that six peaks rise to over 10,000 ft (3,048 m) in Glacier National Park, but Kaiser Point is listed as the seventh tallest. Kaiser Point is only .67 miles (1.08 km) northeast of Mount Cleveland, the tallest summit in the park.

== See also ==
- Mountains and mountain ranges of Glacier National Park (U.S.)
