= Cracker (benchmark) =

Benchmark in the state of Montana

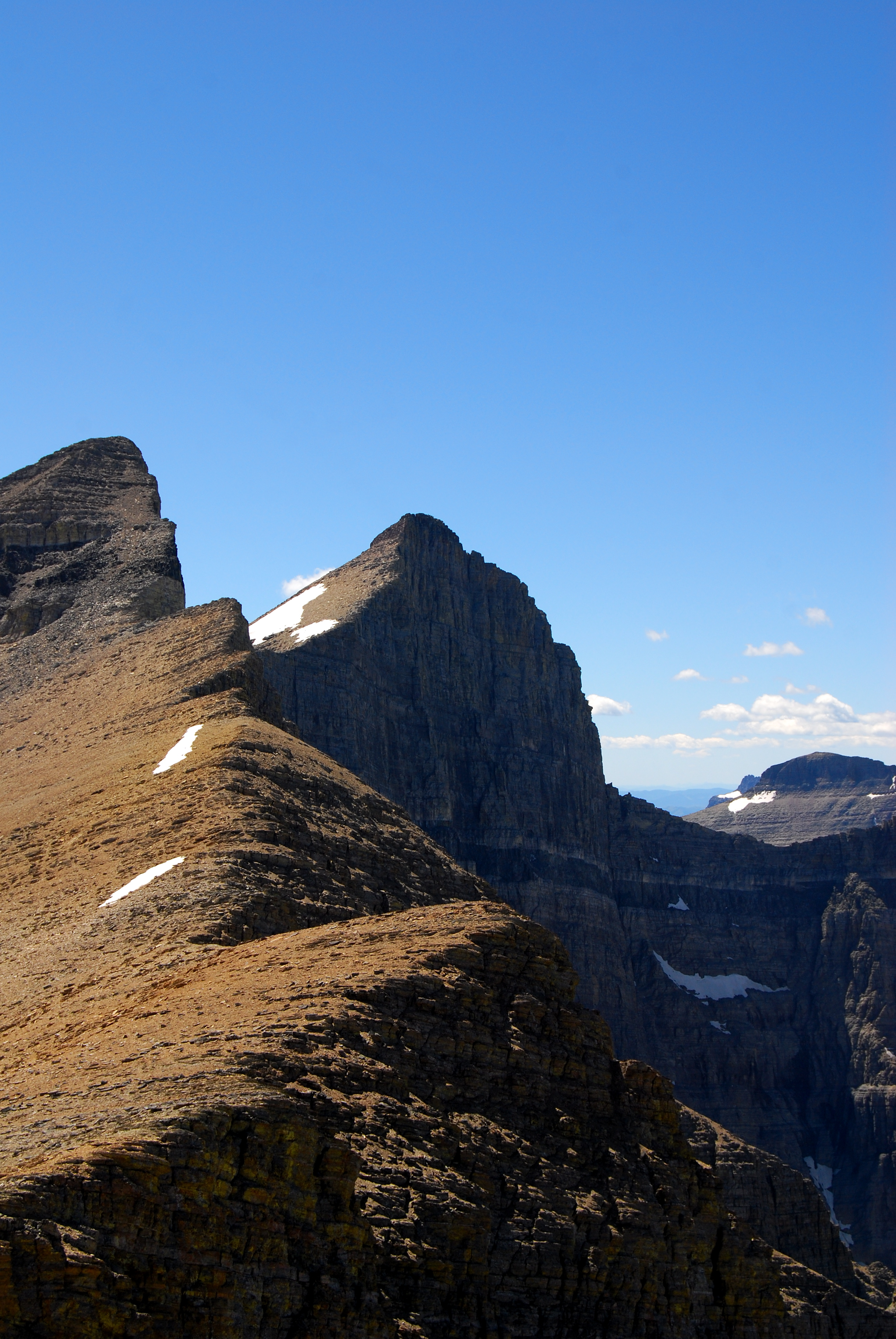
- Cracker Peak at left with Mount Siyeh in the background

Highest point
- Elevation: 9,838 ft (2,999 m)
- Prominence: 313 ft (95 m)
- Coordinates: 48°43′56″N 113°38′17″W

Geography
- Location within Montana Location within the United States
- Location: Glacier County, Montana, U.S.
- Parent range: Lewis Range
- Topo map(s): USGS Logan Pass, Montana

Cracker benchmark (9,838 feet (2,999 m)) is located in the Lewis Range, Glacier National Park in the U.S. state of Montana. Cracker is a benchmark summit located on a ridgeline 0.5 miles (1 km) northeast of Mount Siyeh.

== See also ==
- Mountains and mountain ranges of Glacier National Park (U.S.)
