= Mount Cleveland (Montana) =

Mountain in Montana, United States

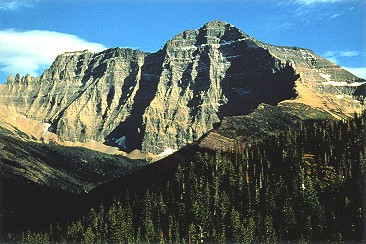
- Mount Cleveland

Highest point
- Elevation: 10,479 ft (3,194 m) NAVD 88
- Prominence: 5,252 ft (1,601 m)
- Parent peak: Mount Evans (Montana)
- Listing: US most prominent peaks 109th
- Coordinates: 48°55′30″N 113°50′54″W

Geography
- Location within Montana Location within the United States
- Location: Glacier County, Montana, U.S.
- Protected area: Glacier National Park
- Parent range: Lewis Range
- Topo map: USGS Mount Cleveland

Climbing
- First ascent: 1920 Frank B. Wynn
- Easiest route: West Face: Scramble class 3/4

Mount Cleveland is the highest mountain in Glacier National Park, located in Montana, United States. It is also the highest point in the Lewis Range, which spans part of the northern portion of the park and extends into Canada. It is located approximately 3 mi (4.8 km) southeast of the southern end of Waterton Lake, and approximately 5 mi (8.0 km) south of the US–Canada border. The east side of the future national park was purchased by the federal government from the Blackfoot Confederacy in 1895 during the second term of President Grover Cleveland. According to the United States Board on Geographic Names, the mountain is named for the former president.

While not of great absolute elevation (the mountain is more than 2,300 ft (700 m) lower than Granite Peak, the highest peak in Montana), Mount Cleveland is notable for its large, steep rise above local terrain. For example, its west flank rises over 5,500 ft (1,700 m) in less than 2 mi (3.2 km); the northwest face, the steepest on the mountain, rises 4,000 ft (1,200 m) in less than 0.4 mi (0.64 km). The other faces show almost as much vertical relief. This scale and steepness of relief is quite rare in the contiguous United States. Mount Cleveland ranks 50th on the list of peaks in the contiguous U.S. with the greatest topographic prominence. The massif upon which Mount Cleveland is situated also includes 10,001-foot (3,048 m) Kaiser Point, which is the seventh-highest peak in the park and is only .67 mi (1.08 km) to the northeast.

== Climbing ==
The first recorded ascent of Mount Cleveland was in 1920 by Frank B. Wynn. The easiest route on the peak is the West Face route, starting from the Waterton Valley; it is a Class 3 scramble with the possibility of some short exposed Class 4 sections.

Other routes include the Stoney Indian Route, from Stoney Indian Pass to the south of the peak, first descended by noted Sierra mountaineer Norman Clyde and party in 1937; various routes on the Southeast Face; and the more difficult North (or Northwest) Face, climbed partially in 1971 and completely in 1976.

Although the peak has a relatively low fatality record, five Montana climbers were killed on the peak's west face in December 1969. The climbers were swept away by an avalanche and were not found for seven months.

== Climate ==
Based on the Köppen climate classification, it is located in an alpine subarctic climate zone with long, cold, snowy winters, and cool to warm summers. Temperatures can drop below −10 °F (−23 °C) with wind chill factors below −30 °F (−34 °C).

Climate data for Mount Cleveland 48.9174 N, 113.8491 W, Elevation: 9,534 ft (2,906 m) (1991–2020 normals)
Month	Jan	Feb	Mar	Apr	May	Jun	Jul	Aug	Sep	Oct	Nov	Dec	Year
Mean daily maximum °F (°C)	21.5 (−5.8)	21.0 (−6.1)	24.7 (−4.1)	29.7 (−1.3)	39.1 (3.9)	47.1 (8.4)	58.0 (14.4)	58.6 (14.8)	50.3 (10.2)	37.1 (2.8)	25.2 (−3.8)	20.2 (−6.6)	36.0 (2.2)
Daily mean °F (°C)	14.8 (−9.6)	13.0 (−10.6)	15.7 (−9.1)	20.1 (−6.6)	28.7 (−1.8)	35.9 (2.2)	45.3 (7.4)	45.6 (7.6)	38.0 (3.3)	27.5 (−2.5)	18.8 (−7.3)	13.9 (−10.1)	26.4 (−3.1)
Mean daily minimum °F (°C)	8.1 (−13.3)	5.1 (−14.9)	6.6 (−14.1)	10.4 (−12.0)	18.3 (−7.6)	24.8 (−4.0)	32.6 (0.3)	32.6 (0.3)	25.6 (−3.6)	17.9 (−7.8)	12.3 (−10.9)	7.7 (−13.5)	16.8 (−8.4)
Average precipitation inches (mm)	8.94 (227)	7.09 (180)	7.57 (192)	5.81 (148)	5.52 (140)	8.34 (212)	2.30 (58)	2.65 (67)	3.95 (100)	6.02 (153)	8.69 (221)	8.29 (211)	75.17 (1,909)
Source: PRISM Climate Group

== Geology ==
Like other mountains in Glacier National Park, it is composed of sedimentary rock laid down during the Precambrian to Jurassic periods. Formed in shallow seas, this sedimentary rock was initially uplifted beginning 170 million years ago when the Lewis Overthrust fault pushed an enormous slab of precambrian rocks 3 mi (4.8 km) thick, 50 miles (80 km) wide and 160 miles (260 km) long over younger rock of the cretaceous period. The bulk of the peak is composed of limestone of the Siyeh Formation, and the conspicuous dark band on the north face is a diorite sill.

== Gallery ==
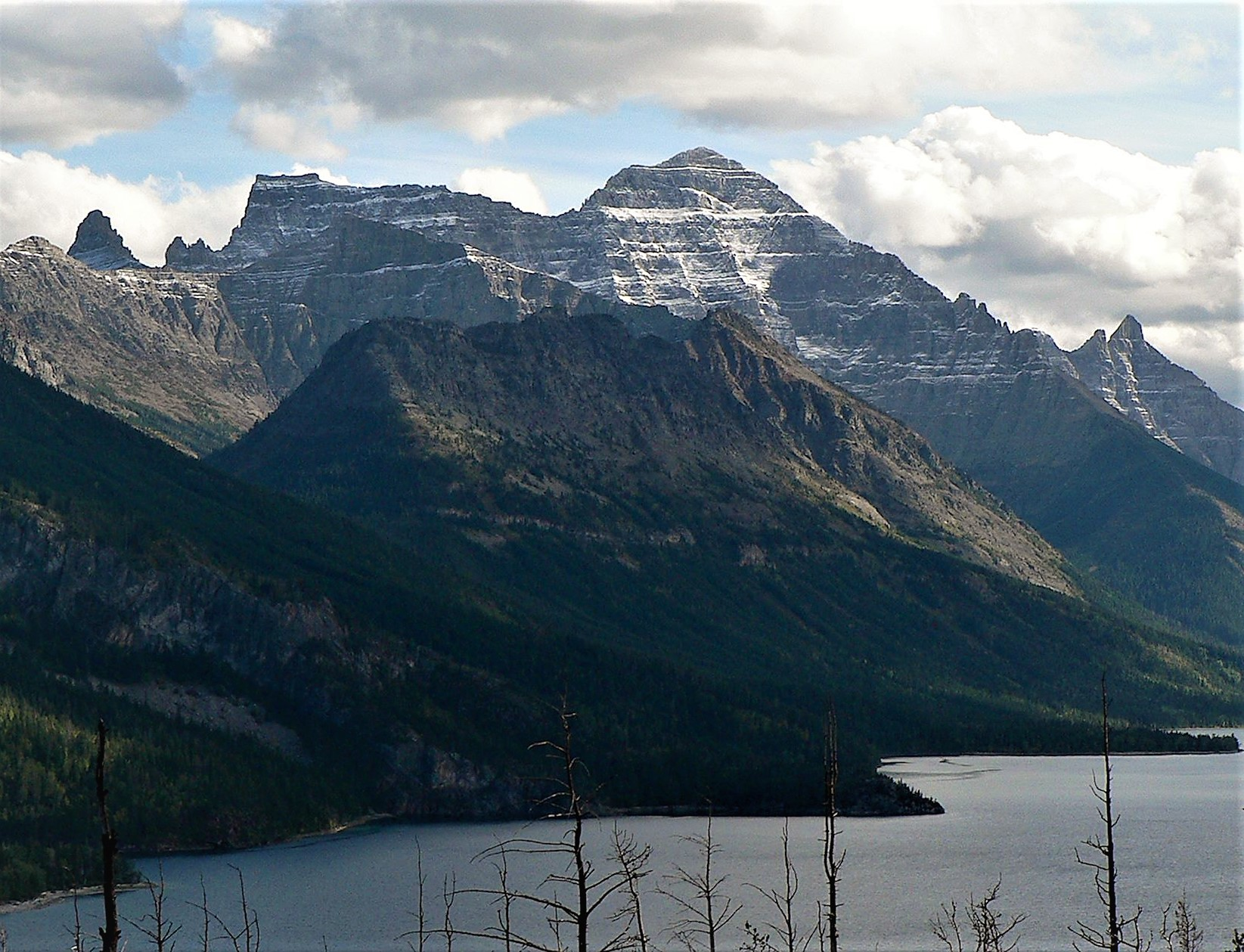

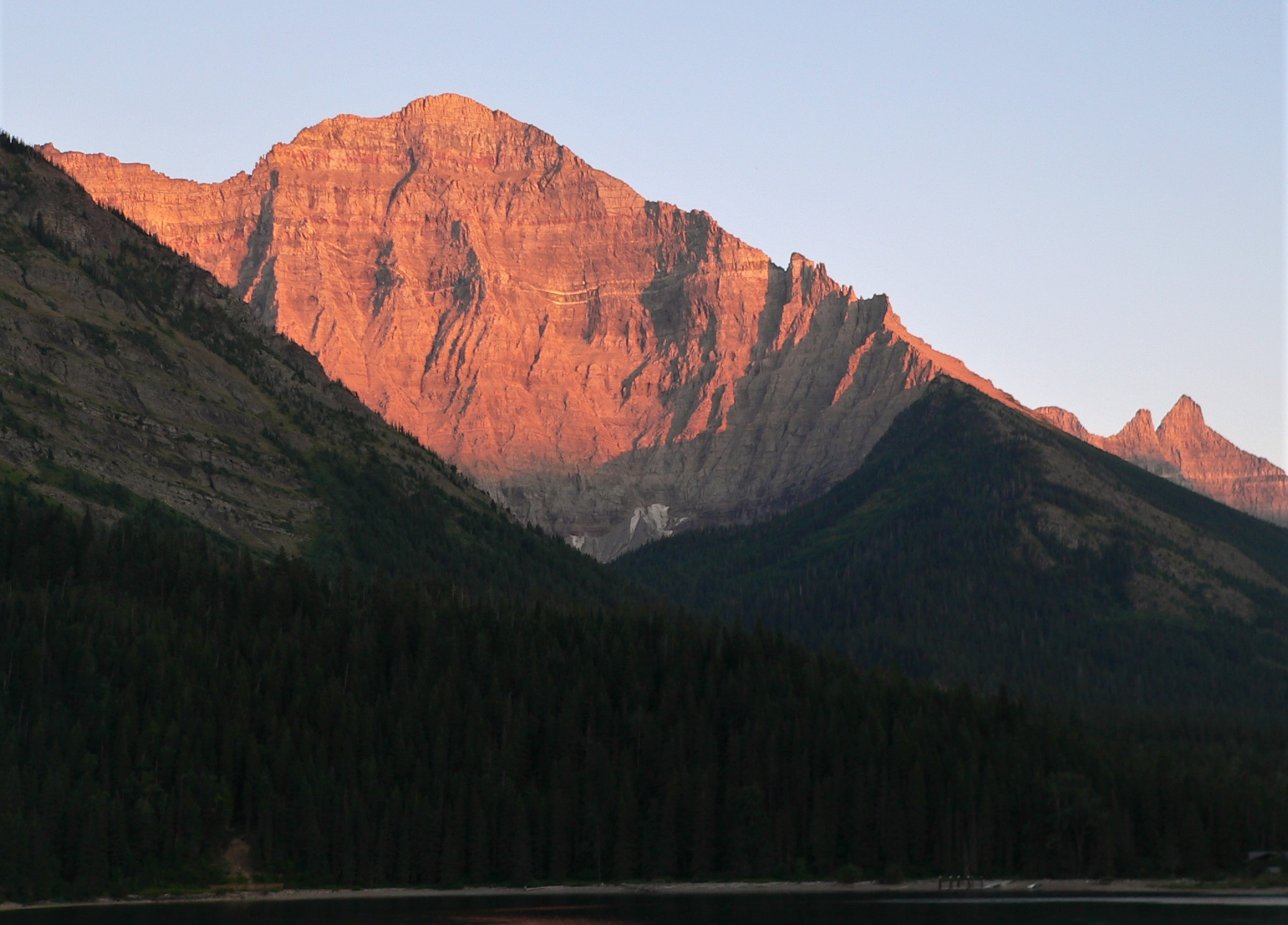
North aspect at sunset, from Waterton Lake

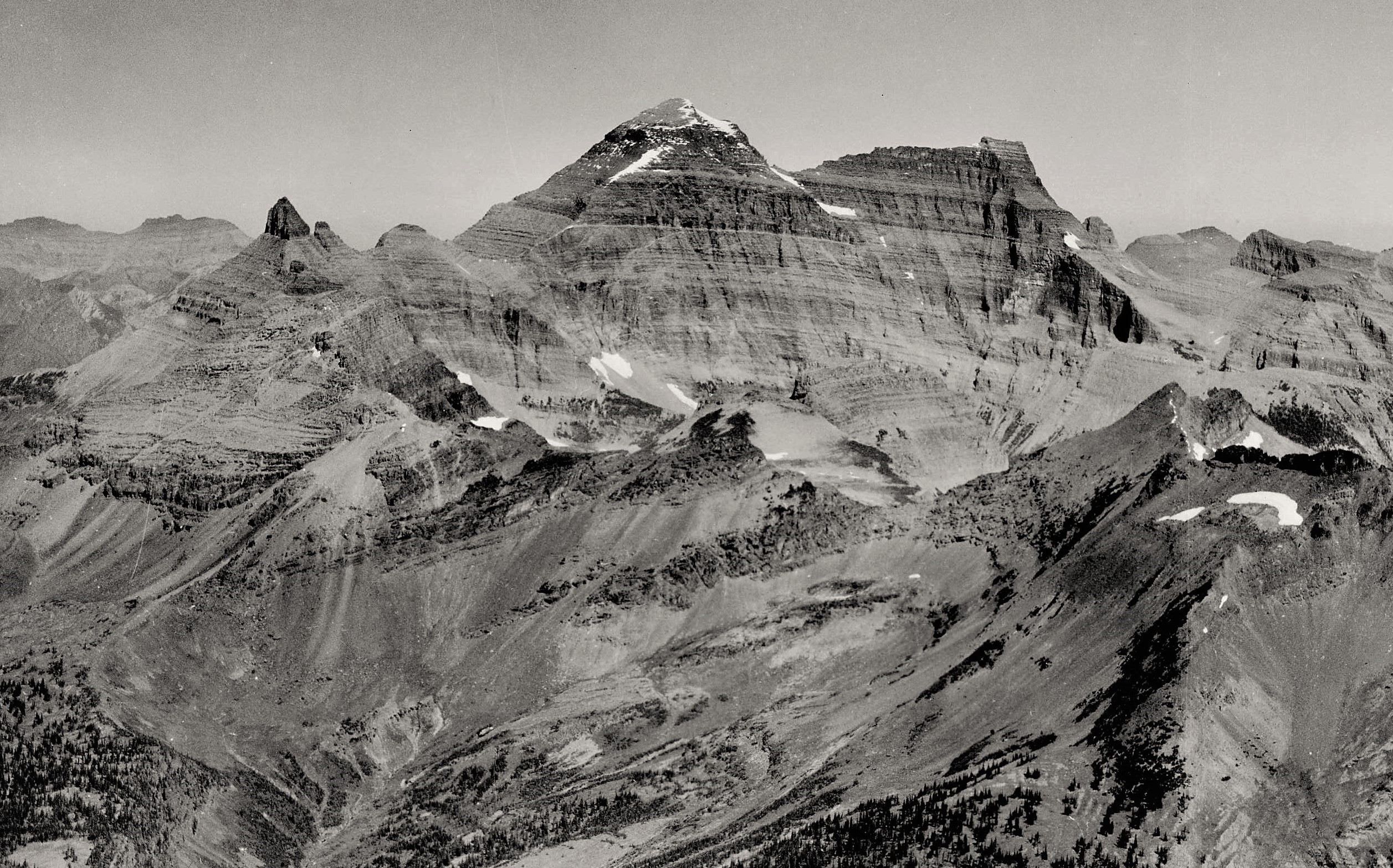
Aerial view from the south, circa 1925.

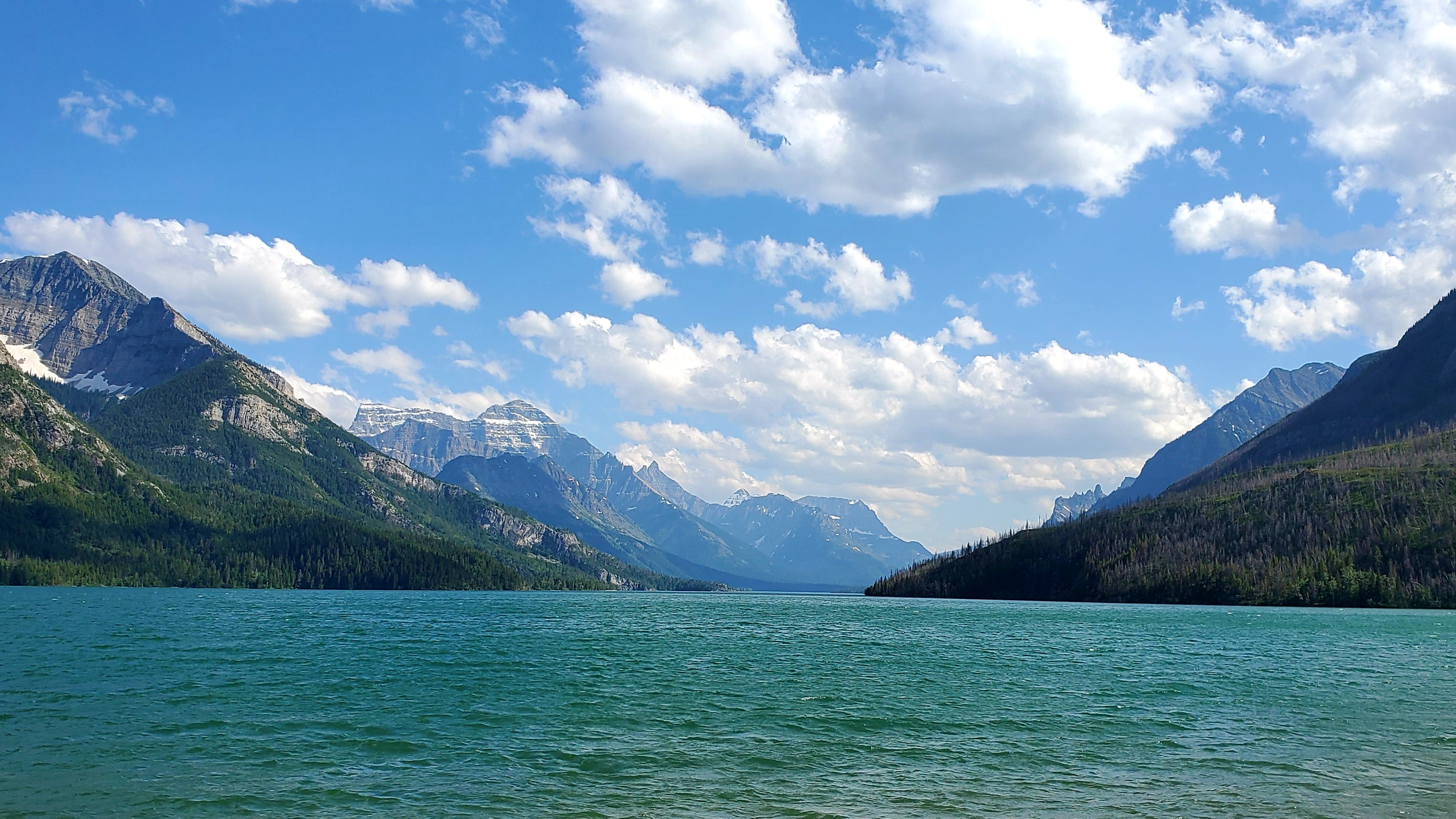
Mount Cleveland, left of center

== See also ==
- List of mountain peaks of North America
  - List of mountain peaks of the United States
    - List of Ultras of the United States
- List of mountains and mountain ranges of Glacier National Park (U.S.)
