= Mount Siyeh =

Mountain in Montana, United States

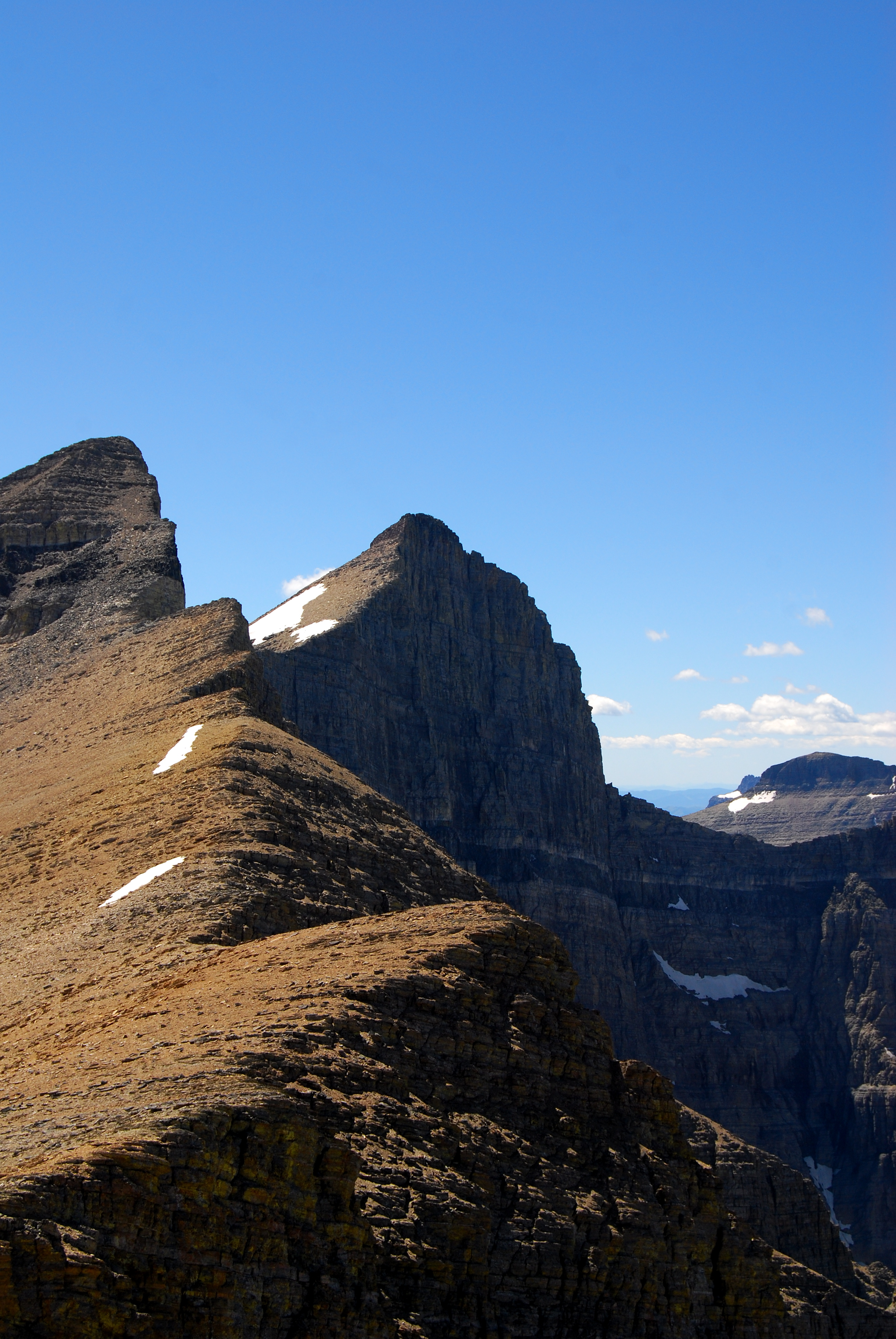
- Cracker Peak and Mount Siyeh as viewed from the "Skyline Experience"

Highest point
- Elevation: 10,019 ft (3,054 m)
- Prominence: 3,106 ft (947 m)
- Parent peak: Mount Cleveland
- Listing: Mountains in Glacier County, Montana
- Coordinates: 48°43′45″N 113°38′59″W

Geography
- Location within Montana
- Location: Glacier County, Montana, U.S.
- Parent range: Lewis Range
- Topo map(s): USGS Logan Pass, MT

Climbing
- First ascent: 1924 (Norman Clyde)

Mount Siyeh, with a height of 10,019 feet (3,054 m), is the fifth tallest and one of six peaks over 10,000 feet (3,048 m) in Glacier National Park, Montana, United States. Mount Siyeh was named after a Blackfeet Native American, Sai-yeh, whose name means "Crazy Dog" or "Mad Wolf."

Mount Siyeh stands about two miles east of the Continental Divide, within the watershed of the Saint Mary River, which drains into the Saskatchewan River, and ultimately into Hudson Bay.

Mount Siyeh is rather easily accessible from a variety of different routes. It can be ascended via a long scree scramble from the Preston Park area, or from Piegan Pass via Cataract Mountain. The summit can also be reached via a long hiking/mountaineering route dubbed the "Skyline Experience"; this route starts from the Many Glacier Hotel and involves 5.5 miles (9 km) ridge walk and includes the summits of Wynn Mountain (8,404 feet (2,562 m)) and Cracker Peak (9,833 feet (2,997 m)) before reaching the top of Siyeh.
Route Descriptions can be found on Summitpost or in A Climbers Guide to Glacier National Park.

== Geology ==
Like other mountains in Glacier National Park, it is composed of sedimentary rock laid down during the Precambrian to Jurassic periods. Formed in shallow seas, this sedimentary rock was initially uplifted beginning 170 million years ago when the Lewis Overthrust fault pushed an enormous slab of precambrian rocks 3 mi (4.8 km) thick, 50 miles (80 km) wide and 160 miles (260 km) long over younger rock of the cretaceous period.

== Climate ==
Based on the Köppen climate classification, it is located in an alpine subarctic climate zone with long, cold, snowy winters, and cool to warm summers. Winter temperatures can drop below −10 °F with wind chill factors below −30 °F.

The peak of Mount Siyeh has a tundra climate (Köppen ET) or an Alpine climate.

Climate data for Mount Siyeh 48.7266 N, 113.6529 W, Elevation: 9,147 ft (2,788 m) (1991–2020 normals)
Month	Jan	Feb	Mar	Apr	May	Jun	Jul	Aug	Sep	Oct	Nov	Dec	Year
Mean daily maximum °F (°C)	21.6 (−5.8)	21.4 (−5.9)	25.9 (−3.4)	31.2 (−0.4)	40.5 (4.7)	48.2 (9.0)	59.1 (15.1)	59.7 (15.4)	51.1 (10.6)	37.6 (3.1)	25.5 (−3.6)	20.4 (−6.4)	36.9 (2.7)
Daily mean °F (°C)	15.2 (−9.3)	14.0 (−10.0)	17.1 (−8.3)	21.9 (−5.6)	30.5 (−0.8)	37.7 (3.2)	47.4 (8.6)	47.6 (8.7)	39.6 (4.2)	28.5 (−1.9)	19.4 (−7.0)	14.4 (−9.8)	27.8 (−2.3)
Mean daily minimum °F (°C)	8.9 (−12.8)	6.6 (−14.1)	8.3 (−13.2)	12.6 (−10.8)	20.4 (−6.4)	27.2 (−2.7)	35.6 (2.0)	35.5 (1.9)	28.2 (−2.1)	19.4 (−7.0)	13.4 (−10.3)	8.5 (−13.1)	18.7 (−7.4)
Average precipitation inches (mm)	13.77 (350)	12.02 (305)	11.60 (295)	9.71 (247)	9.43 (240)	11.25 (286)	3.80 (97)	3.74 (95)	6.21 (158)	10.67 (271)	13.32 (338)	14.15 (359)	119.67 (3,041)
Source: PRISM Climate Group

== Gallery ==
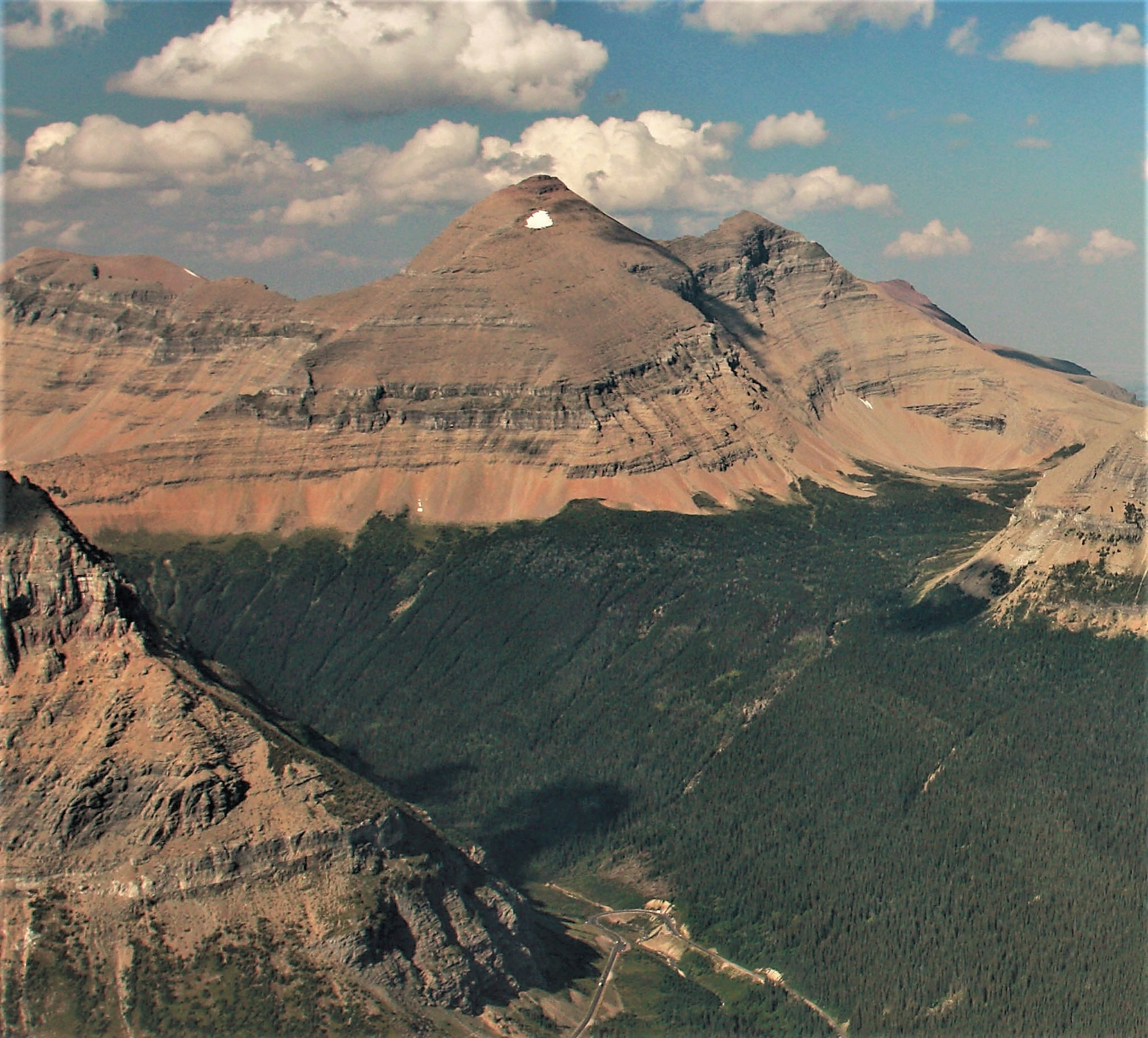
Aerial view of Mount Siyeh

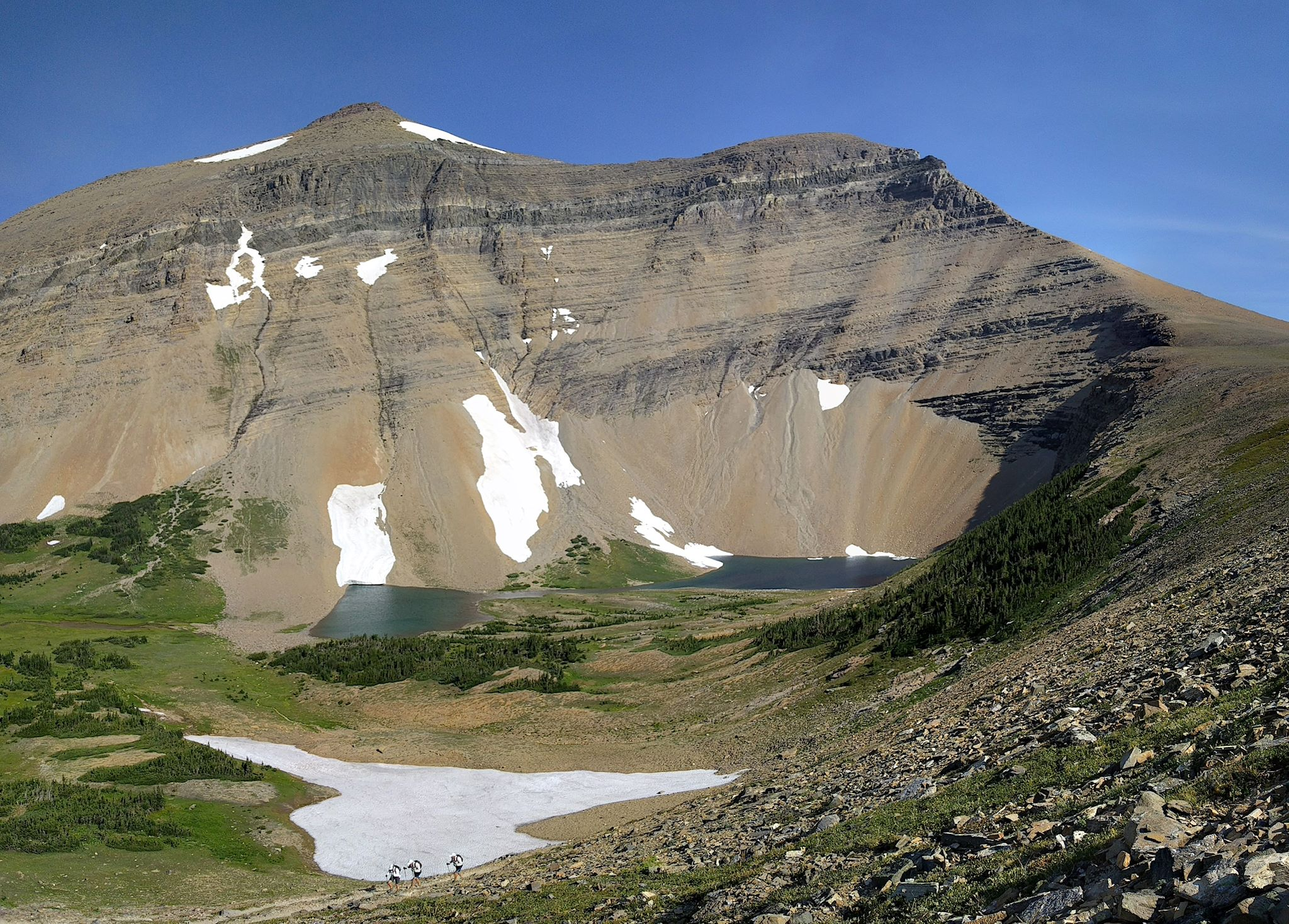
Mount Siyeh and Preston Park seen from Siyeh Pass

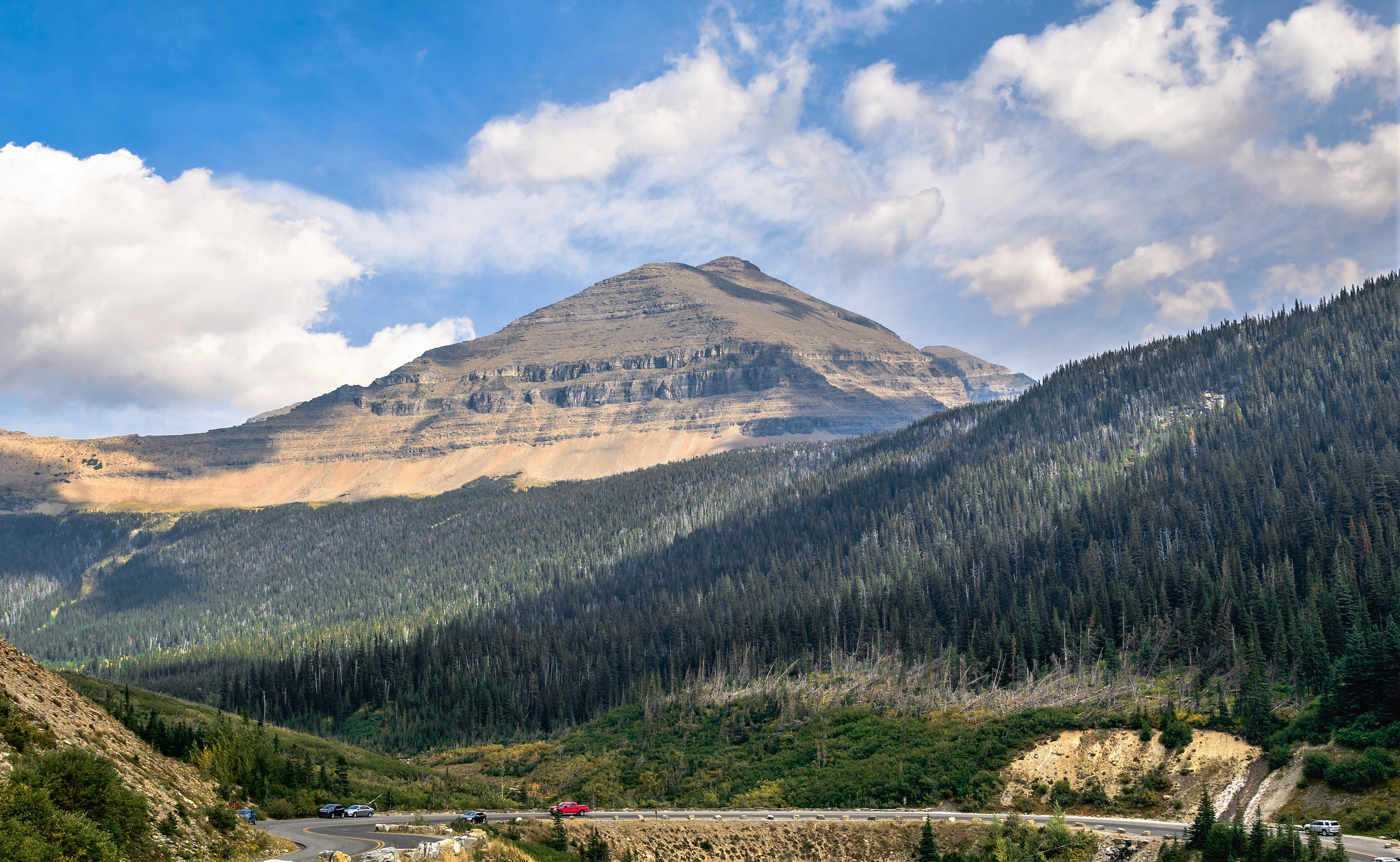
Mount Siyeh from Siyeh Bend along Going-to-the-Sun Road

== See also ==
- List of mountains and mountain ranges of Glacier National Park (U.S.)
