= Bear Mountain (Glacier County, Montana) =

Mountain in Montana, United States

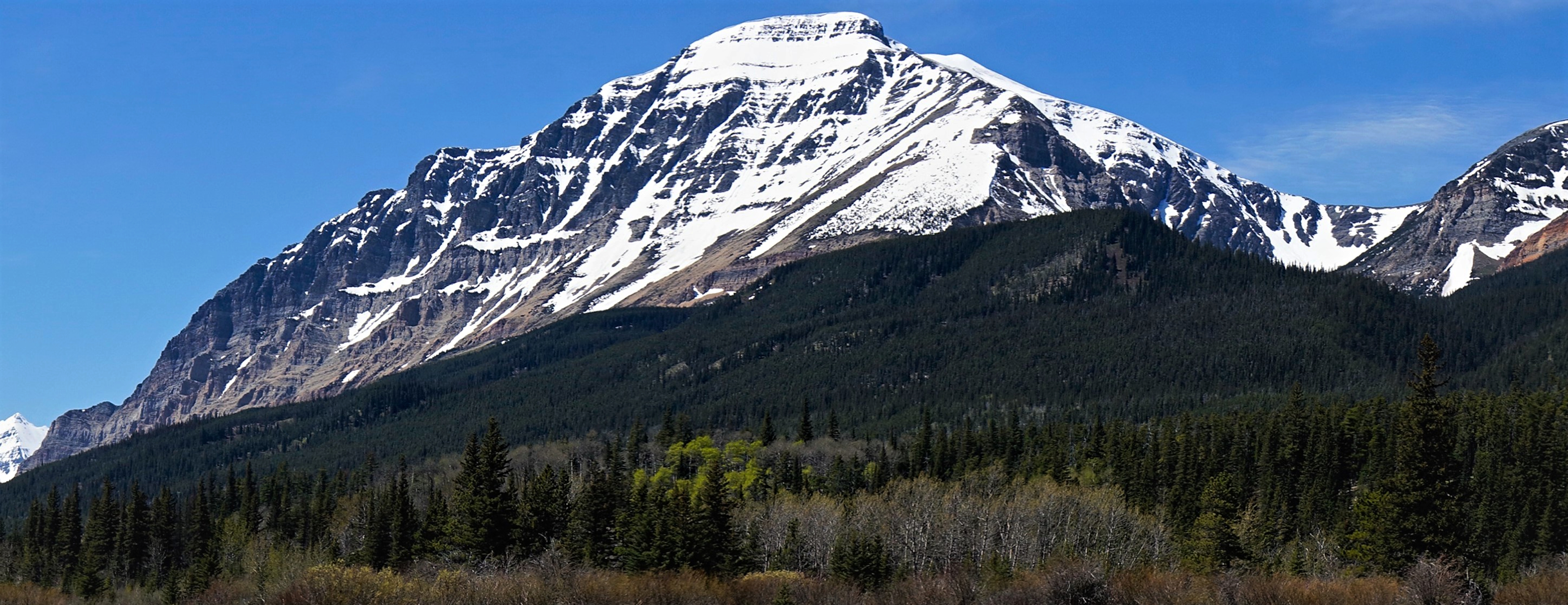

Highest point
- Elevation: 8,841 ft (2,695 m)
- Prominence: 841 ft (256 m)
- Parent peak: Kaina Mountain (9,489 ft)
- Isolation: 1.86 mi (2.99 km)
- Coordinates: 48°57′18″N 113°45′27″W

Geography
- Location within Montana Location within the United States
- Location: Glacier County, Montana, U.S.
- Parent range: Lewis Range
- Topo map: USGS Mount Cleveland

Bear Mountain (8,841 feet (2,695 m)) is located in the northern Lewis Range, Glacier National Park in the U.S. state of Montana. Cosley Lake, followed by Glenns Lake to the southwest of the mountain. Mokowanis Lake is also visible from the peak. The mountain has tremendous views of the east face of Mount Cleveland, the north face of Mount Merritt, and the east face of Chief Mountain.

== Climate ==
Bear Mountain is located in an alpine subarctic climate zone characterized by long, usually very cold winters, and short, cool to mild summers. Winter temperatures can drop below −10 °F with wind chill factors below −30 °F.

== Geology ==
Like the other mountains in Glacier National Park, Bear Mountain is composed of sedimentary rock laid down during the Precambrian to Jurassic periods. Formed in shallow seas, this sedimentary rock was initially uplifted beginning 170 million years ago when the Lewis Overthrust fault pushed an enormous slab of precambrian rocks 3 mi (4.8 km) thick, 50 miles (80 km) wide and 160 miles (260 km) long over younger rock of the cretaceous period.

== Gallery ==
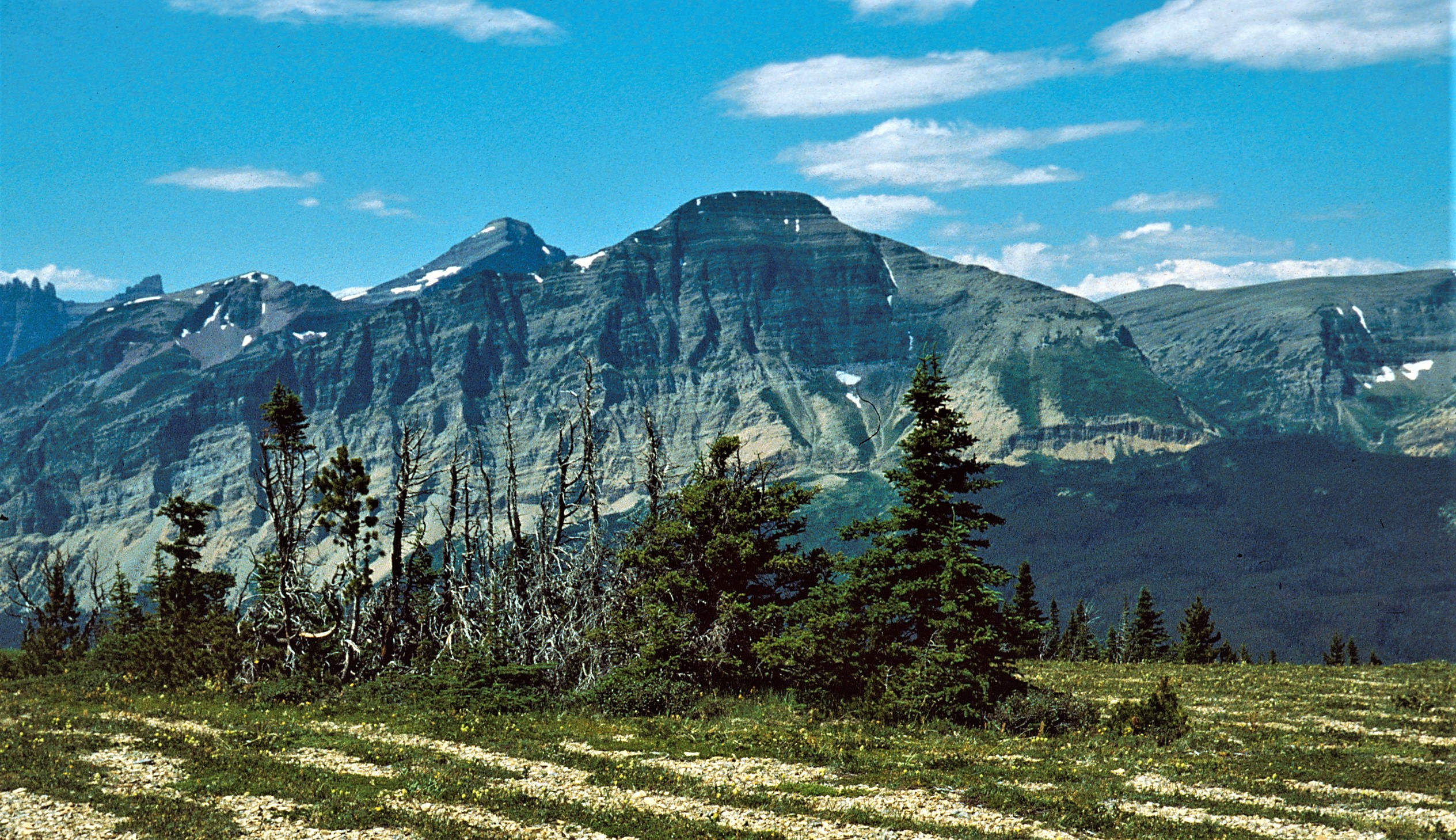
East aspect, with top of parent Kaina Mountain behind left

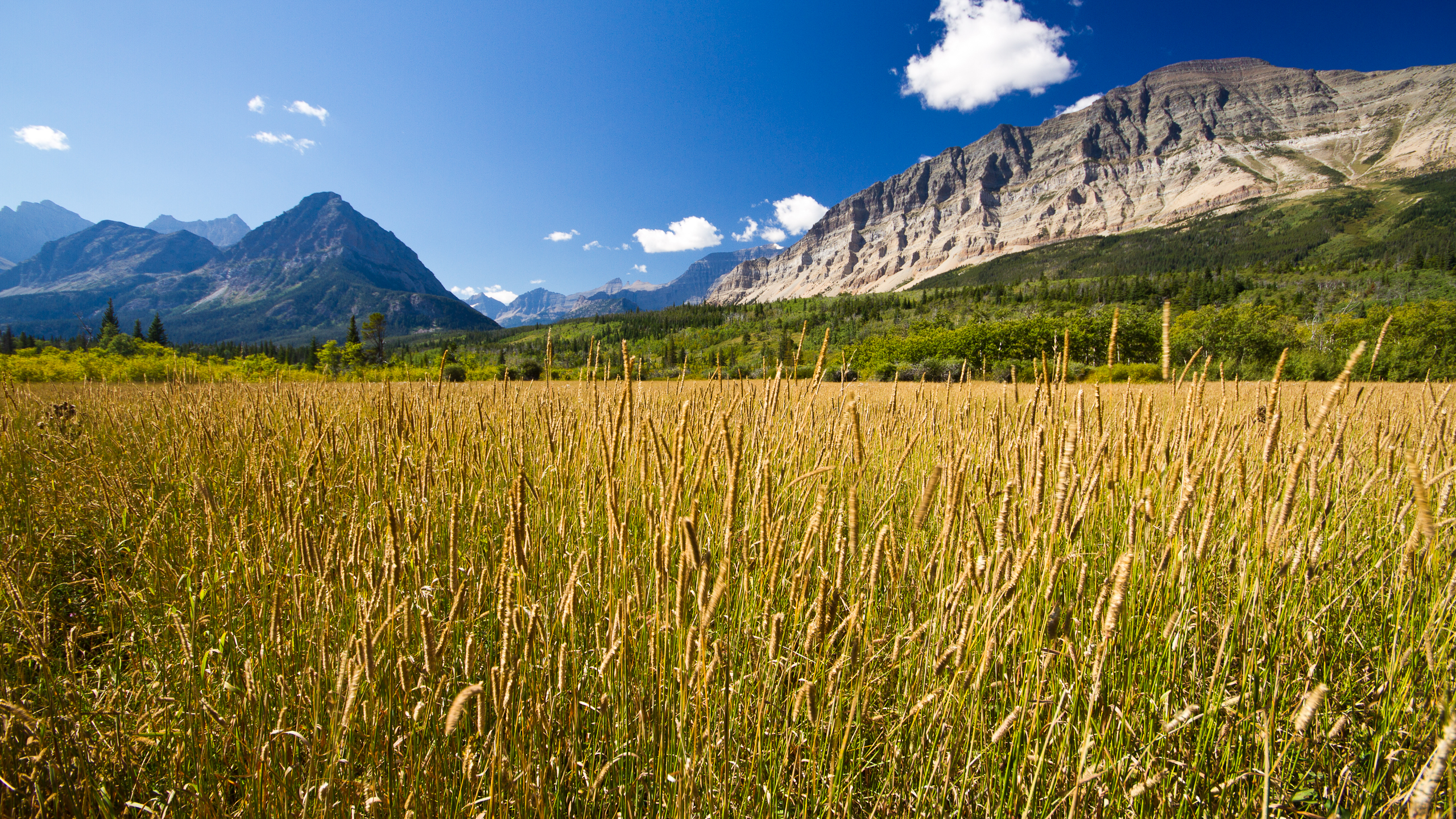
East aspect of Bear Mountain (right)

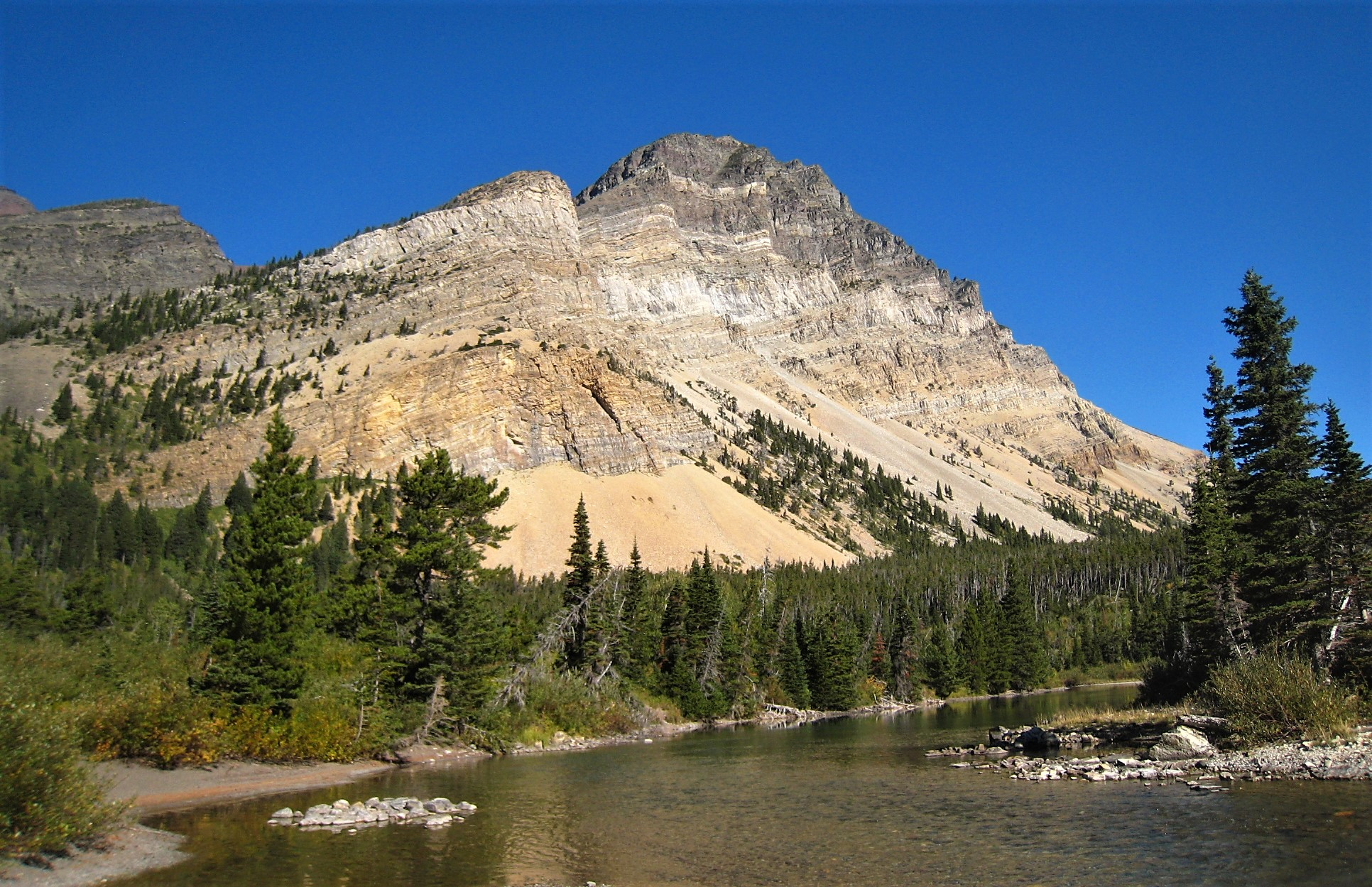
Bear Mountain, south aspect

== See also ==
- Mountains and mountain ranges of Glacier National Park (U.S.)
