= Ipasha Falls =

- Location within Montana
- Location: Glacier National Park (U.S.), Montana, U.S.
- Coordinates: 48°50′54″N 113°48′25″W
- Type: Cascade/Fall
- Total height: 800 ft (244 m)

Ipasha Falls is a waterfall located in Glacier National Park, Montana, US. Ipasha Falls descends from Ipasha Glacier to Ipasha Lake and is recorded as having a drop of at least 800 feet (240 m). Located in a remote region north of Many Glacier, the falls can only been seen by a multiday hike on established trails to Mokowanis Lake and then from there along unmaintained trails to Ipasha Lake.
