= Helen Lake =

Lake in Montana, United States

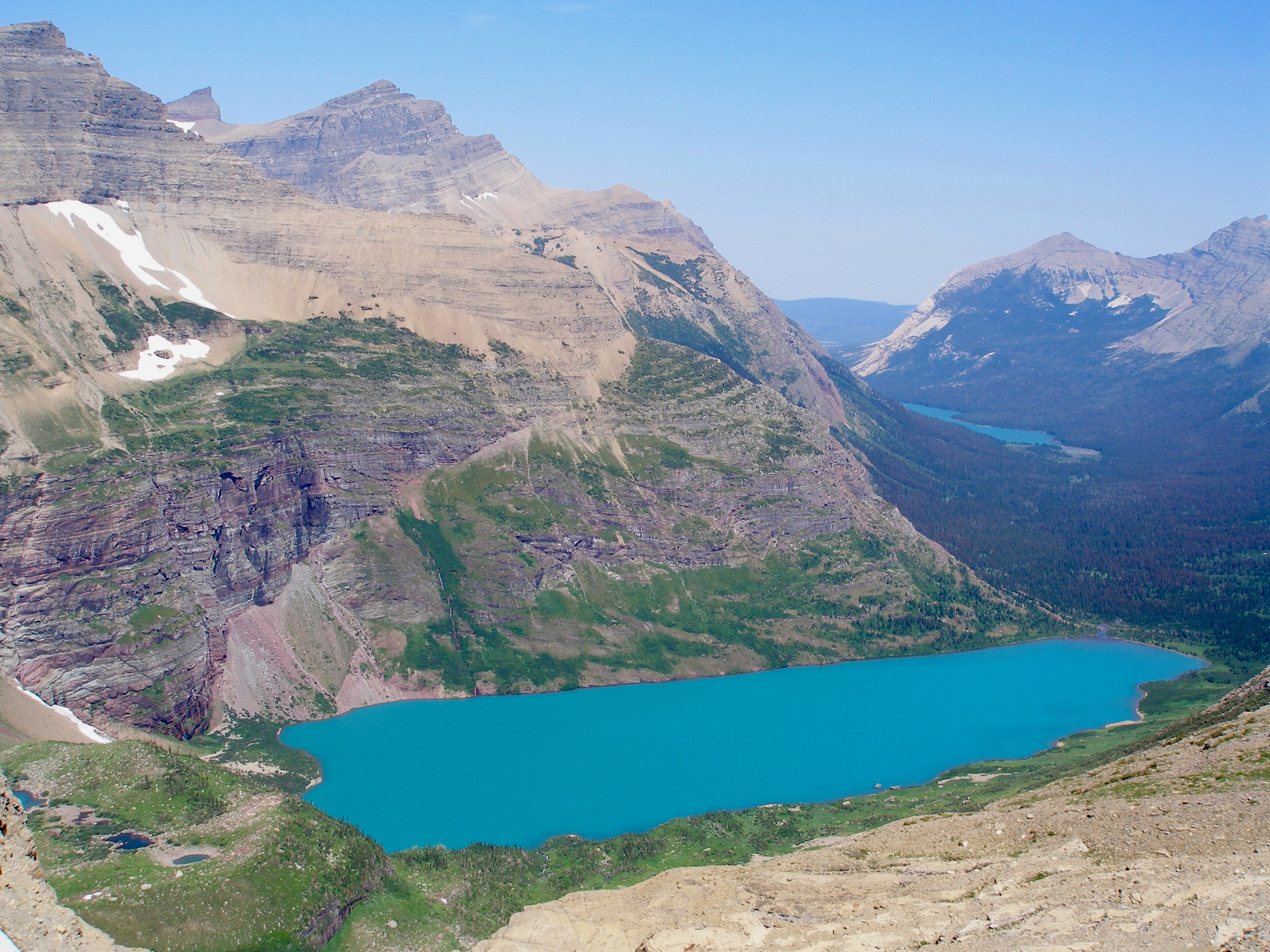
- From the south. Natoas Peak in the back left.

- Location within Montana Location within the United States
- Location: Glacier National Park, Glacier County, Montana, U.S.
- Coordinates: 48°50′16″N 113°45′24″W
- Lake type: Natural
- Primary outflows: Belly River
- Basin countries: United States
- Max. length: 1 mi (1.6 km)
- Max. width: 0.30 mi (0.48 km)
- Surface elevation: 5,085 ft (1,550 m)

Helen Lake is located in Glacier National Park, in the U.S. state of Montana. Helen Lake is at the head of the Belly River and is situated below Ahern Peak to the west and Ipasha Peak to the northwest. Numerous small streams feed the lake in addition to melt waters from the Ahern Glacier which descend 1,680 feet (510 m) over Ahern Glacier Falls in one sheer drop to a talus slope below en route to the lake.

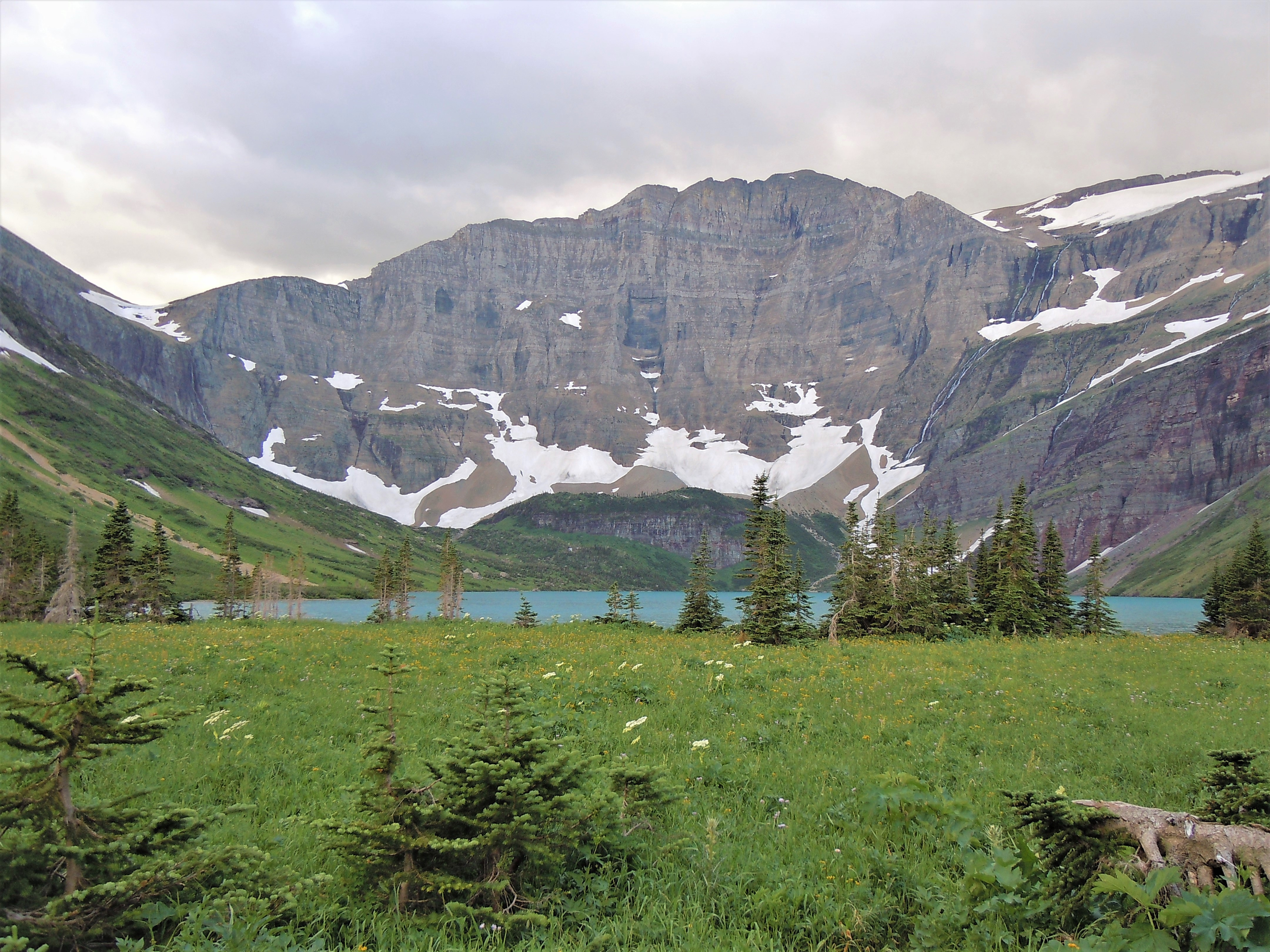
Ahern Peak and Helen Lake as seen from the east.

== See also ==
- List of lakes in Glacier County, Montana
