= Ipasha Peak =

Mountain in Montana, United States

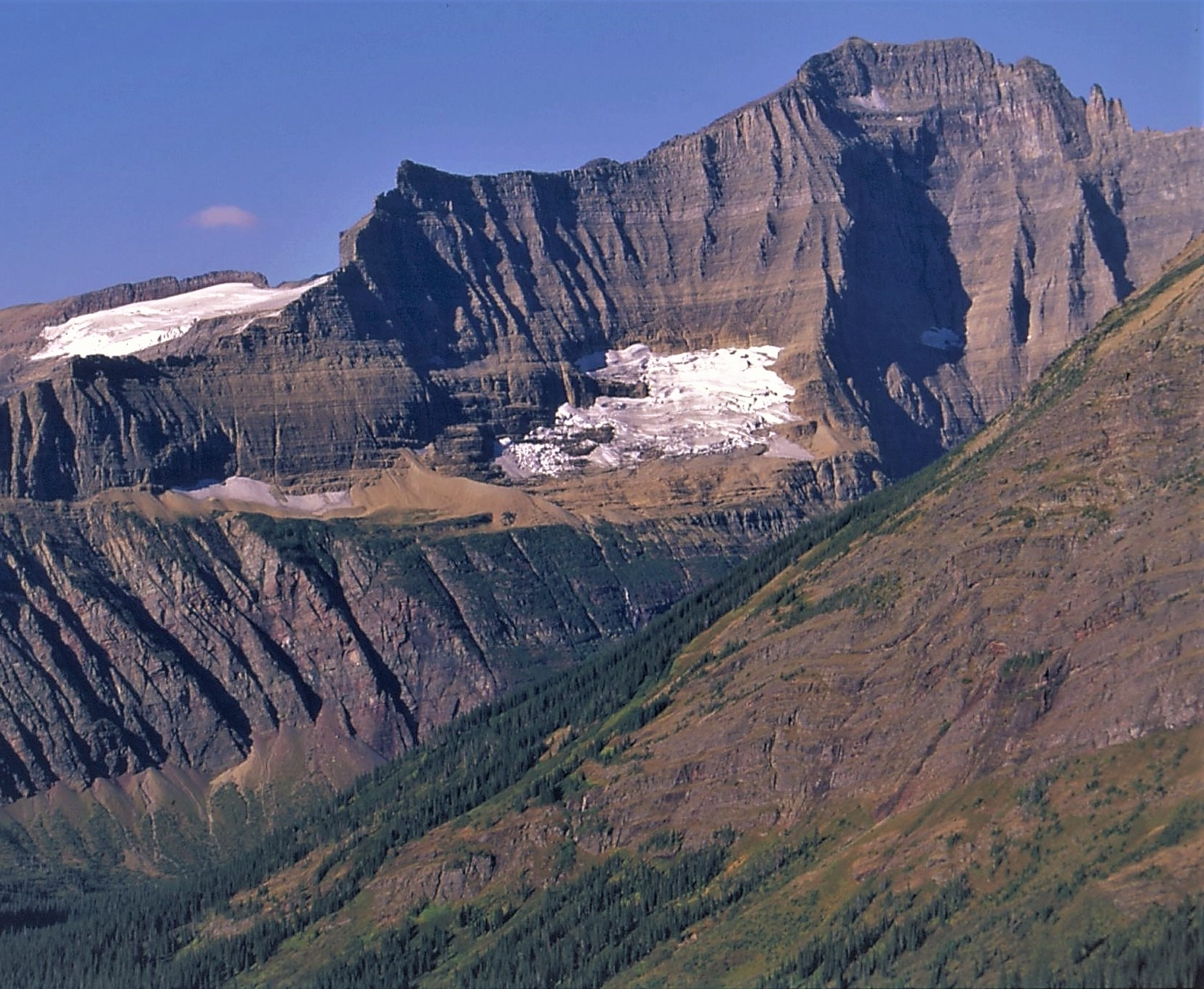
- Ipasha Peak, east aspect

Highest point
- Elevation: 9,577 ft (2,919 m)
- Prominence: 1,172 ft (357 m)
- Coordinates: 48°51′06″N 113°47′11″W

Geography
- Location within Montana Location within the United States
- Location: Glacier County, Montana, U.S.
- Parent range: Lewis Range
- Topo map(s): USGS Ahern Pass, MT

Ipasha Peak (9,577 feet (2,919 m)) is located in the Lewis Range, Glacier National Park in the U.S. state of Montana. Ipasha Peak is 1.29 miles (2.08 km) south of Mount Merritt and is in the northeastern section of Glacier National Park. Ahern Glacier is located on the southeastern slopes of the mountain while the Ipasha Glacier is to the southwest of the peak. Helen Lake lies almost 4,500 feet (1,400 m) below the summit of Ipasha Peak to the southeast.

== Climate ==
Based on the Köppen climate classification, it is located in an alpine subarctic climate zone with long, cold, snowy winters, and cool to warm summers. Temperatures can drop below −10 °F with wind chill factors below −30 °F.

== Geology ==
Like other mountains in Glacier National Park, it is composed of sedimentary rock laid down during the Precambrian to Jurassic periods. Formed in shallow seas, this sedimentary rock was initially uplifted beginning 170 million years ago when the Lewis Overthrust fault pushed an enormous slab of precambrian rocks 3 mi (4.8 km) thick, 50 miles (80 km) wide and 160 miles (260 km) long over younger rock of the cretaceous period.

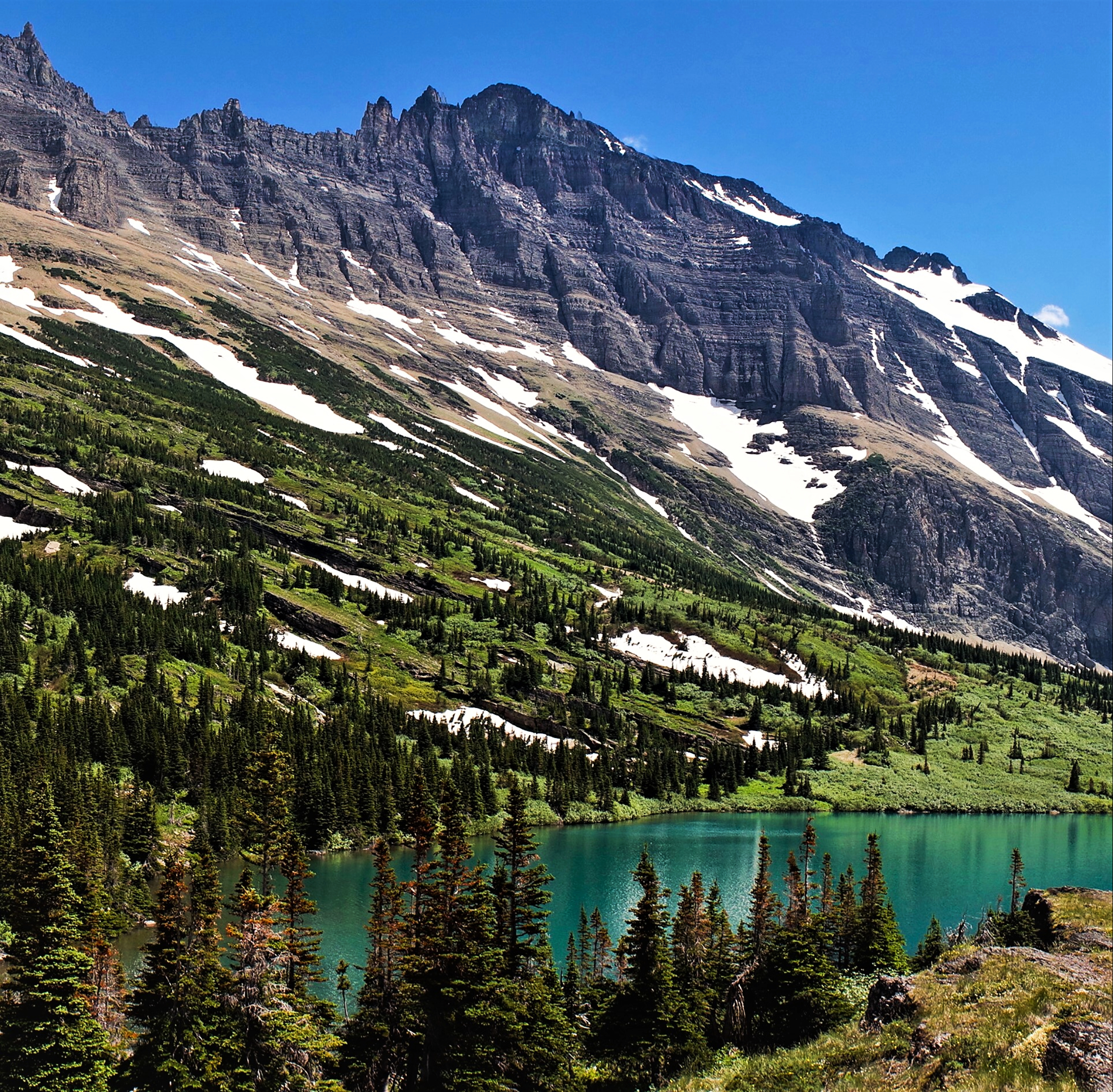
Northwest aspect

== See also ==
- Mountains and mountain ranges of Glacier National Park (U.S.)
