= Mount Kaina =

Mount Kaina may refer to:

- Kaina Mountain, located in Glacier National Park in the U.S. state of Montana
- Mount Kaina (戒那山), former name of Mount Yamato Katsuragi, located in Osaka and Nara Prefectures in Japan
