= Cosley Lake =

Lake in Glacier National Park, Montana, U.S.

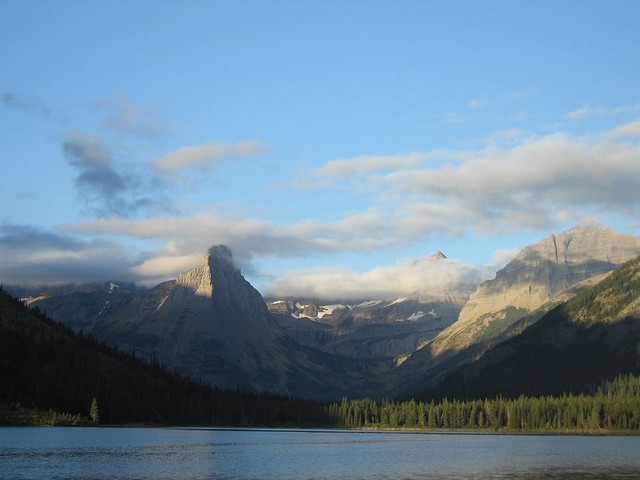
- Cosley Lake

- Location within Montana Location within the United States
- Location: Glacier National Park, Glacier County, Montana, US
- Coordinates: 48°55′20″N 113°45′37″W
- Lake type: Natural
- Primary inflows: Mokowanis River
- Primary outflows: Mokowanis River
- Basin countries: United States
- Max. length: 1.25 mi (2.01 km)
- Max. width: .35 mi (0.56 km)
- Surface elevation: 4,842 ft (1,476 m)

Cosley Lake is located in Glacier National Park, in the U. S. state of Montana. Cosley Lake is .35 miles (0.56 km) northeast of Glenns Lake and between Bear Mountain to the north and Cosley Ridge to the south.

== See also ==
- List of lakes in Glacier County, Montana
