= Ipasha Lake =

Lake in Glacier County, Montana, United States

- Location within Montana Location within the United States
- Location: Glacier National Park, Glacier County, Montana, US
- Coordinates: 48°51′10″N 113°48′24″W
- Lake type: Natural
- Primary outflows: Pyramid Creek
- Basin countries: United States
- Max. length: .42 mi (0.68 km)
- Max. width: .20 mi (0.32 km)
- Surface elevation: 5,660 ft (1,730 m)

Ipasha Lake is located in Glacier National Park, in the U. S. state of Montana. Ipasha Lake is west of Ipasha Peak which rises more than 4,000 feet (1,200 m) above the lake. Melt water from the Ipasha Glacier descends 580 feet (180 m) over Ipasha Falls en route to Ipasha Lake.

== See also ==
- List of lakes in Glacier County, Montana
