= Sentinel Mountain (Montana) =

Mountain in Montana, United States

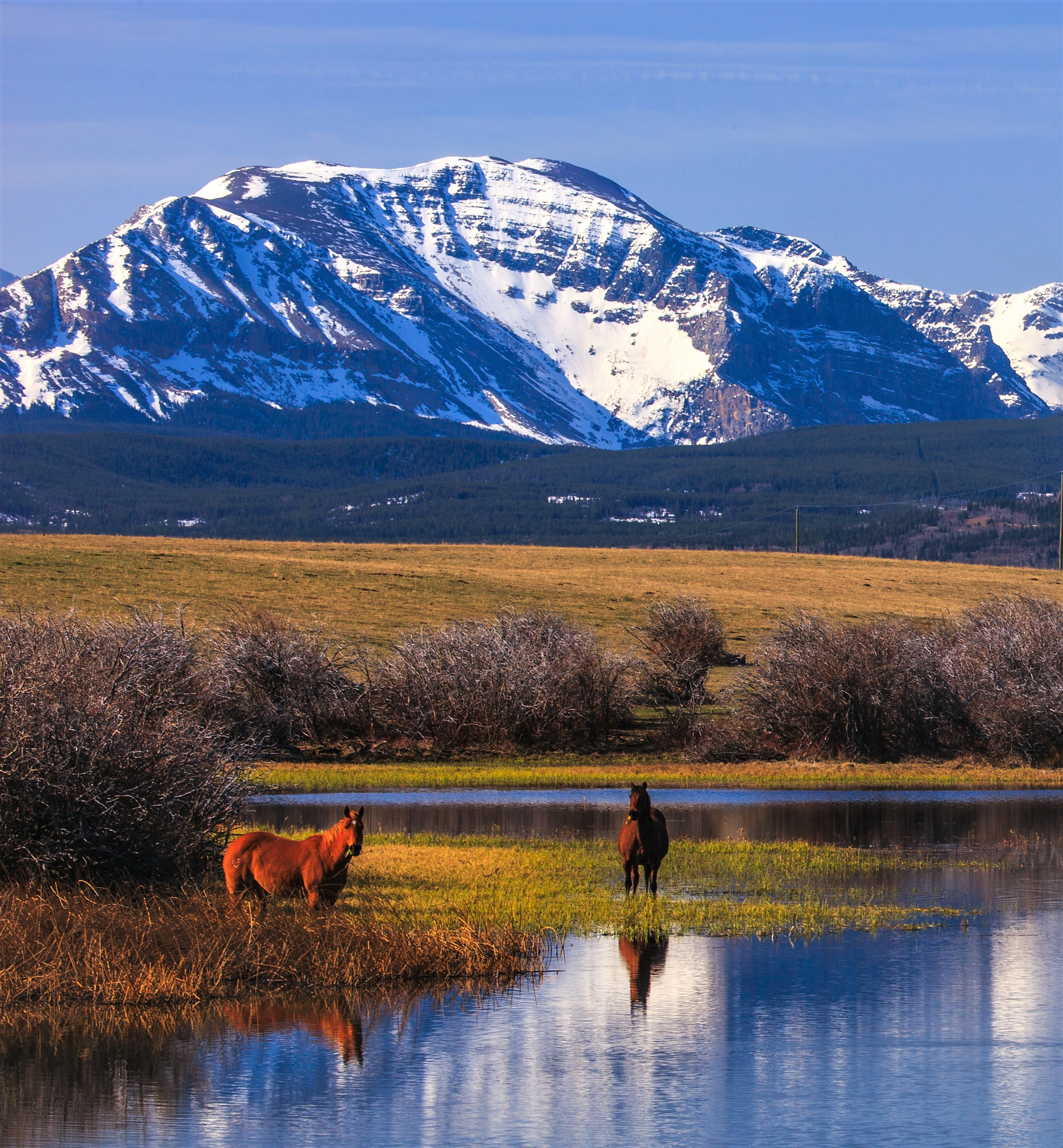
- Northeast aspect

Highest point
- Elevation: 8,245 ft (2,513 m)
- Prominence: 583 ft (178 m)
- Parent peak: Bear Mountain (8,841 ft)
- Isolation: 1.72 mi (2.77 km)
- Coordinates: 48°58′45″N 113°44′46″W

Geography
- Location within Montana Location within the United States
- Location: Glacier National Park; Glacier County, Montana, US
- Parent range: Lewis Range; Rocky Mountains
- Topo map: USGS Gable Mountain

Sentinel Mountain is an 8,245-foot-elevation (2,513-meter) summit in Glacier County, Montana, United States.

== Description ==
Sentinel Mountain is located 1.3 miles (2.1 km) south of the Canada–United States border in the Belly River area of Glacier National Park. It is situated in the Lewis Range, seven miles northwest of landmark Chief Mountain, and approximately 15 miles east of the Continental Divide. Precipitation runoff from the mountain drains into tributaries of the Belly River. Topographic relief is significant as the summit rises nearly 2,900 feet (880 meters) above the North Fork Belly River in one mile. The mountain's toponym was officially adopted in 1929 by the United States Board on Geographic Names.

== Geology ==
Like other mountains in Glacier National Park, Sentinel Mountain is composed of sedimentary rock laid down during the Precambrian to Jurassic periods. Formed in shallow seas, this sedimentary rock was initially uplifted beginning 170 million years ago when the Lewis Overthrust fault pushed an enormous slab of precambrian rocks 3 mi (4.8 km) thick, 50 miles (80 km) wide and 160 miles (260 km) long over younger rock of the cretaceous period.

== Climate ==
According to the Köppen climate classification system, Sentinel Mountain is located in an alpine subarctic climate zone with long, cold, snowy winters, and cool to warm summers. Winter temperatures can drop below −10 °F with wind chill factors below −30 °F. Due to its altitude, it receives precipitation all year, as snow in winter, and as thunderstorms in summer.

== See also ==
- Mountains and mountain ranges of Glacier National Park (U.S.)
- Geology of the Rocky Mountains
