= Ahern Glacier =

Ahern Glacier may refer to:

- Ahern Glacier (Antarctica) on the continent of Antarctica
- Ahern Glacier (Montana) in Glacier National Park, Montana, USA
