= Old Sun Glacier =

Glacier in Montana, United States

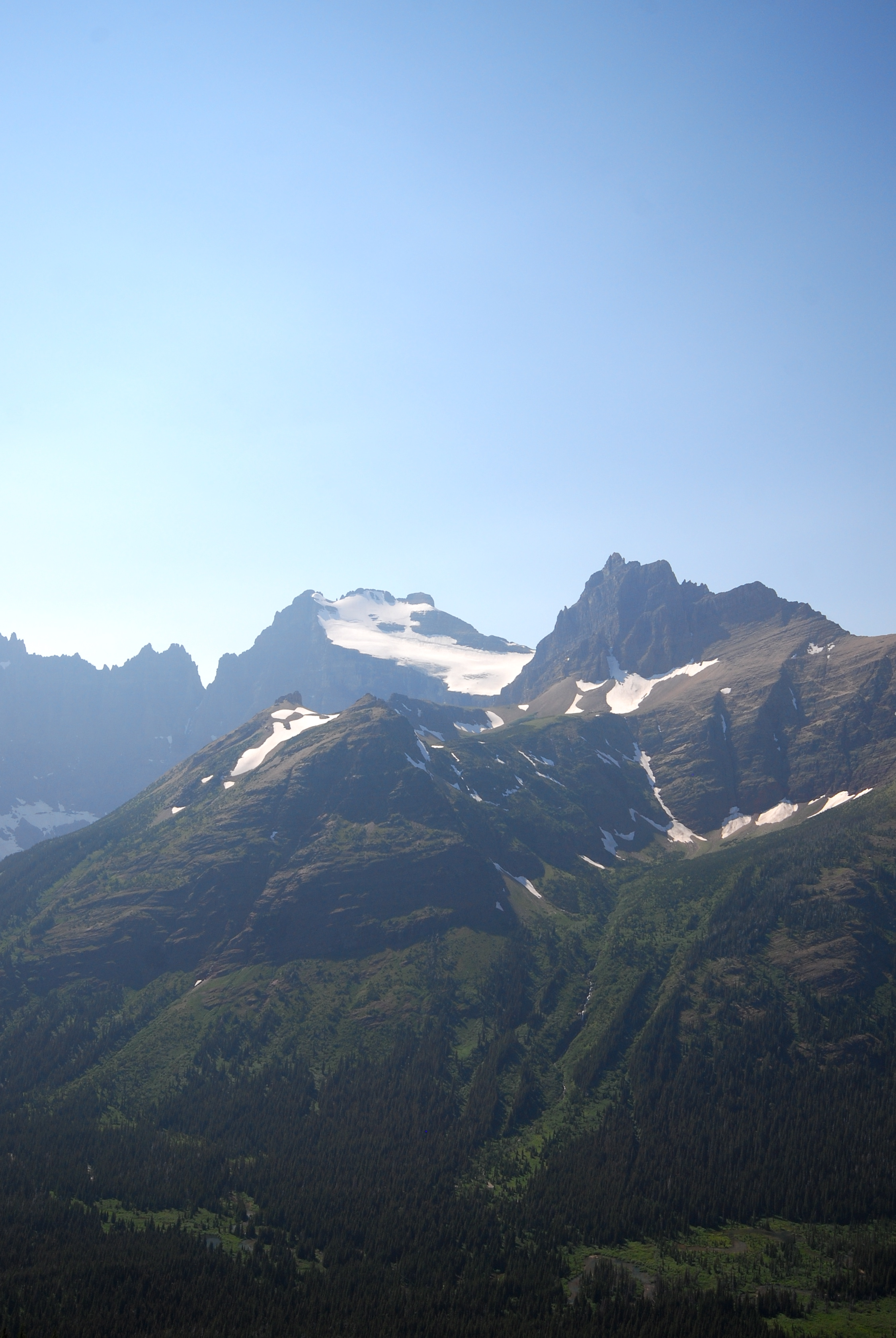
- Old Sun Glacier is the prominent snowfield in the background on the north slope of Mount Merritt at center

- Location within Montana
- Type: Mountain glacier
- Location: Glacier National Park, Glacier County, Montana, U.S.
- Coordinates: 48°52′21″N 113°46′38″W
- Area: Approximately 91 acres (0.37 km^{2}) in 2005
- Length: .30 mi (0.48 km)
- Terminus: Rockfall
- Status: Retreating

Old Sun Glacier is in Glacier National Park in the U.S. state of Montana. The glacier is situated immediately to the east and northeast of Mount Merritt at an elevation between 9,400 and 8,600 ft (2,900 and 2,600 m) above sea level. The glacier was named after a sun priest of the Blackfoot called "Ntas", translated to Old Sun. Old Sun Glacier has numerous crevasses and appears to have a healthy accumulation zone. Old Sun Glacier lost 12 percent of its surface area between 1966 and 2005.

== See also ==
- List of glaciers in the United States
- Glaciers in Glacier National Park (U.S.)
