= Belly River =

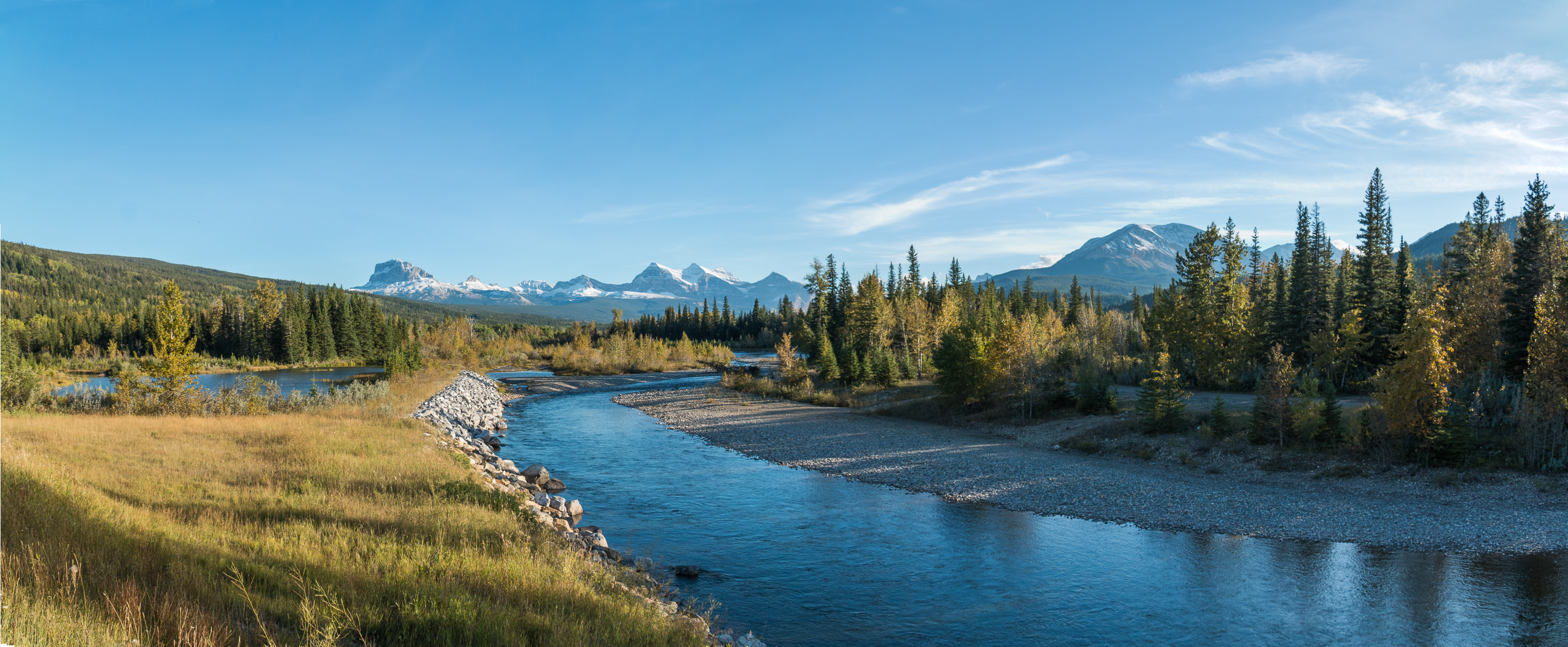
- The Belly River in Waterton Lakes National Park

Location
- Country: Canada, United States

Physical characteristics
- Source
  - location: Helen Lake
  - coordinates: 48.99373°N 113.66556°W
  - elevation: 1,570 meters (5,150 ft)
- Mouth
  - location: Oldman River
  - coordinates: 49.76884°N 113.03570°W
  - elevation: 875 meters (2,871 ft)

Basin features
- River system: Saskatchewan River

Belly River is a river in northwest Montana, United States and southern Alberta, Canada. It is a tributary of the Oldman River, itself a tributary of the South Saskatchewan River.

The name of the river may come from the Blackfoot word mokowan mokoan or Mokoansiitahtaa, meaning 'stomach' or 'stomach river'. The river was previously referred to as Mokowan River. Its Gros Ventre name is ʔinɔ́tɔnníícááh, also meaning 'belly river'.

The river gives the name to the Cretaceous age Belly River Formation, which was observed on its banks by George Mercer Dawson in 1883.

== Course ==
The Belly River originates in northwestern Montana at Helen Lake, near the base of Ahern Peak in Glacier National Park. It flows north across the 49th parallel north into Alberta near Chief Mountain, in the east of the Waterton Lakes National Park. It continues north, crossed by Highway 6 and Highway 5, passes near the communities of Hill Spring and Glenwood, then turns northeast. It is crossed by Highway 2 north of Stand Off, then continues north along the base of the Mokowan Ridge, where it receives the waters of the Waterton River. Its flow becomes meandered before the river turns east around the Wild Turnip Hill, then it empties into the Oldman River west of Coalhurst, south of Highway 3, at an elevation of 875 meters (2,871 ft).

== Tributaries ==
From spring to mouth, the Belly River receives the following tributaries:

- North Belly River
- Mami Creek
- Dipping Vat Lake
- Bullhorn Coulee
- Layton Creek
- Waterton River
- McNab Coulee

== See also ==
- List of rivers of Alberta
- List of rivers of Montana
- Montana Stream Access Law
