= Pyramid Peak (Montana) =

Mountain in Montana, United States

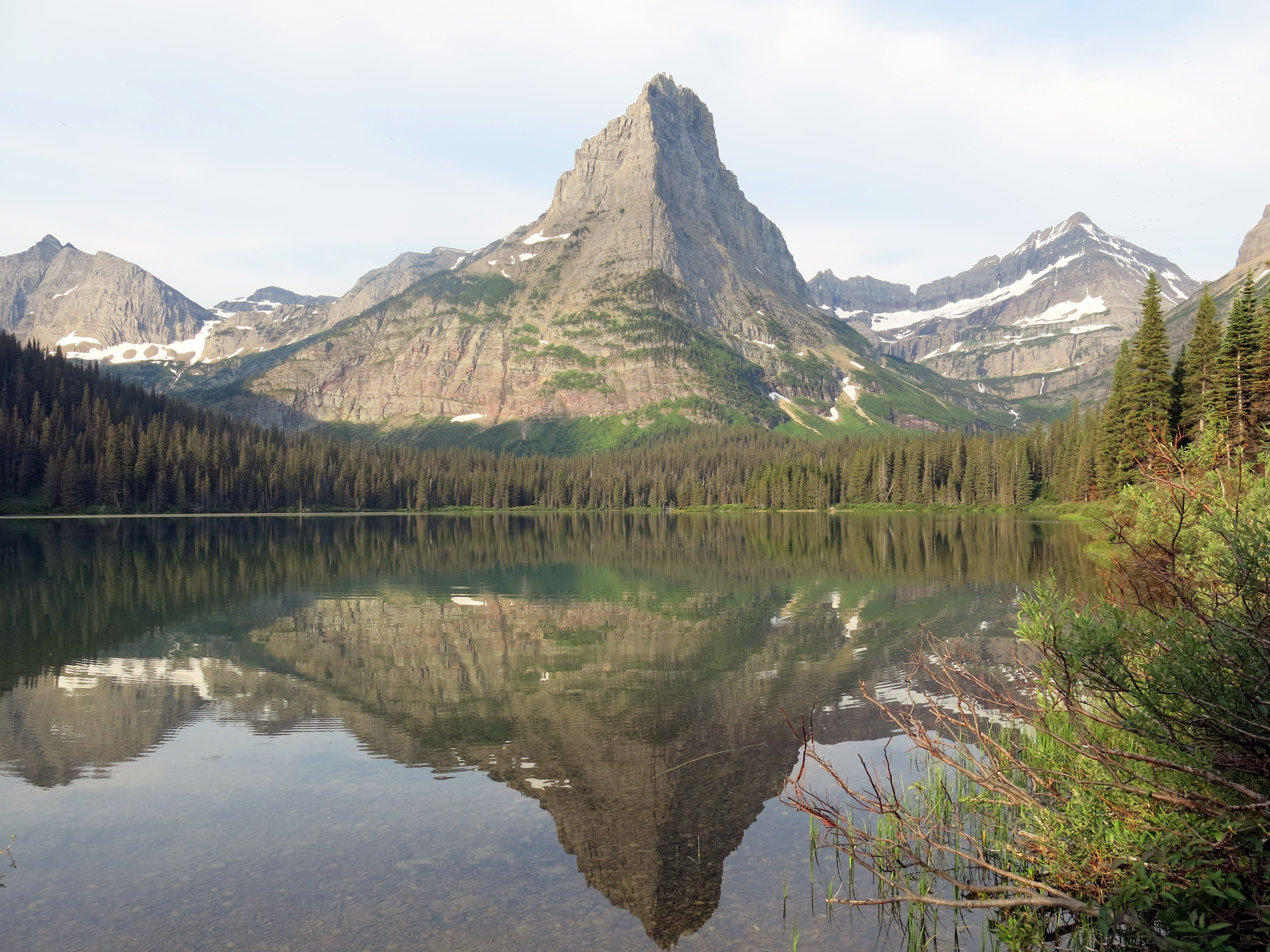
- Pyramid Peak, as seen from Glenns Lake.

Highest point
- Elevation: 8,200–8,280 ft (2,500–2,520 m)
- Prominence: 760 ft (230 m)
- Coordinates: 48°52′24″N 113°49′53″W

Geography
- Location within Montana Location within the United States
- Location: Glacier County, Montana, United States
- Parent range: Lewis Range
- Topo map(s): USGS Ahern Pass, MT

Pyramid Peak (8,200–8,280 feet (2,499–2,524 m)) is in the Lewis Range, Glacier National Park in the U.S. state of Montana. Mokowanis Lake lies just northeast of the peak, and Atsina Lake is to the west.

== Climate ==
Based on the Köppen climate classification, it is located in an alpine subarctic climate zone with long, cold, snowy winters, and cool to warm summers. Temperatures can drop below −10 °F with wind chill factors below −30 °F.

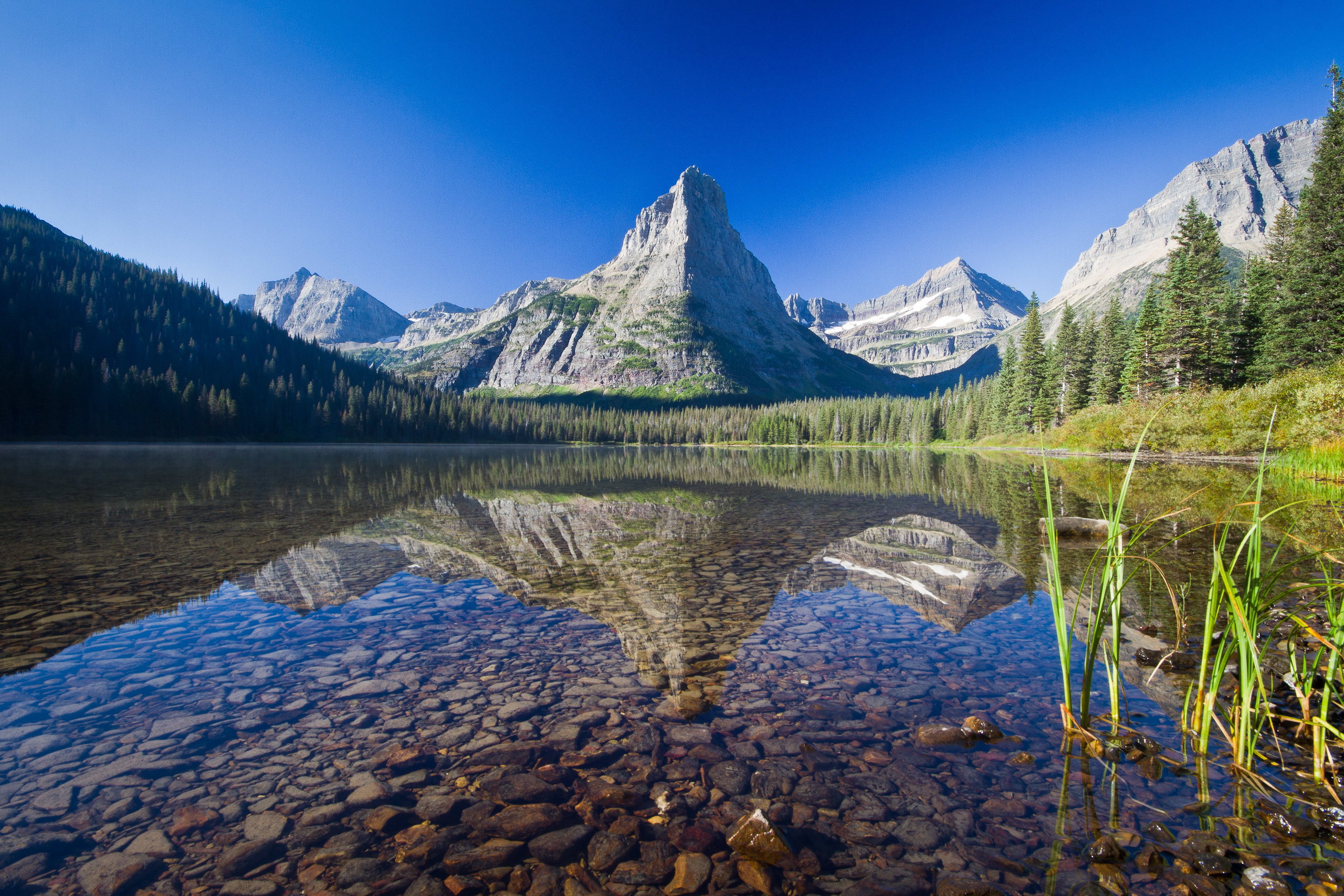
Glenns Lake, Pyramid Peak

== See also ==
- Mountains and mountain ranges of Glacier National Park (U.S.)
