= Ahern Glacier (Montana) =

Glacier in Montana, United States

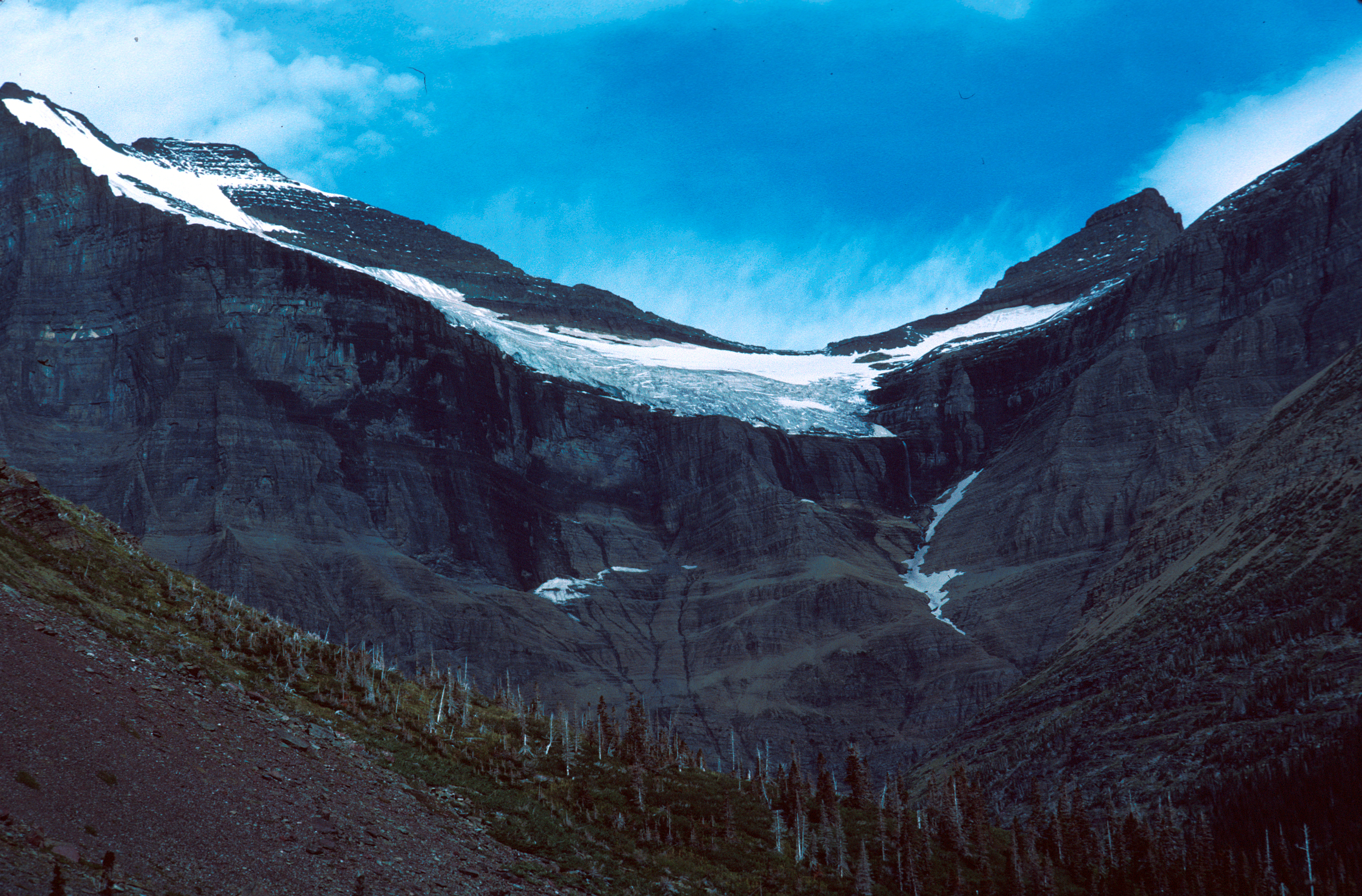
- Ahern Glacier seen from Helen Lake Trail

- Location within Montana
- Type: Mountain glacier
- Location: Glacier National Park, Glacier County, Montana, U.S.
- Coordinates: 48°50′34″N 113°47′02″W
- Area: 126 acres (51 ha) in 2005
- Terminus: Talus
- Status: Retreating

Ahern Glacier is in Glacier National Park in the U.S. state of Montana. The glacier was named after George Patrick Ahern. Ahern Glacier is situated on a ridge between Ipasha Peak to the north and Ahern Peak to the south at an elevation between 8,800 feet (2,700 m) and 8,000 feet (2,400 m) above sea level, immediately east of the Continental Divide. Meltwater from the glacier feeds Ahern Glacier Falls, a waterfall which descends an estimated 1,680 feet (510 m) in one sheer drop to a talus slope below en route to Helen Lake. Between 1966 and 2005, Ahern Glacier lost 13 percent of its surface area.

== See also ==
- List of glaciers in the United States
- Glaciers in Glacier National Park (U.S.)
