= Natoas Peak =

Mountain in Montana, United States

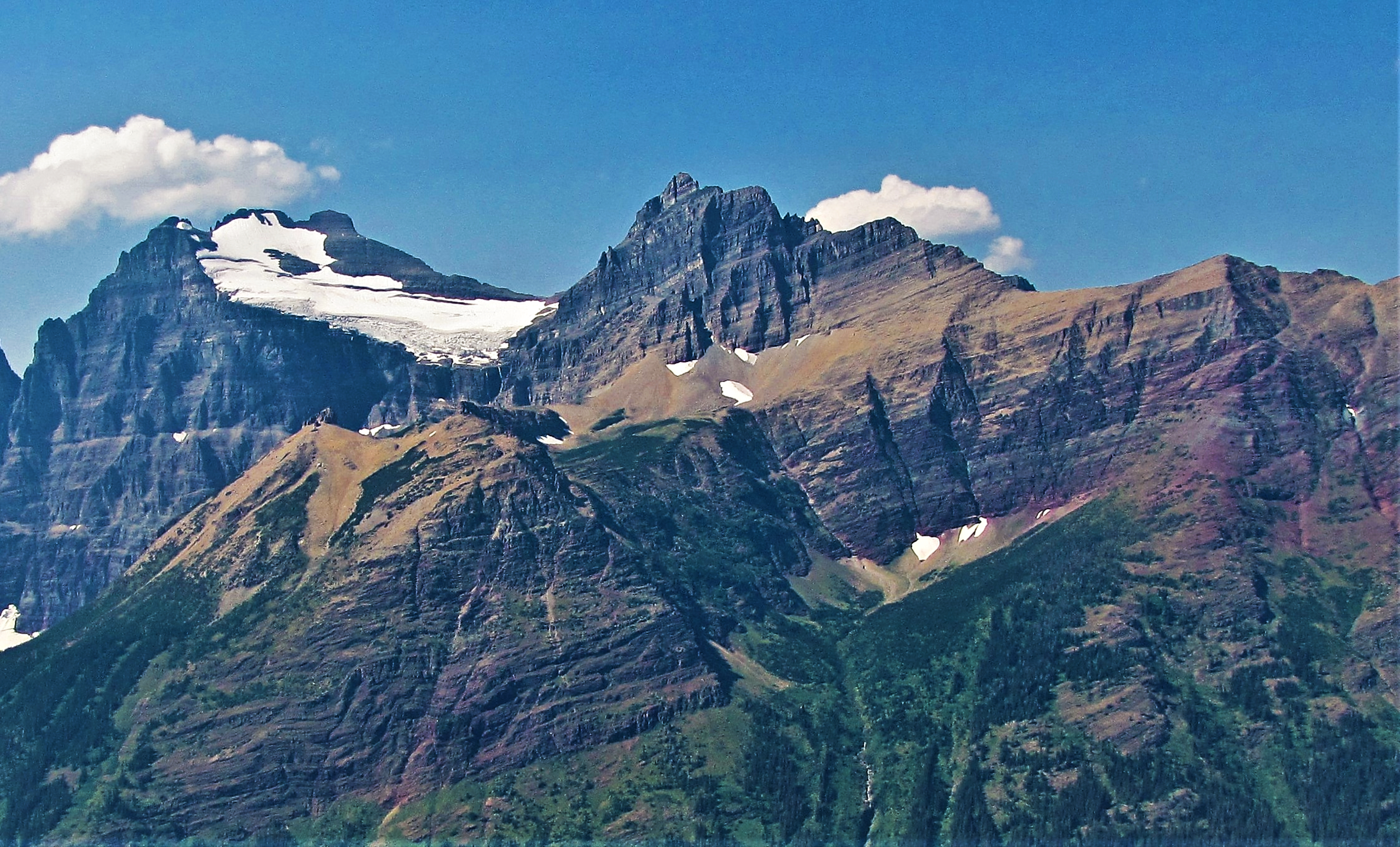
- Natoas Peak is the rugged summit centered and snowy Mount Merritt is to left

Highest point
- Elevation: 9,480 ft (2,890 m)
- Prominence: 596 ft (182 m)
- Coordinates: 48°52′29″N 113°45′47″W

Geography
- Location within Montana
- Location: Glacier County, Montana, U.S.
- Parent range: Lewis Range
- Topo map(s): USGS Ahern Pass, MT

Climbing
- First ascent: Bruce Murphy and Bill Mathews, August 1964

Natoas Peak (9,480 feet (2,890 m)) is located in the Lewis Range, Glacier National Park in the U.S. state of Montana. Natoas Peak is 1.10 miles (1.77 km) northeast of Mount Merritt.

First ascent by Bruce Murphy and Bill Mathews, August 1964.

== See also ==
- Mountains and mountain ranges of Glacier National Park (U.S.)
