= Glenns Lake =

Lake in Glacier County, Montana, United States

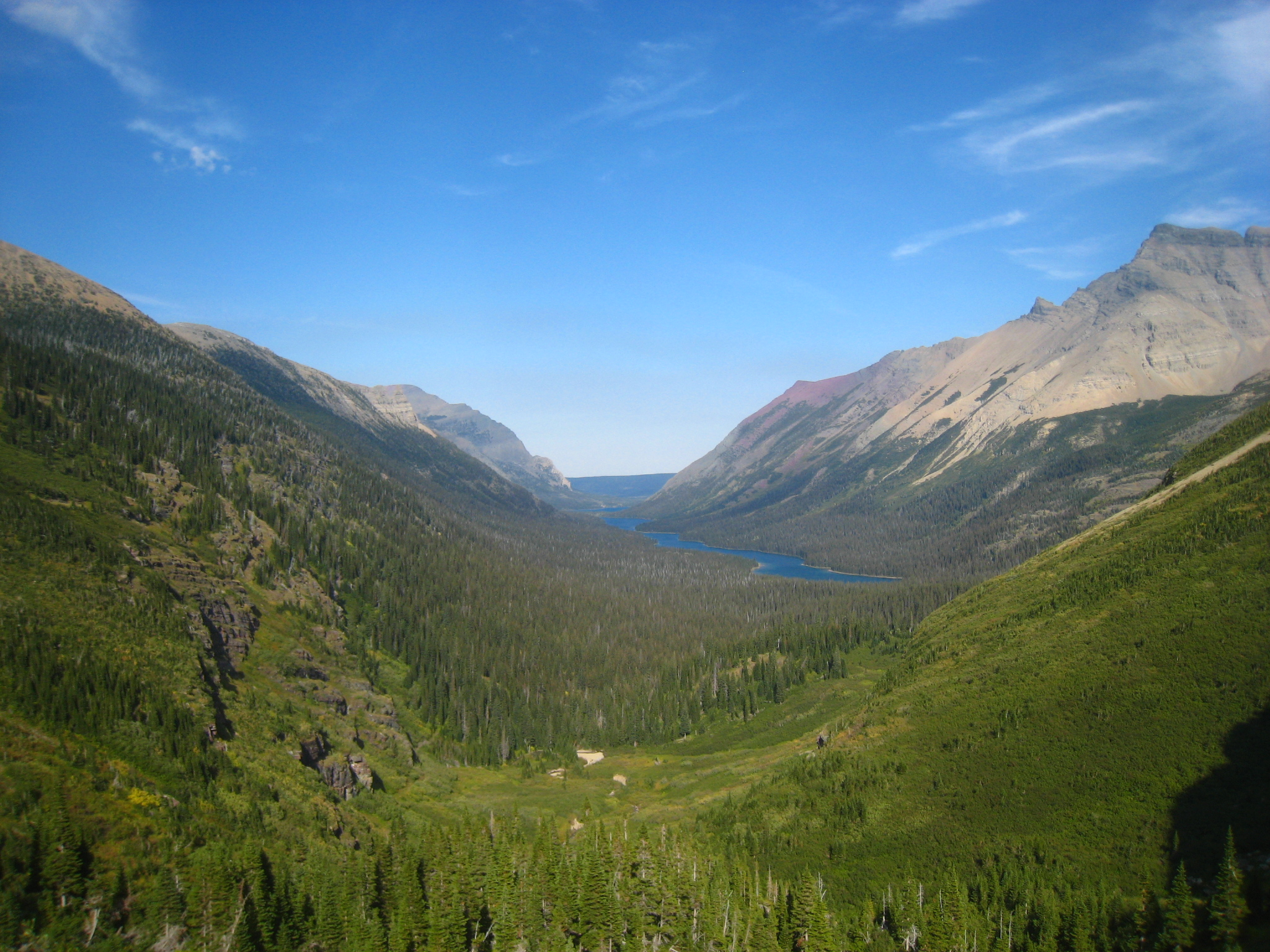
- Glenns Lake looking northeast with Whitecrow Mountain on the left and Cosley Ridge at right

- Location within Montana Location within the United States
- Location: Glacier National Park, Glacier County, Montana, US
- Coordinates: 48°54′12″N 113°47′33″W
- Lake type: Natural
- Primary inflows: Mokowanis River
- Primary outflows: Mokowanis River
- Basin countries: United States
- Max. length: 2.75 miles (4.43 km)
- Max. width: .20 miles (0.32 km)
- Surface elevation: 4,862 ft (1,482 m)

Glenns Lake is located in Glacier National Park, in the U. S. state of Montana. Glenns Lake is a long narrow lake located between Cosley Ridge and Whitecrow Mountain in the northeastern region of Glacier National Park. Mokowanis Lake is .50 miles (0.80 km) south of Glenns Lake.

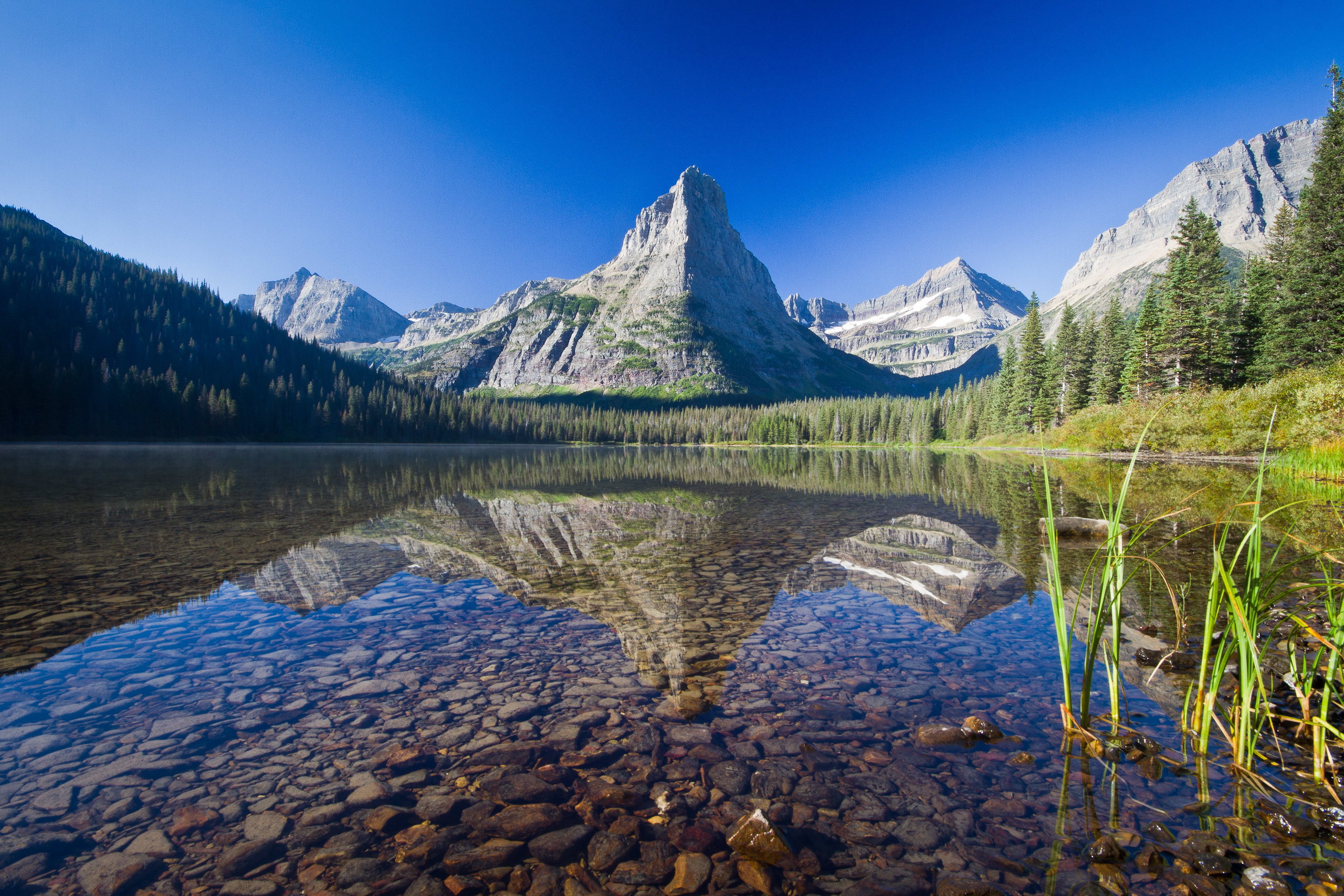
Glenns Lake and Pyramid Peak

== See also ==
- List of lakes in Glacier County, Montana
