= Ahern Peak =

Mountain in the state of Montana

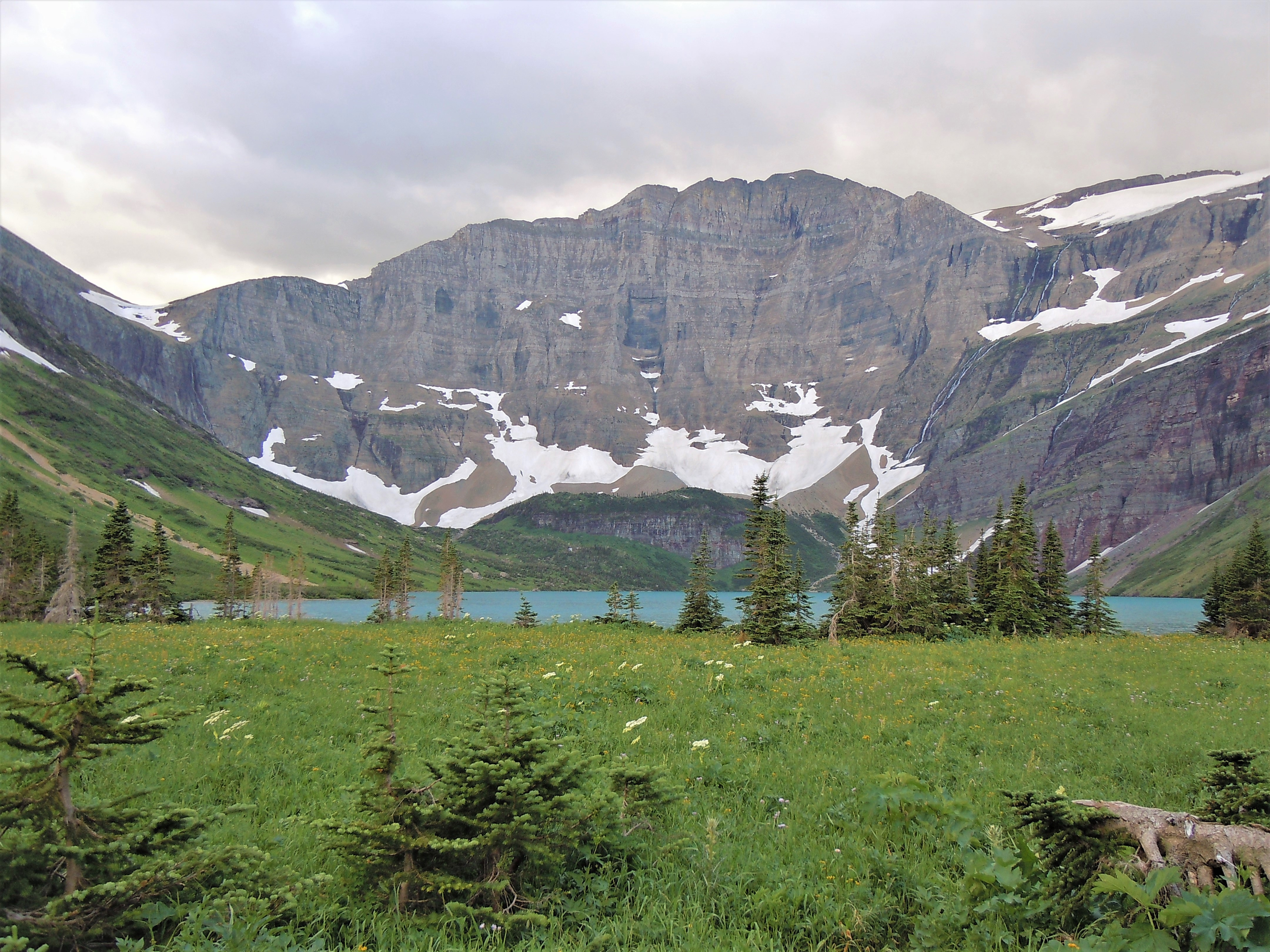
- East aspect, with Helen Lake

Highest point
- Elevation: 8,753 ft (2,668 m)
- Prominence: 349 ft (106 m)
- Coordinates: 48°49′51″N 113°46′56″W

Geography
- Location within Montana Location within the United States
- Location: Glacier County, Montana, U.S.
- Parent range: Lewis Range
- Topo map(s): USGS Ahern Pass, MT

Ahern Peak (8,753 feet (2,668 m)) is located in the Lewis Range, Glacier National Park in the U.S. state of Montana. The mountain was named after George Patrick Ahern. Ahern Peak is immediately southwest of Helen Lake and straddles the Continental Divide. Ahern Glacier lies just north of the peak.

== See also ==
- Mountains and mountain ranges of Glacier National Park (U.S.)
