= Ipasha Glacier =

Glacier in Montana, United States

- Location within Montana
- Type: Mountain glacier
- Location: Glacier National Park, Glacier County, Montana, U.S.
- Coordinates: 48°50′34″N 113°48′48″W
- Area: Approximately 52 acres (0.21 km^{2}) in 2005
- Length: .20 mi (0.32 km)
- Terminus: Barren rock
- Status: Retreating

Ipasha Glacier is located in the US state of Montana in Glacier National Park. The glacier is situated in a cirque to the southeast of Chaney Glacier and immediately east of the Continental Divide at an elevation between 8,000 feet (2,400 m) and 7,600 feet (2,300 m) above sea level. The glacier covers an area of approximately 52 acres (0.21 km^{2}) as measured in 2005, which is a third smaller than it was in 1966. Melt water from the glacier flows over Ipasha Falls en route to Ipasha Lake.

== See also ==
- List of glaciers in the United States
- Glaciers in Glacier National Park (U.S.)
