= Kaina Mountain =

Mountain in Montana, United States

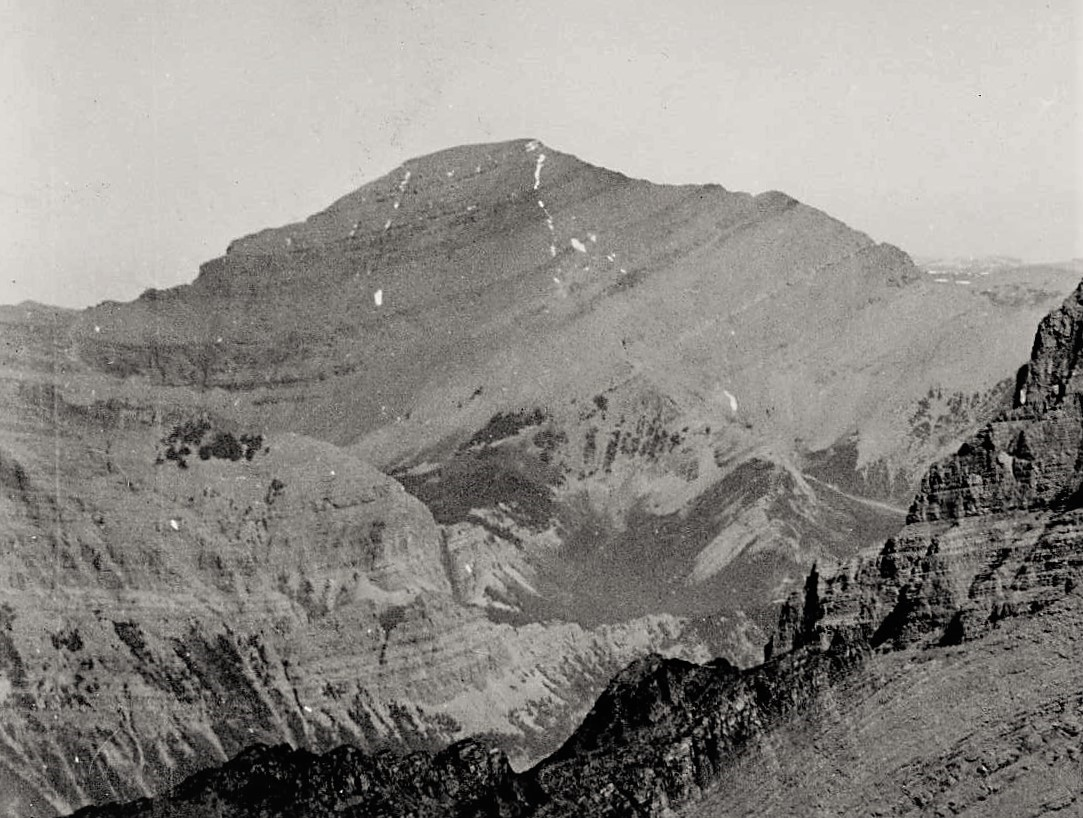
- Aerial view, south aspect. ca. 1925

Highest point
- Elevation: 9,494 ft (2,894 m)
- Prominence: 1,329 ft (405 m)
- Coordinates: 48°57′14″N 113°47′56″W

Geography
- Location within Montana Location within the United States
- Location: Glacier County, Montana, U.S.
- Parent range: Lewis Range
- Topo map: USGS Mount Cleveland MT

Climbing
- First ascent: Unknown
- Easiest route: class 3-4

Kaina Mountain (9,494 feet (2,894 m)) is located in the Lewis Range, Glacier National Park in the U.S. state of Montana. Kaina Mountain is in the northeastern section of Glacier National Park and north of Kaina Lake.

== Climate ==
Based on the Köppen climate classification, Kaina is located in an alpine subarctic climate zone with long, cold, snowy winters, and cool to warm summers. Winter temperatures can drop below −10 °F with wind chill factors below −30 °F.

== Geology ==
Like other mountains in Glacier National Park, Kaina is composed of sedimentary rock laid down during the Precambrian to Jurassic periods. Formed in shallow seas, this sedimentary rock was initially uplifted beginning 170 million years ago when the Lewis Overthrust fault pushed an enormous slab of precambrian rocks 3 mi (4.8 km) thick, 50 miles (80 km) wide and 160 miles (260 km) long over younger rock of the cretaceous period.

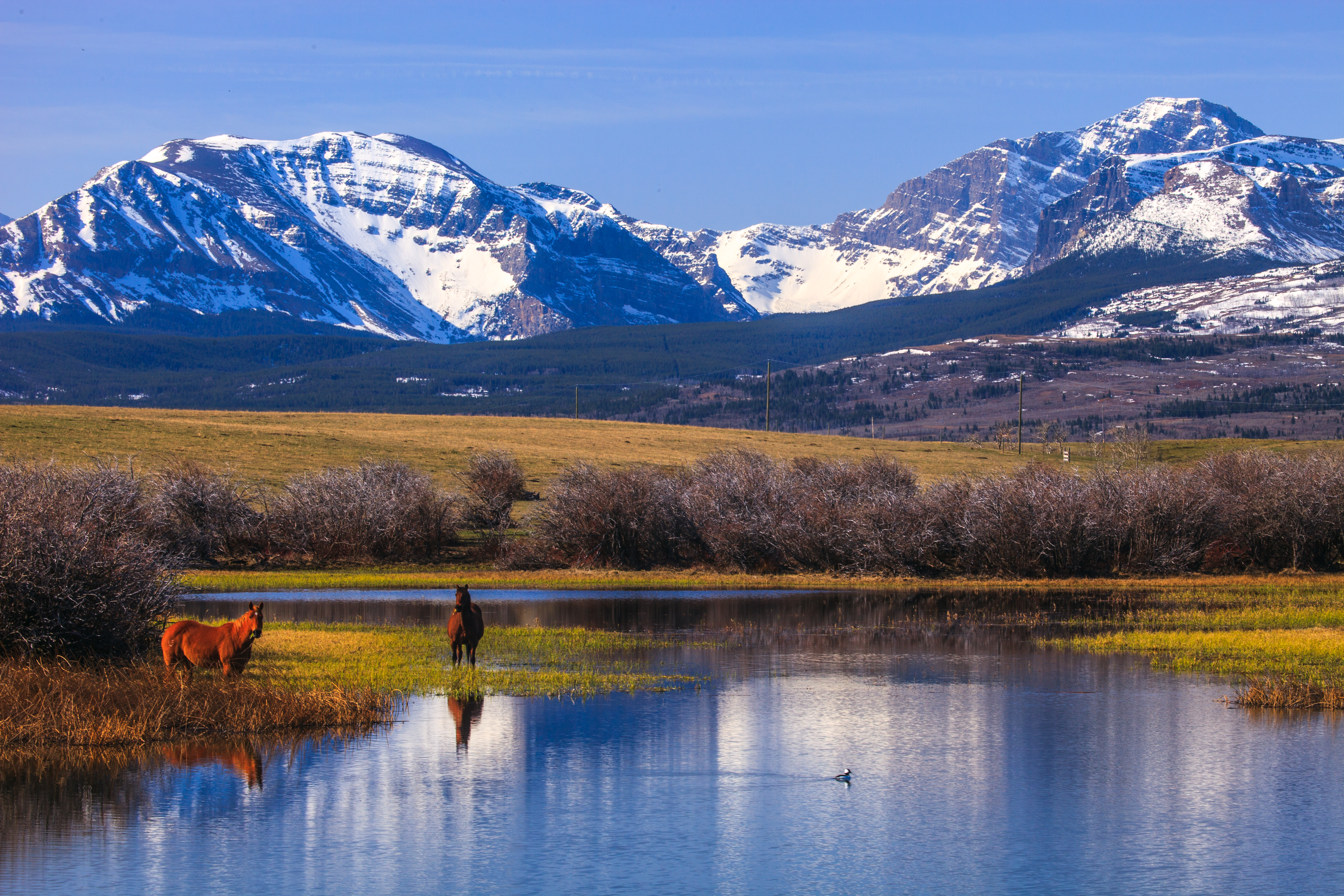
Sentinel Mountain (left) and Kaina Mountain upper right. From the northeast.

== See also ==
- Mountains and mountain ranges of Glacier National Park (U.S.)
