= Mokowanis Lake =

Lake in Glacier County, Montana, United States

- Location within Montana Location within the United States
- Location: Glacier National Park, Glacier County, Montana, US
- Coordinates: 48°52′45″N 113°48′53″W
- Type: Natural
- Primary inflows: Pyramid Creek
- Primary outflows: Pyramid Creek
- Basin countries: United States
- Max. length: .40 mi (0.64 km)
- Max. width: .15 mi (0.24 km)
- Surface elevation: 4,981 ft (1,518 m)

Mokowanis Lake is in Glacier National Park in the U. S. state of Montana, .80 miles (1.29 km) north of Margaret Lake and just northeast of Pyramid Peak. Glenns Lake lies less than .50 miles (0.80 km) north of Mokowanis Lake.

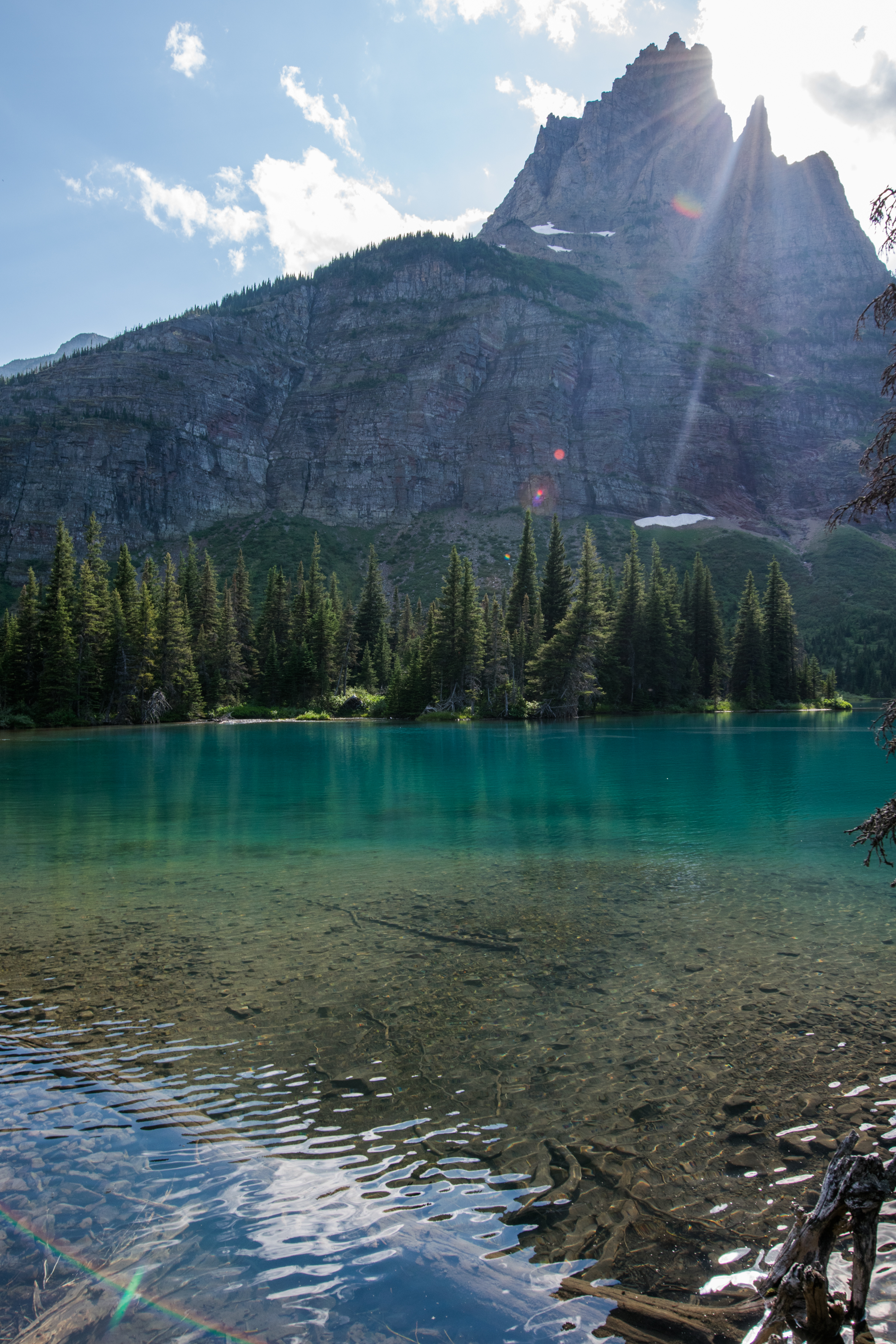
Mokowanis Lake and Pyramid Peak

== See also ==
- List of lakes in Glacier County, Montana

== Gallery ==
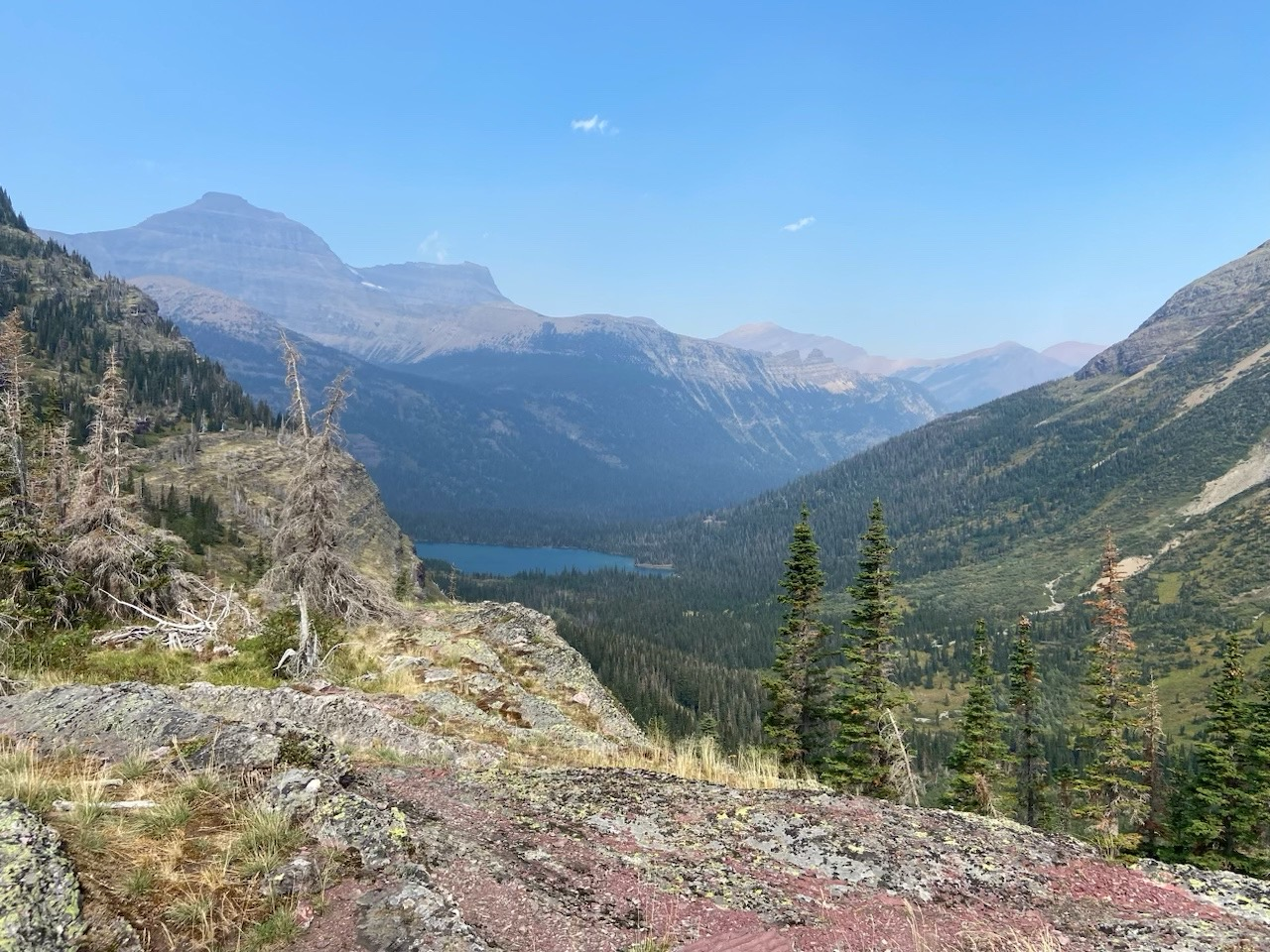
Mokowanis lake viewed from atop Pyramid Falls

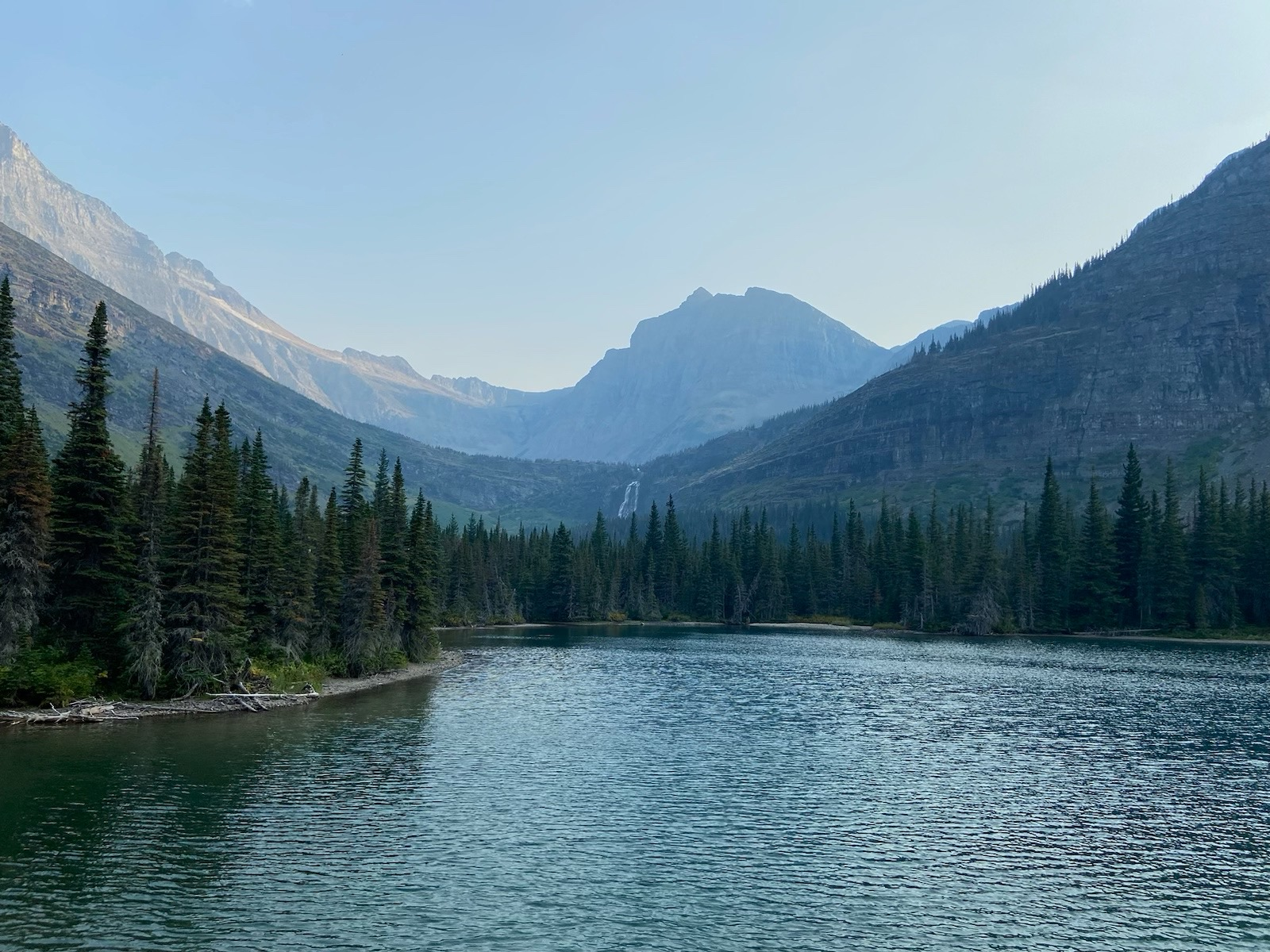
Mokowanis Lake with Pyramid Falls in the distance
