= Mount Merritt =

Mountain in Montana, United States

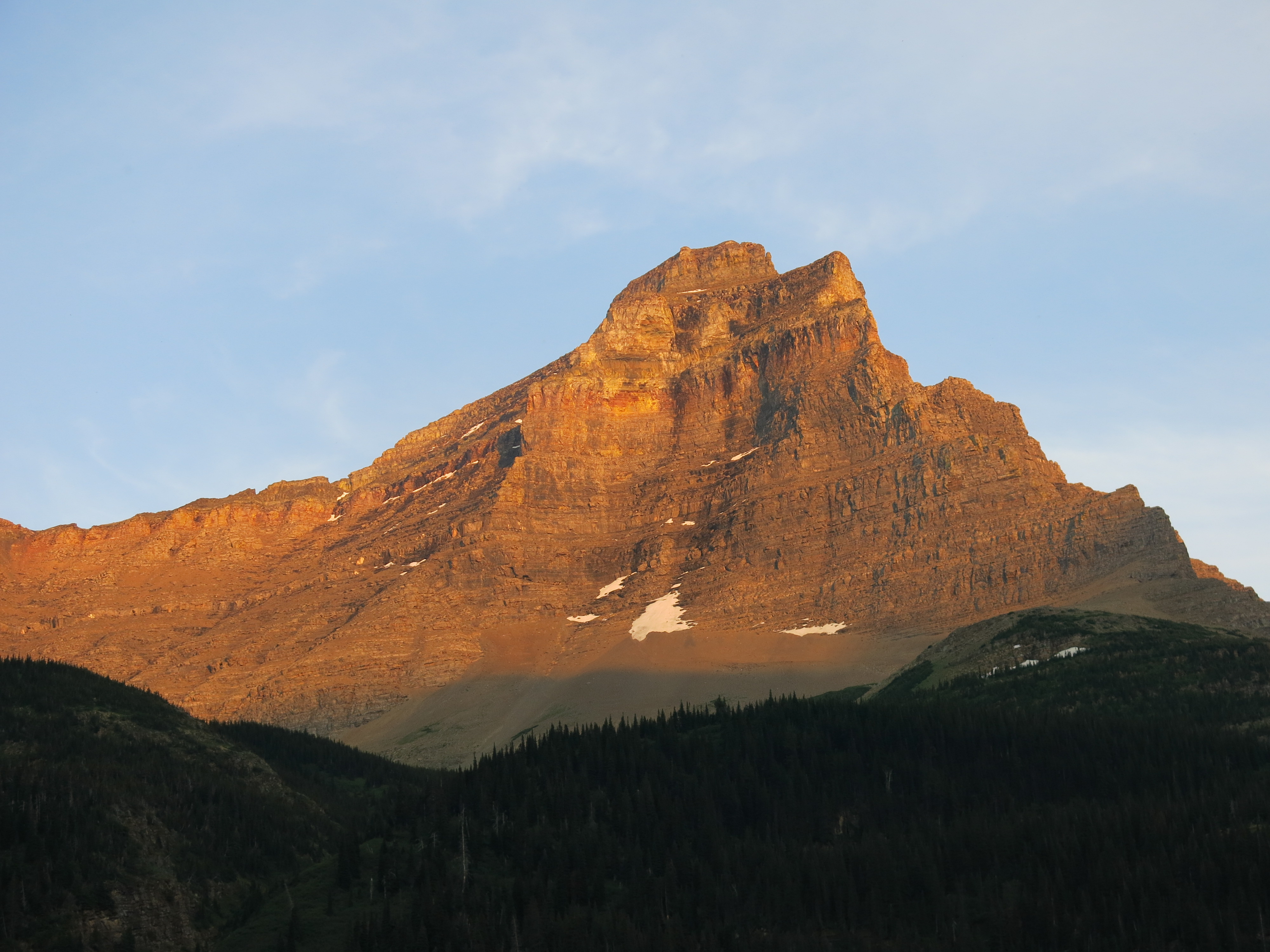
- Mount Merritt from Glenns Lake

Highest point
- Elevation: 10,009 ft (3,051 m)
- Prominence: 2,904 ft (885 m)
- Coordinates: 48°52′13″N 113°47′11″W

Geography
- Location within Montana Location within the United States
- Location: Glacier County, Montana, U.S.
- Parent range: Lewis Range
- Topo map(s): USGS Ahern Pass, MT

Climbing
- First ascent: 1924 (Norman Clyde)

Mount Merritt (10,009 feet (3,051 m)) is located in the Lewis Range, Glacier National Park in the U.S. state of Montana. The peak is one of six in Glacier National Park that rise over 10,000 feet (3,048 m). Located in the northeastern part of the park, Mount Merritt rises dramatically a vertical mile above nearby rivers. The approach to this remote peak involves a one way hike of 13 miles (21 km) to the summit base. Near the summit, the Old Sun Glacier hangs along the east ridge. The summit is named for General Wesley Merritt in 1891 by members of Troop C, 1st Cavalry who were visiting the region while stationed at Fort Assiniboine.

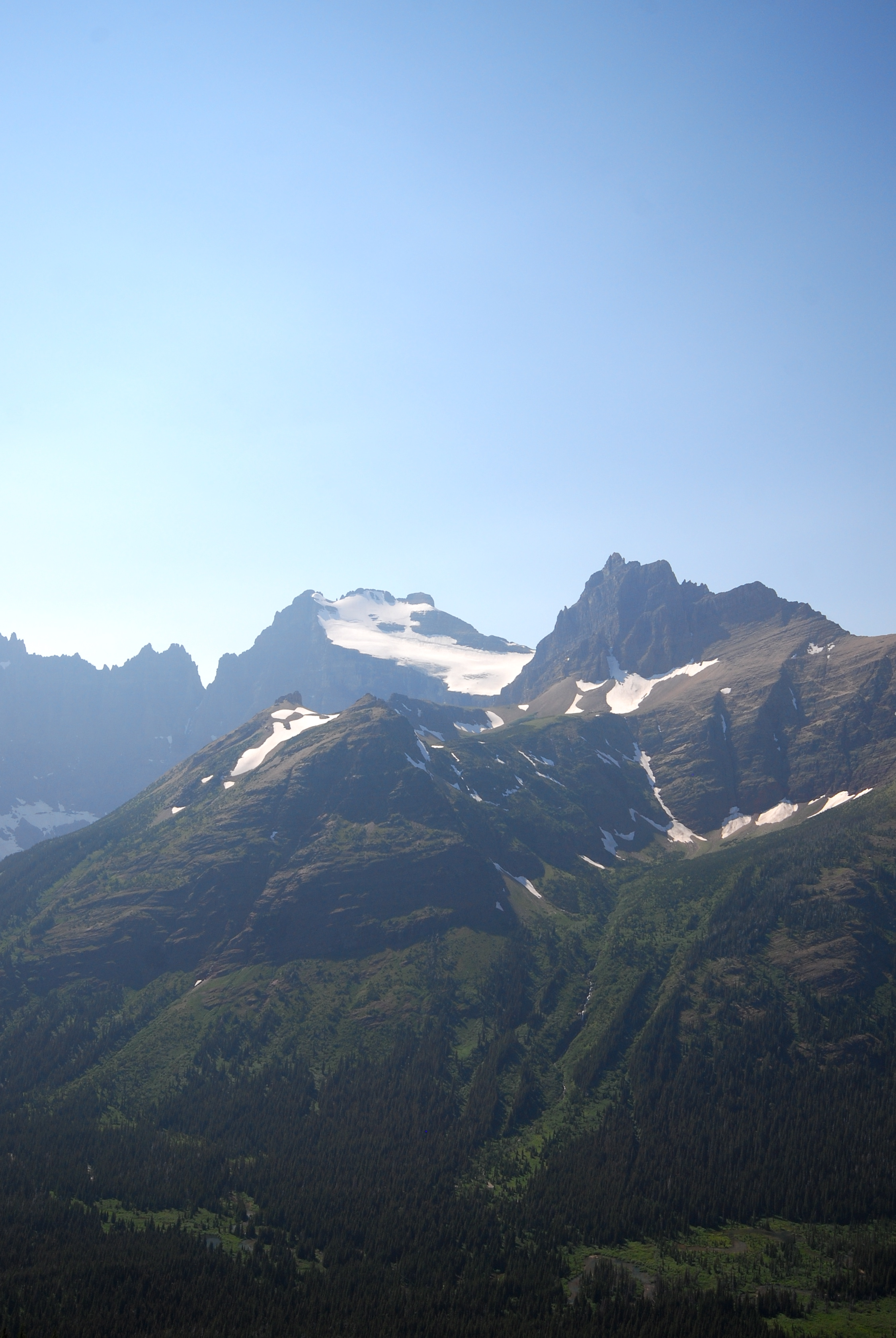
Mount Merritt as viewed from the Elizabeth Lake Trail. The large snowfield flanking the mountain's east face is Old Sun Glacier, and the sharp prominence to the right is known as Natoas Peak.

== See also ==
- Mountains and mountain ranges of Glacier National Park (U.S.)
