= Dusty Star Mountain =

Mountain in Glacier County, Montana, United States

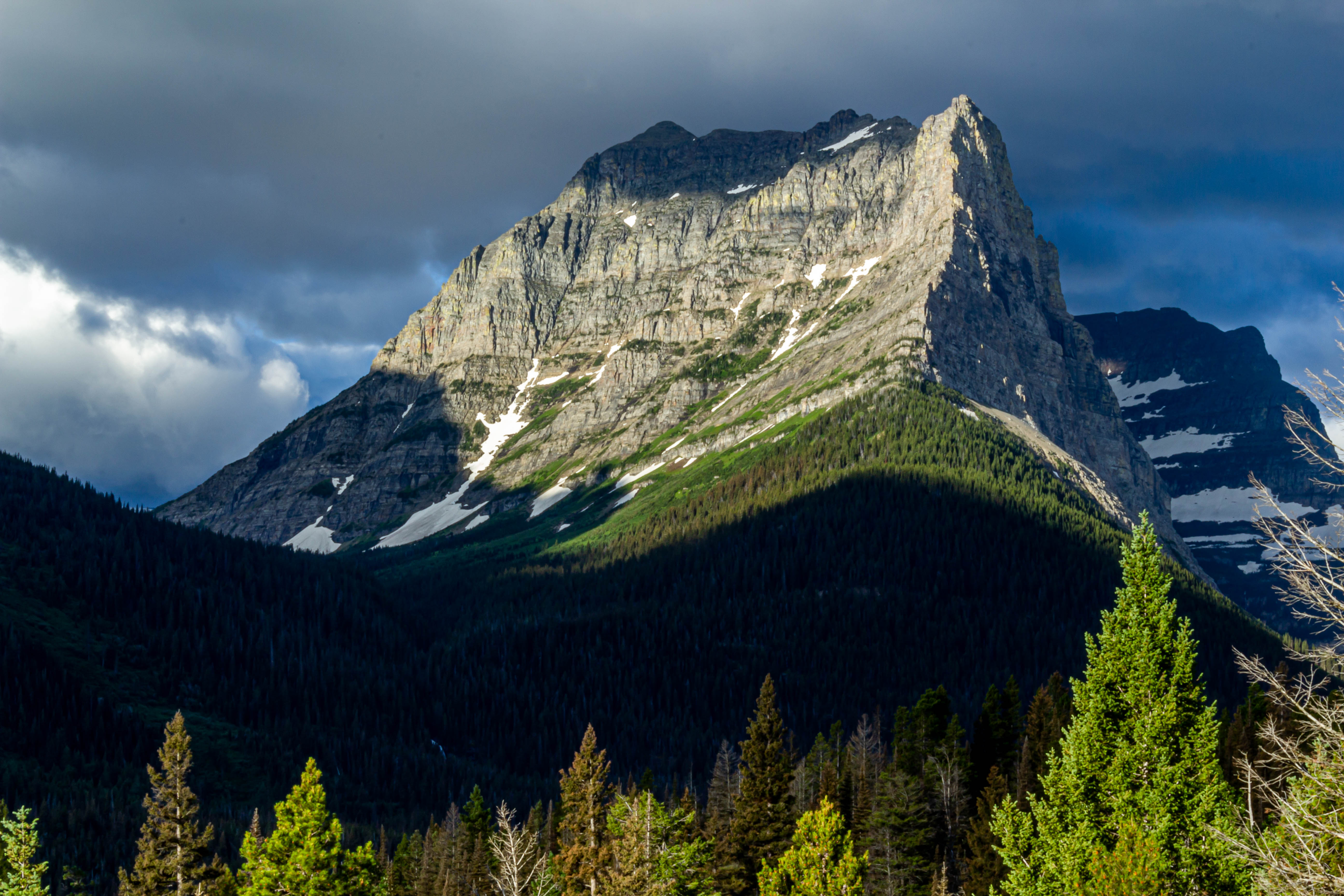

Highest point
- Elevation: 8,573 ft (2,613 m)
- Prominence: 573 ft (175 m)
- Coordinates: 48°39′01″N 113°33′07″W

Geography
- Location within Montana Location within the United States
- Location: Glacier County, Montana, U.S.
- Parent range: Lewis Range
- Topo map(s): USGS Logan Pass, MT

Dusty Star Mountain (8,573 feet [2,613 m]) is located in the Lewis Range, Glacier National Park in the U.S. state of Montana. Connected by an arête to Citadel Mountain to the south, Dusty Star Mountain lies to the south and across the Saint Mary Valley from Going-to-the-Sun Mountain. Dusty Star Mountain is easily seen from the Going-to-the-Sun Road, and often photographed by tourists taking pictures of Wild Goose Island which lies in the western section of Saint Mary Lake. The Blackfoot name for Dusty Star is iszika-kakatosi meaning "meteor" or "smoking star".

== Geology ==
Like other mountains in Glacier National Park, it is composed of sedimentary rock laid down during the Precambrian to Jurassic periods. Formed in shallow seas, this sedimentary rock was initially uplifted beginning 170 million years ago when the Lewis Overthrust fault pushed an enormous slab of precambrian rocks 3 mi (4.8 km) thick, 50 miles (80 km) wide and 160 miles (260 km) long over younger rock of the cretaceous period.

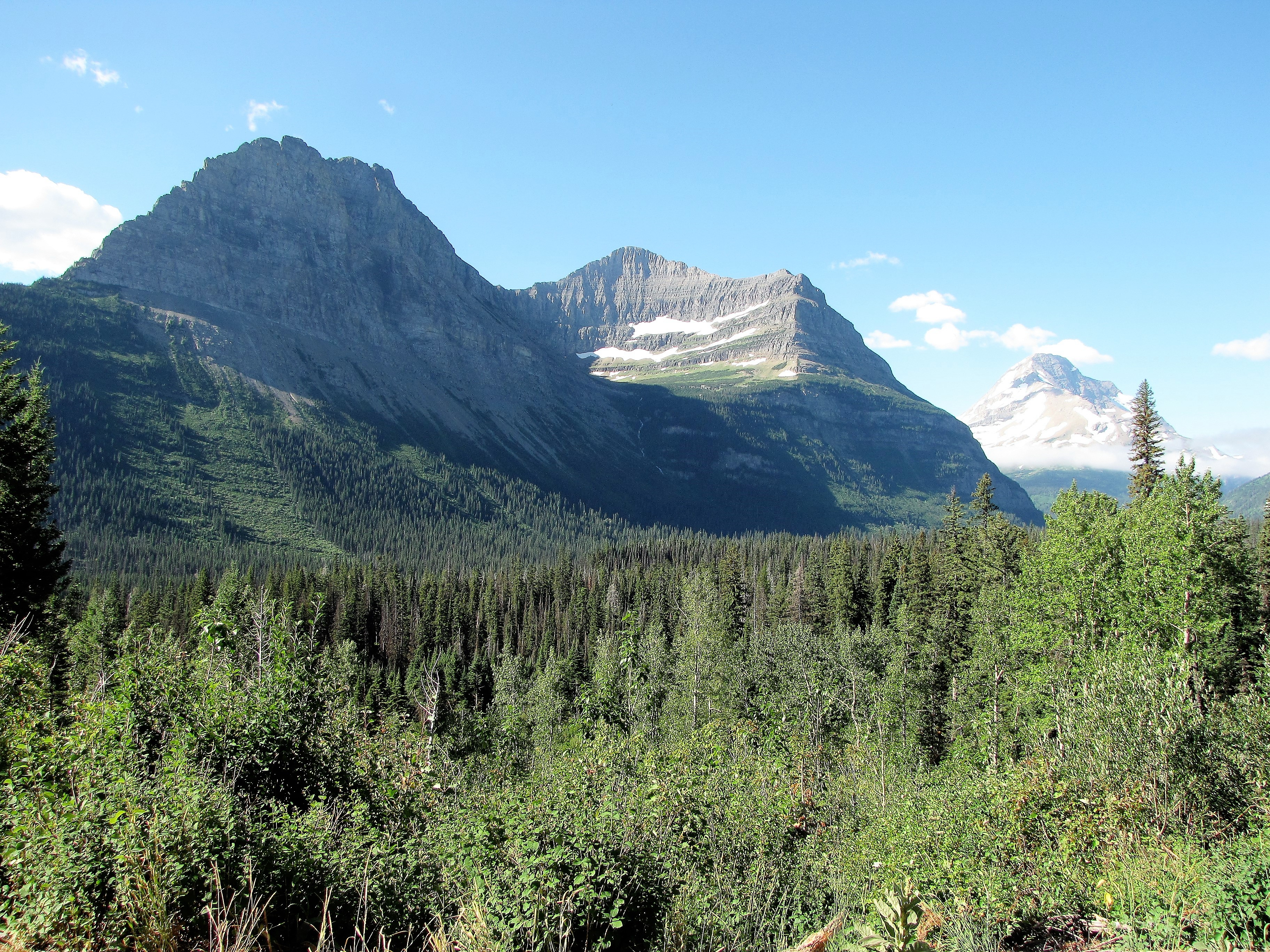
True north side of Dusty Star Mountain (left). Citadel Mountain (center).

== Climate ==
Based on the Köppen climate classification, it is located in an alpine subarctic climate zone with long, cold, snowy winters, and cool to warm summers. Winter temperatures can drop below −10 °F with wind chill factors below −30 °F.

== See also ==
- List of mountains and mountain ranges of Glacier National Park (U.S.)
