= Citadel Mountain =

Mountain in Montana, United States

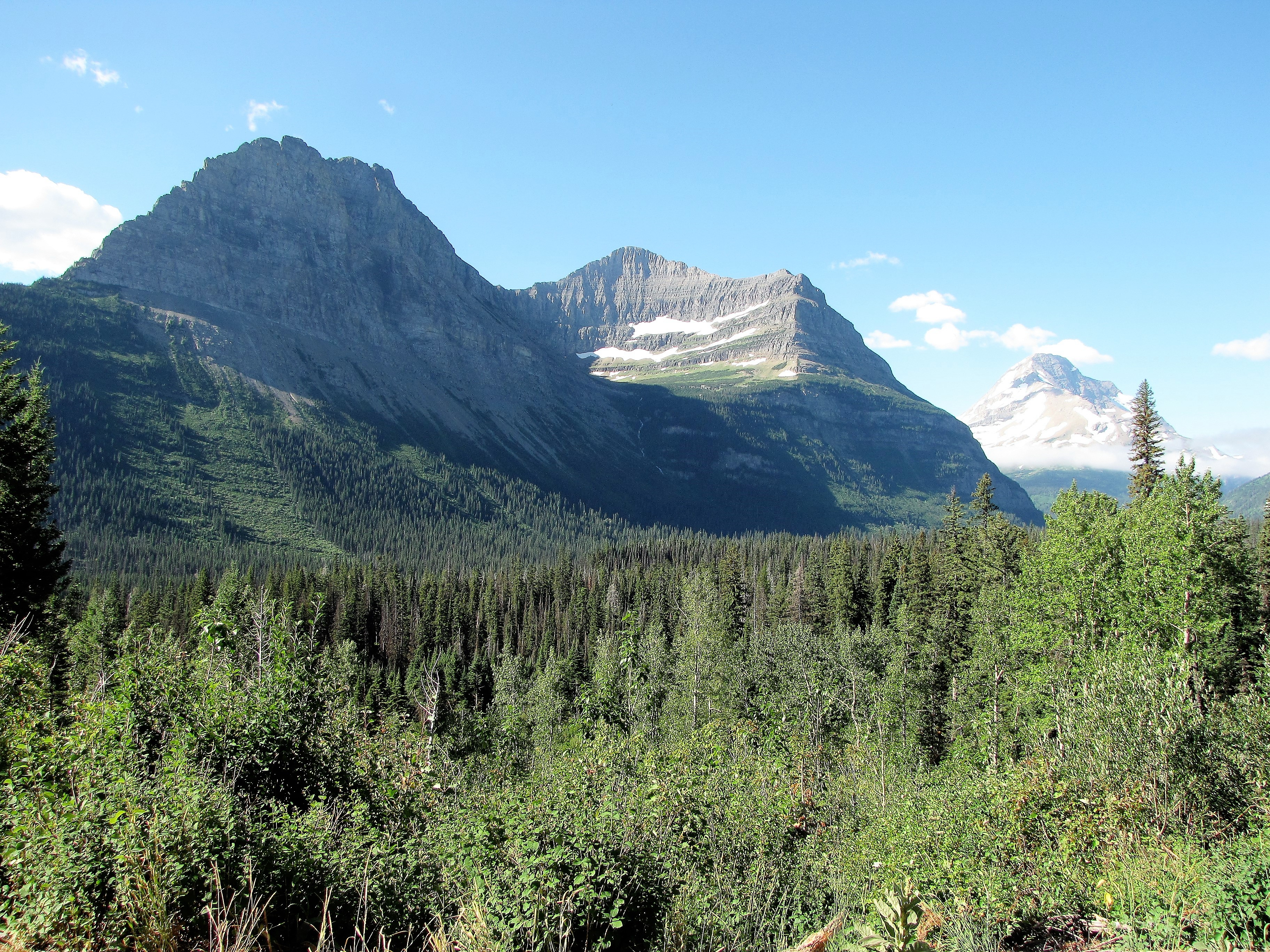
- Citadel Mountain in center with Dusty Star Mountain at left and Mount Jackson at right

Highest point
- Elevation: 9,035 ft (2,754 m) NAVD 88
- Prominence: 2,150 ft (660 m)
- Parent peak: Little Chief Mountain
- Coordinates: 48°37′56″N 113°39′18″W

Geography
- Location within Montana Location within the United States
- Location: Glacier County, Montana, U.S.
- Parent range: Lewis Range
- Topo map: USGS Logan Pass

Climbing
- First ascent: 1939 by Dyson, Iverson and Lindsey
- Easiest route: Strenuous hike, class 2

Citadel Mountain (9,035 feet or 2,754 meters) is located in the Lewis Range, Glacier National Park in the U.S. state of Montana. The mountain is located at the western edge of Saint Mary Lake and is easily seen from the Going-to-the-Sun Road.

== See also ==
- List of mountains and mountain ranges of Glacier National Park (U.S.)
