= Gem (disambiguation) =

A gem, or gemstone, is a cut rock or mineral.

Gem or GEM may also refer to:

== Arts, entertainment and media ==
=== Fictional characters ===
- Gem Reeves, in Neighbours
- Gem, in Star Trek's "The Empath"
- Gem, in Tron: Legacy
- Gem, in Power Rangers RPM
- Gems, aliens in Steven Universe
- Gems, in Land of the Lustrous

=== Music ===
- GEM (band), a Japanese idol girl group
- Gem (American band), with Doug Gillard
- Gem (Dutch band), a rock band
- G.E.M. (Gloria Tang Sze-wing, born 1991), a Chinese singer and songwriter
  - G.E.M. (EP), 2008
- Gem (album), by Beni Arashiro, 2007
- "The Gem", a song by Priestess from the 2009 album Prior to the Fire

=== Other uses in arts, entertainment and media ===
- "Gem", a 2006 episode of TV series The Inside
- The Gem, an early 20th-century British story paper
- CBC Gem, the OTT streaming service of Canadian Broadcasting Corporation
- Gem Theatre (disambiguation)
- Gem TV (disambiguation), the name of several broadcasters

== Businesses and organisations ==
- GEM Motoring Assist, a British road safety and breakdown recovery organisation
- G. E. M. Membership Department Stores, a chain of discount stores in the U.S. and Canada
- Global Electric Motorcars, an American manufacturer of low-speed vehicles
- GEM, musical instruments by Generalmusic
- Global Energy Monitor, an American organisation which catalogs energy-related projects
- Global Earthquake Model, a public–private partnership to develop risk assessment software
- Gordon–Evernham Motorsports, a NASCAR Busch Series race team
- Grenoble École de Management, a French graduate business school

== People ==
- Gem Archer (born 1966), English musician
- Harry Gem (1819–1881), English lawyer, soldier, writer and sportsman

== Places ==
=== United States ===
- Gem, Kansas
- Gem County, Idaho
- Gem, Indiana
- Gem, Ohio
- Gem, Texas
- Gem, West Virginia
- Gem Glacier, Glacier National Park, Montana
- Gem Valley, Idaho
- Gem Lake (Flathead County, Montana)
- Lake Gem (Florida)

=== Elsewhere ===
- Gem, Alberta, Canada
- Gem Lake (Vancouver Island), British Columbia, Canada
- Gem Constituency, Kenya

== Science and technology ==
- GEM (gene), GTP-binding protein
- Gem, a format of the RubyGems package manager for Ruby
- Gem, codename for the PlayStation Move controller
- Gem, the game engine of Best Way
- GEM of Egypt, a power shovel used for strip mining
- Geminal, in chemistry
- Gemini (constellation), in astronomy
- Gas electron multiplier, a type of gaseous ionization detector
- German equatorial mount, for astronomical telescopes and cameras
- GEM (desktop environment) (Graphics Environment Manager), a software operating environment from Digital Research
- GEM, a compiler backend created for DEC MICA and later used in OpenVMS and Tru64.
- Graphics Environment for Multimedia, graphics software
- Global Environmental Multiscale Model, a meteorological forecasting system
- Globally Executable MHP, a DVB specification for TV
- Graphics Execution Manager, video software
- Graphite-Epoxy Motor, a series of solid rocket boosters
- Gravitoelectromagnetism, formal analogies between the equations for electromagnetism and relativistic gravitation
- Gyrokinetic ElectroMagnetic, a plasma turbulence simulation
- SECS/GEM, semiconductor's equipment interface protocol for equipment-to-host data communications

== Transportation and military ==
- Gem (automobile), by the Gem Motor Car Company 1917–1919
- Rolls-Royce Gem, a helicopter engine
- Gem 4/4, a Rhaetian Railway locomotive class
- Ground effect machine (GEM), a hovercraft
- USS Gem (SP-41), a U.S. Navy patrol vessel 1917-1919
- GM GEM platform, Global Emerging Markets automotive platform used by General Motors

== Other uses ==
- Gem (moth), of the family Geometridae
- Gem, the most common paper clip design
- Gender Empowerment Measure, an index designed to measure of gender equality
- Generalized Expertise Measure, a psychometric measure of expertise
- The Germanic languages (ISO 639-1 code gem)
- Global Entrepreneurship Monitor, a research project into entrepreneurial activity
- Grand Egyptian Museum, or the Giza Museum, a museum of artifacts of ancient Egypt
- Growth Enterprise Market, a board of the Stock Exchange of Hong Kong

== See also ==
- Gems (disambiguation)
- Gemstone (disambiguation)
- Jem (disambiguation)
