= Gem TV =

Gem TV or Gems TV may refer to:

- GEM TV, a Turkey-based group of Persian-language satellite television channels
- GEM TV, former name of DZCE-TV a.k.a. INC TV, a Philippine TV station
- Gem (Southeast Asian TV channel), a defunct Southeast Asian television channel
- GEM TV, former name of Christian Era Broadcasting Service International from 2005 to 2012
- Gems TV, a jewellery shopping network headquartered in Thailand, first launched in the UK and expanded to other countries
  - Gems TV (UK), launched 2004
  - Gems TV Extra, UK, on air 2011–2012
  - Gems TV (USA), on air 2006–2010
  - Gems TV (German TV channel), on air October–December 2012
- 9Gem, an Australian television channel formerly named GEM
- GEMS Television, former name of Universo (TV channel) from 1993 to 2001

== See also ==
- Gem (disambiguation)
- Gems (TV series), a British soap opera on air 1985–1988
