= Gems (disambiguation) =

Gems, or gemstones, are polished, cut stones or minerals.

Gems or GEMS may also refer to:

== Arts, entertainment and media ==
- Gems (Aerosmith album), 1988
- Gems (Patti LaBelle album), 1994
- Gems: The Duets Collection, a 2011 Michael Bolton album
- Gems TV, a jewellery manufacturer and TV shopping network headquartered in Chanthaburi, Thailand
  - Gems TV (German TV channel)
  - Gems TV (UK)
  - Gems TV (USA)
- Gems (TV series), a British soap opera, 1985–1988
- Gems & Gemology, a quarterly scientific journal

== Businesses and organisations ==
- GEMS Education, an international education company
- GEMS Girls' Clubs, a Christian organization
- Girls Educational and Mentoring Services, a non-profit organization
- Geostationary Environment Monitoring Spectrometer (GEMS), satellite mission of National Institute of Environmental Research (NIER) of Korea

== People ==
- David Gems (born 1960), British geneticist and biogerontologist
- Jonathan Gems (born 1952), British playwright and screenwriter

== Science and technology ==
- GEMS, software from Conning
- Glycolipid-enriched membrane, in biology
- Generic Eclipse Modeling System, software development tool
- Geneva Emotional Music Scale, a rating scale for measuring emotion elicited by music
- Geophysical Monitoring Station, former name of InSight, a Mars lander mission
- Global Election Management System, software by Premier Election Solutions
- Gravity and Extreme Magnetism Small Explorer, a NASA project
- GeMS, a system at the Gemini Observatory
- RubyGems, a package manager for the Ruby programming language
- Geostationary Environment Monitoring Spectrometer (GEMS), a South Korean geostationary atmospheric monitoring satellite instrument (mission)

== Other uses ==
- Australia women's national under-19 basketball team, nicknamed the Gems

== See also ==
- Sonic Gems Collection, a 2005 compilation of video games
- Gem (disambiguation)
