= Gems TV =

Thai television shopping channel

- Headquarters: Redditch, United Kingdom

Ownership
- Owner: Gems TV Holdings Limited

History
- Launched: 8 October 2004 (UK); 1 October 2006 (Germany); 29 November 2006 (USA); 11 November 2007 (Japan) ? (China)
- Closed: 15 April 2010 (USA)

Gems TV was a jewellery manufacturer and reverse auction TV shopping network headquartered in Chanthaburi, Thailand. It began its operations in October 2004 in the UK, and then expanded to Germany, America, Japan and China. Gems TV was formed from the merger of Thaigem Limited and Eagle Road Studios, which formed Gems TV UK Limited, which eventually became a subsidiary of Gems TV Holdings Limited when the company expended to other countries.

For the fiscal year ending 30 June 2009, revenues amounted to $162.16 million, down 31% from the previous year, with a gross profit of $53 million.

Since the closure of Gems TV USA and the sale of Gems TV (UK) and Gems London (Gems TV Japan) in 2010, the company no longer focuses on jewellery production and the sales through their own shopping channels.

== History ==
Gems TV began in October 2004, in the UK from the joint venture of Eagle Road Studios and Thaigem. The partnership came about from Thaigem initially stocking Eagle Road Studios' channel Snatch It! and after the success of the jewellery on the channel, one of Eagle Road's other channels Factory Outlet was replaced with 'Gems.tv'. Eagle Road Studios ran the channel alongside 'Deal Of The Day' and 'Snatch It!'.

Gems TV company logo used from 12 May 2005 to 18 January 2008.

In April 2005, Eagle Road Studios announced that 'Snatch It!' was to close down and was to be replaced with a second jewellery channel, focusing solely on Sterling Silver after a successful trial run on the channel. During the closing down process of Snatch It!, the new channel was being named 'Gems TV Silver'. However, when the 2nd channel officially launched on 12 May 2005, Gems TV was rebranded as Gems TV Gold and received a completely new identity and studio. The 2nd channel was simply known as 'Gems TV'. Both channels ran alongside 'Deal Of The Day' at the same time was replaced with mobile phone shopping channel; 'MyPhone.tv'. In June 2005, it was announced that both Thaigem and Eagle Road Studios had merged to form 'Gems TV UK Limited' and as a result, on the 19 July 2005, the 'MyPhone.tv channel was sold off to Canis Media Group.

Gems TV Holdings was listed on the Singapore Stock Exchange in November 2006 and at this time Gems TV employed over 2200 people worldwide dropping to around 1,100 people worldwide by 2010.

== Jewellery production ==
Gems TV owns its gem production facilities are in Chanthaburi, Thailand. The Gems TV company (now also known by the parent company name of TGGC Limited, or Gemporia) buys cut and polished gems, crafts its products, and then sell them through its various television channels; hence the motto, '[C]utting out the middlemen', and its claim that they can consistently undercut high street prices.

The company claims to sell the world's widest variety of gems, including rarities such as Block D Tanzanite. The channel utilizes a falling price - or 'reverse' - auction game.

== Sale of Gems TV (UK) Limited ==
On 18 June 2010, Gems TV Holdings sold Gems TV (UK) Limited (a wholly owned subsidiary) to The Colourful Company Group Limited, which is the company that owns and runs rival channel Rocks TV, Gem Collector and Jewellery Maker.

As a result of the sale, this has now brought Gems TV (UK) Limited back under the ownership of Steve Bennett, who was one of the original founders of the company back in 2004.

== See also ==
- Gems TV (UK)
- Gems TV (USA)
- Gems TV (Germany)
- Juwelo TV (on German Wikipedia)
