= GEMM =

GEMM may refer to:

- General matrix multiply gemm, one of the Basic Linear Algebra Subprograms
- Genetically engineered mouse model
- Gilt-edged market maker
- Global Electronic Music Marketplace, a former online music market
- CFU-GEMM, granulocyte-erythrocyte-monocyte-megakaryocyte colony forming unit

== See also ==
- Gem (disambiguation)
