= Gem Collector =

British website and former television channel

- Country: United Kingdom
- Headquarters: Warwickshire

Programming
- Picture format: 576i (16:9, SDTV)

Ownership
- Owner: The Genuine Gemstone Company
- Sister channels: Gems TV; Gems TV Extra; Jewellery Maker

History
- Launched: 8 October 2010
- Replaced: Gems TV 2 (On Sky)
- Replaced by: Gems TV Extra

Links
- Website: www.gemcollector.com

Gem Collector is an eCommerce website. Previously it was a British reverse auction loose gemstone shopping channel. It is the first channel of its kind in the UK. The channel was available on Sky and online. The channel operations are based at Eagle Road Studios in Redditch, near Birmingham. The channel broadcast live between 19:00 and midnight daily.

== Pre-launch ==
Gem Collector began beta testing on 8 October 2010; on the same day Gems TV celebrated its 6th birthday. The channel has replaced the former Gems TV 2 EPG slot on Sky. The channel was using the former Gems TV 2/Rocks TV studio, which was also at the time being used by sister channel Jewellery Maker.

The channel officially launched at 19:00 on Monday 11 October 2010.

== Closure ==
On 13 December 2010, it was announced on Barry Kirley's official Facebook page that Gem Collector as a stand-alone channel would cease broadcasting by the end of December and would continue from January 2011 as a programming strand within Rocks TV, which in itself rebranded as Gems TV Extra on 1 January 2011 and moved from 647 to 656.

== Programme block ==
Gemcollector is now broadcast on its website only.
