= Lake Gem =

Lake Gem may refer to:

- Lake Gem (Florida)
- Lake Gem (New Zealand)
