= Where Did You Go =

Where Did You Go may refer to:

- "Where Did You Go?", a song by Jax Jones and MNEK released in 2022
- "Where Did You Go" (Kiana song), a song by Kiana released in 2023
- "Where Did U Go", a song by G.E.M. released in 2008
- "Where Did You Go", a song by Boyzone from the album Where We Belong
- "Where Did You Go?", a song by the Doubleclicks from the album Dimetrodon
- "Where Did You Go?", a song by the Four Tops from the 1965 album Four Tops
