= Gemstone (disambiguation) =

A gemstone is a piece of mineral crystal or rock used to make jewelry or other adornments.

Gemstone or gemstones may also refer to:

- Gemstone (database), or GemStone/S, commercial software by GemStone Systems
- GemStone IV, GemStone III and GemStone II, multiplayer online role-playing video games
- Gemstone Publishing, an American company
- Gemstones (album) by Adam Green, 2005
- Gemstones (rapper) (Demarco Lamonte Castle, born 1981)
- Operation Gemstone, a planned series of clandestine acts leading to the Watergate burglary

== See also ==
- Gem (disambiguation)
- Gems (disambiguation)
