= Channel 21 (Germany) =

German shopping television network

- Country: Germany
- Broadcast area: Germany
- Headquarters: Hanover, Germany

Programming
- Language: German
- Picture format: 576i (16:9 SDTV); 1080i (HDTV)

Ownership
- Owner: Channel21 Holding AG
- Sister channels: Gems TV

History
- Launched: 1 March 2001
- Closed: 31 May 2026
- Former names: RTL Shop (2001-2008)

Links
- Website: www.channel21.de

Availability

Streaming media
- channel21.de: Watch live

Channel 21, originally launched as RTL Shop, was a German cable and satellite teleshopping channel based in Hanover. The channel was launched as part of Europe's largest media company RTL Group (itself ultimately owned by Bertelsmann) and is rebroadcast on more than 20 German-language stations. Channel 21 was launched as RTL Shop on 1 March 2001. Its main competitors were HSE24 (Home Shopping Europe) and QVC.

== History ==
Until September 2006, RTL Shop was produced at the Coloneum in Cologne. In the summer of 2006, a new broadcast center with administration and studios was built in Hanover, which was ready for broadcasts on 1 October 2006. Cologne Broadcasting Center (CBC), an RTL Group subsidiary, was responsible for building and operating the broadcast center.

RTL Shop was part of RTL's diversification strategy, aiming to diversify its sources of revenue away from traditional advertising revenue.

On 19 February 2008 it was announced that RTL would sell RTL Shop in the first half of 2008. Since broadcasting in 2001, the station had made losses every year despite relocating from Cologne to Hanover and restructuring. In the course of this, Walter Freiwald left the teleshopping channel in April 2008. The channel was bought by Aurelius AG, a group of investors based in Munich. The goal was to achieve profitability.

Starting on 1 January 2009, RTL Shop changed its name in two stages. Initially, it changed its name to "Channel 21 SHOP".Channel 21 became its official name on 1 March 2009.

From the second half of 2009 until 30 September 2012, the channel also broadcast a spin-off channel called Channel 21 Express.

On 1 January 2010, Michael Oplesch, the former managing director of the TV channel VIVA Germany, bought an initial tranche of shares in Channel 21 from Aurelius AG, using his investment vehicle with his Centuere AG. On 16 February 2010, the sale of remaining shares in Channel 21 to Centuere AG was announced. The sale was finalized on 1 March 2010 and Michael Oplesch took over the management of the company. On 30 May 2010, it was announced that the founder of and former managing director of EM.TV, Thomas Haffa had purchased Centuere AG's interests in the channel at the end of April and transferred them to Channel 21 Holding, which has operated the channels Channel 21 and Channel 21 Express since. On 10 December 2010, it became known that Channel 21 was at risk of bankruptcy. A large proportion of the employees were dismissed in December.

Channel 21, as reported by media news site DWDL.de in May 2012, planned to restructure, aiming to make the company economically viable. It was decided to fire almost the entire workforce as of 31 August 2012. As of September 2012, the station had only 15 employees. The restructuring took place as a result of the critical financial year in which Channel 21 lost many of its suppliers, including Wollpfannen, a cookware manufacturer, which was one of the few major suppliers of the shopping channel and now supplies QVC, a competitor.

Channel 21 sold goods under the "Maxx" brand and did not sell any more broadly known brands.

Channel 21 had been broadcasting in 16:9 format from 31 October 2012 until its closure on 31 May 2026. On-air design and studio were changed at the same time.

Broadcasting in HDTV started via Astra 1L on 30 January 2016. The resolution was 1440x1080.

On 23 March 2026, the Hanover District Court ordered provisional insolvency administration.

On 27 May 2026, it was announced that the station would cease broadcasting at the end of the month, on 31 May 2026.

The last live product presentation concluded with the sale of the remaining stock on 31 May 2026, at 4:43 p.m. Until 5:00 p.m., a small group of presenters and team members were given the opportunity to speak briefly, expressing their deep connection to the station and the team. At 6:00 p.m., the approximately one-hour live farewell broadcast began, during which the entire team gathered in the studio and bid farewell to the audience with emotional moments and conversations.

== Notable presenters ==
- Allegra Curtis
- Jenny Elvers (–2009)
- Anja Kruse (–2008)
- Désirée Nick
- Natascha Ochsenknecht
- Max Schradin (2012–2014)
