= Grinnell Glacier =

Glacier in Glacier National Park, Montana, United States

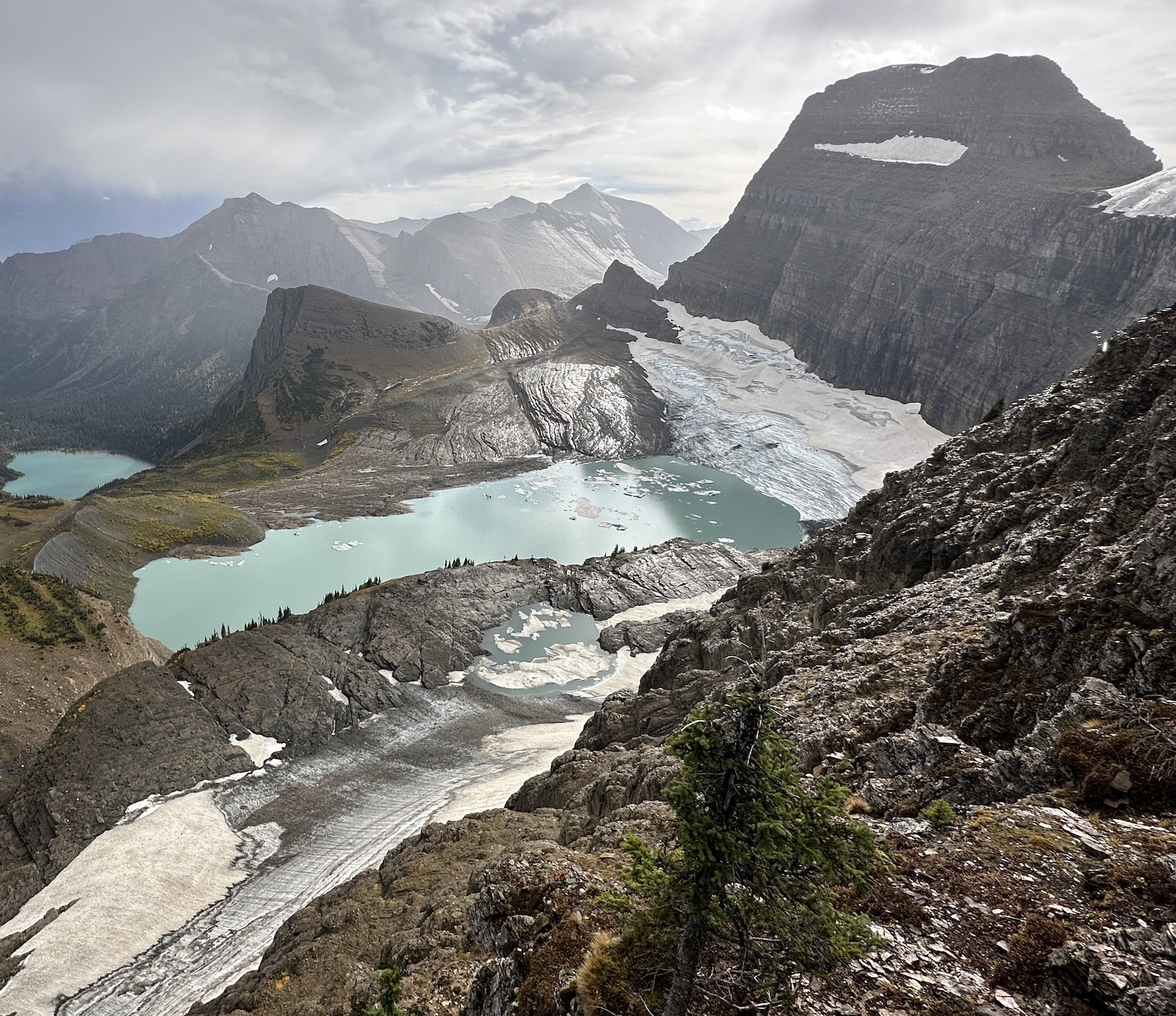
- Grinnell Glacier at center right (2022)

- Location within Montana
- Type: Mountain Glacier
- Location: Glacier National Park, Glacier County, Montana, U.S.
- Coordinates: 48°45′06″N 113°43′39″W
- Area: 152 acres (0.62 km^{2}) in 2005
- Terminus: Proglacial lake
- Status: Retreating

Grinnell Glacier is in the heart of Glacier National Park in the U.S. state of Montana. The glacier is named for George Bird Grinnell, an early American conservationist and explorer, who was also a strong advocate of ensuring the creation of Glacier National Park. The glacier is in the Lewis Range and rests on the north flank of Mount Gould at an altitude averaging 7,000 feet (2,100 m), in the Many Glacier region of the park.

The glacier has been one of the most photographed glaciers in the park and many of these photographs date back to the mid 19th century during the late Little Ice Age. When compared with images taken over subsequent years, the glacier has obviously retreated substantially. In 1850, Grinnell Glacier measured 710 acres (2.9 km^{2}), including the area of Salamander Glacier, an ice apron or shelf glacier that used to be attached to Grinnell, but is now separate. By 1993, Grinnell Glacier measured 220 acres (0.89 km^{2}) and The Salamander measured 57 acres (0.23 km^{2}).

Between 1966 and 2005, Grinnell Glacier lost almost 40 percent of its acreage. Glaciologists have predicted that if carbon dioxide levels increase at a worst-case scenario, all the glaciers in the park, including Grinnell, will disappear by the year 2030. However, under a modest increase in overall carbon dioxide levels, some glaciers will remain until the year 2277.

Gem Glacier, one of the smallest remaining glaciers in the park, is located on the Garden Wall above Grinnell. Repeat photography taken between 1938 and 2009 (as shown below) show that Grinnell Glacier has retreated significantly over that period. The Salamander and Gem Glaciers have shown little change in area over the same period of time. The Salamander receives its name for its shape and its coloring, which comes from the serratia bacteria that grows on it.

The glacier can be reached after a 6-mile (9.7 km) hike from a trailhead beginning at Swiftcurrent Lake. The trail has an altitude gain of just over 1,600 ft (490 m), with the majority of that in the second half of the hike.

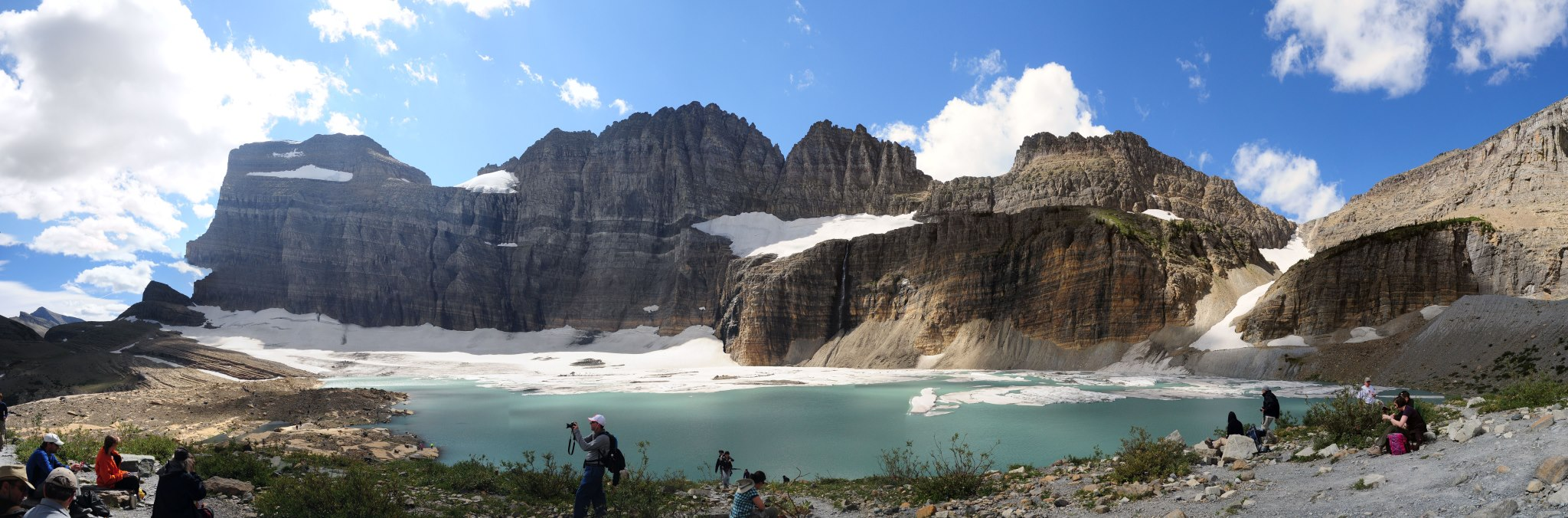
A view of the Grinnell Glacier after hiking the trail leading to it, in 2012

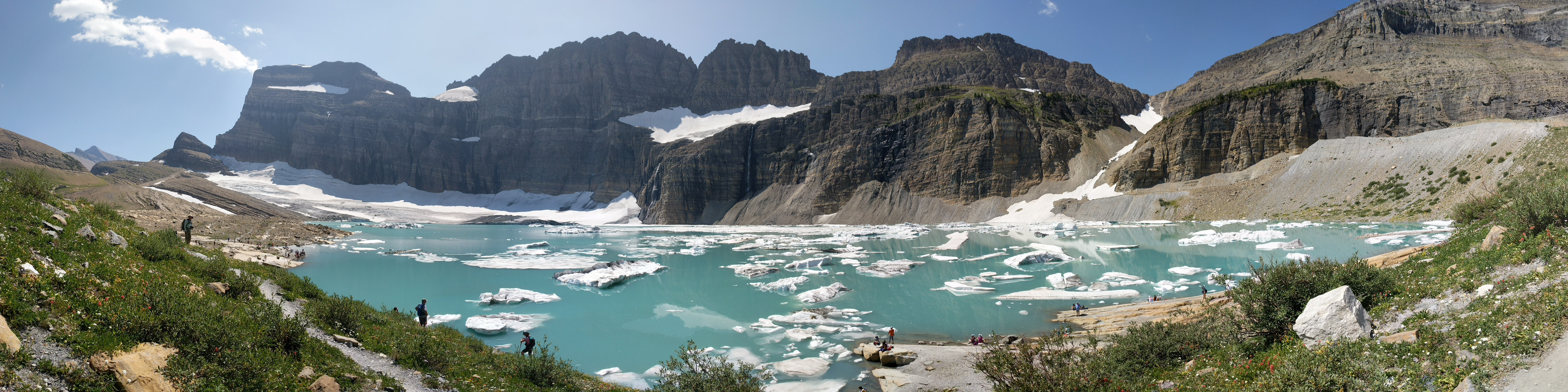
A view of Grinnell Glacier from the end of the hiking trail in August 2019

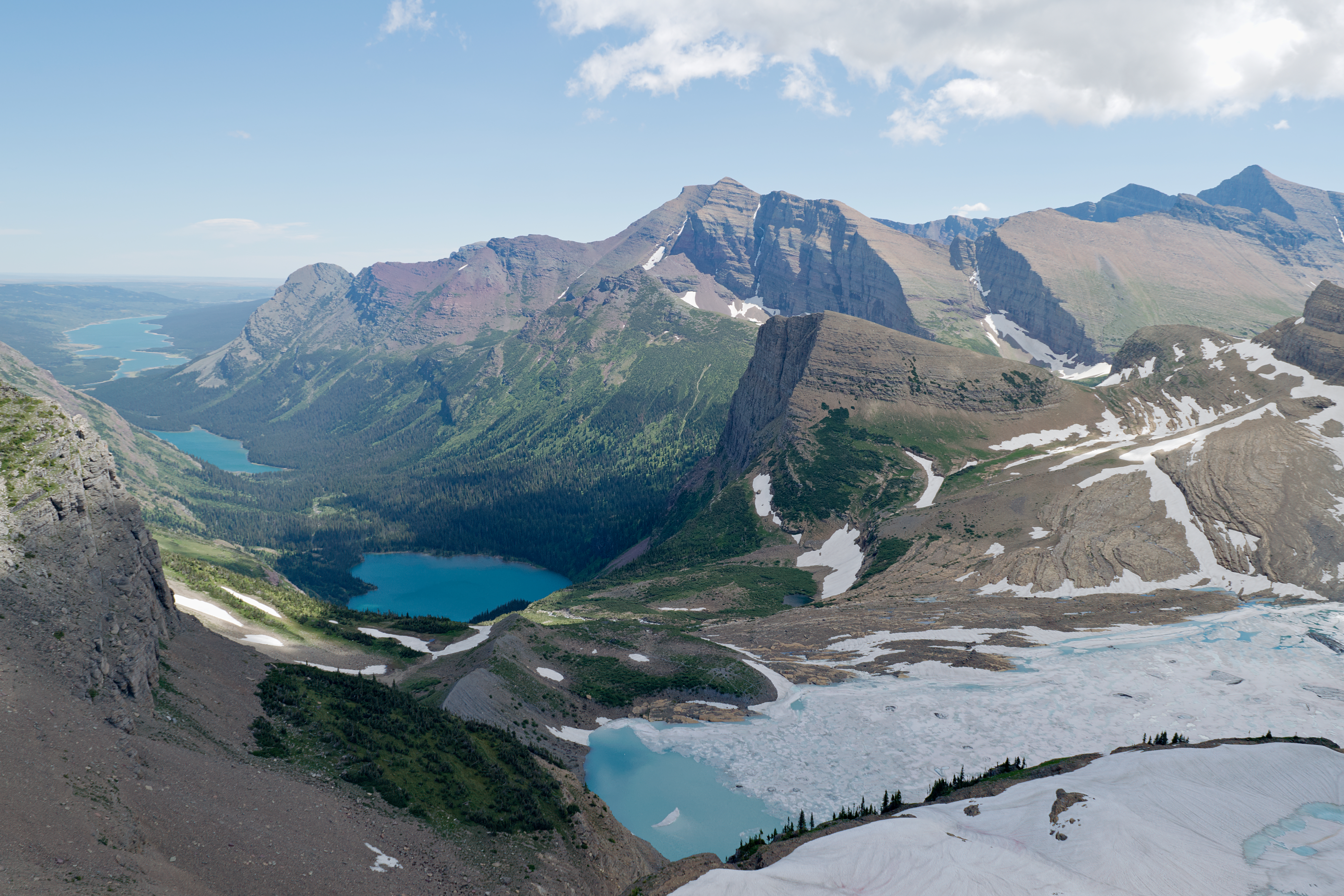
View from Grinnell Glacier Overlook

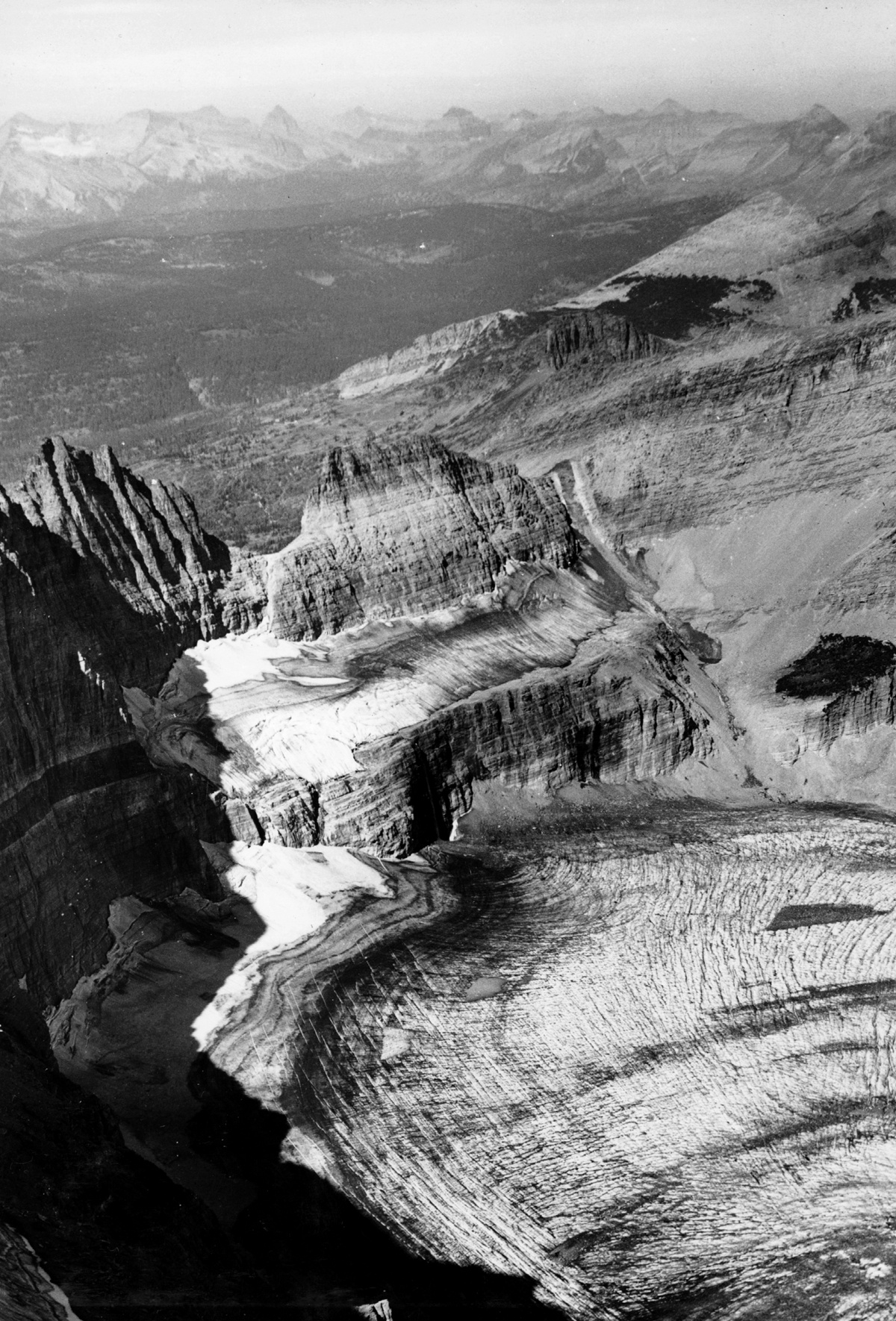
1938 T.J. Hileman GNP

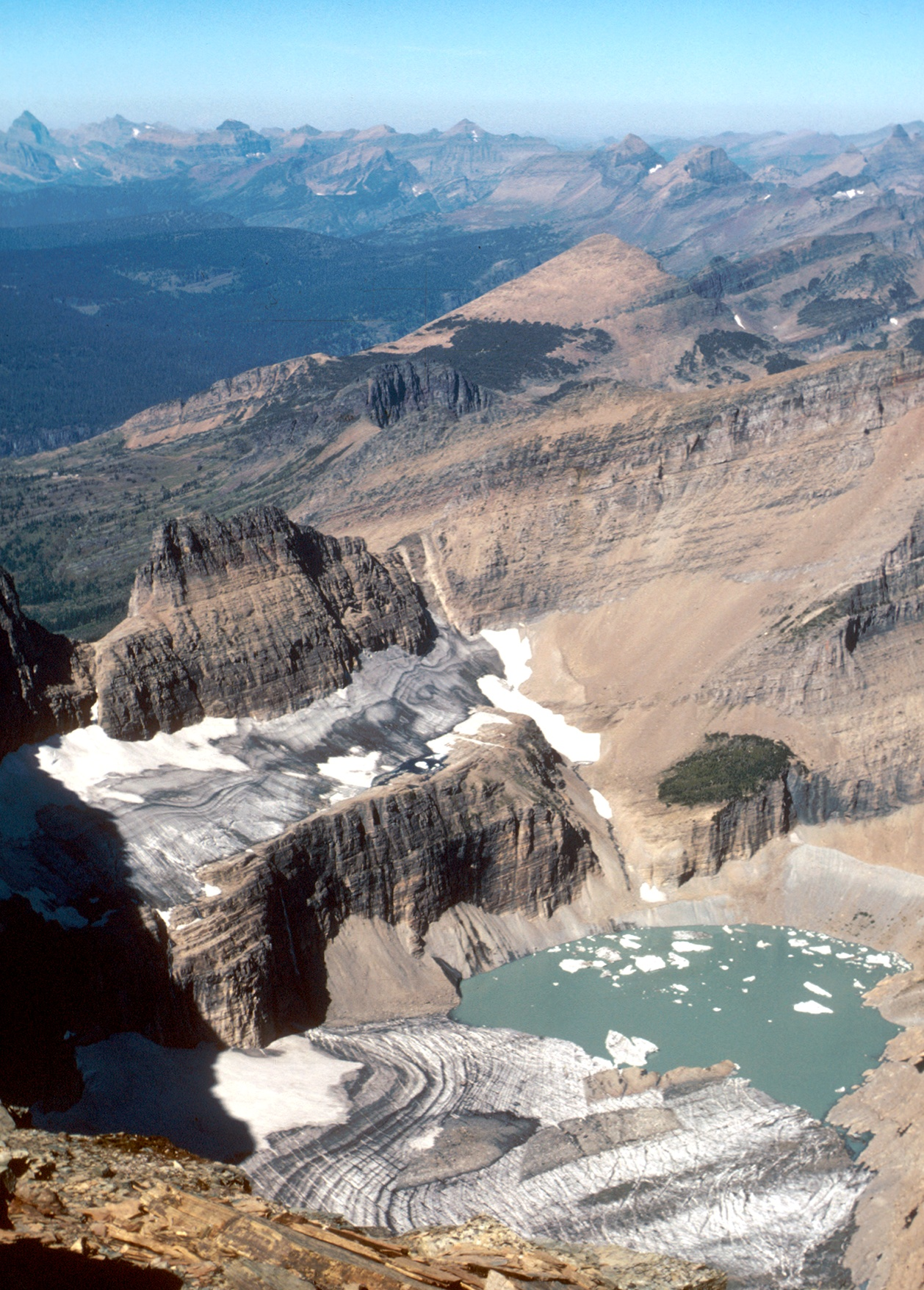
1981 Carl Key (USGS)

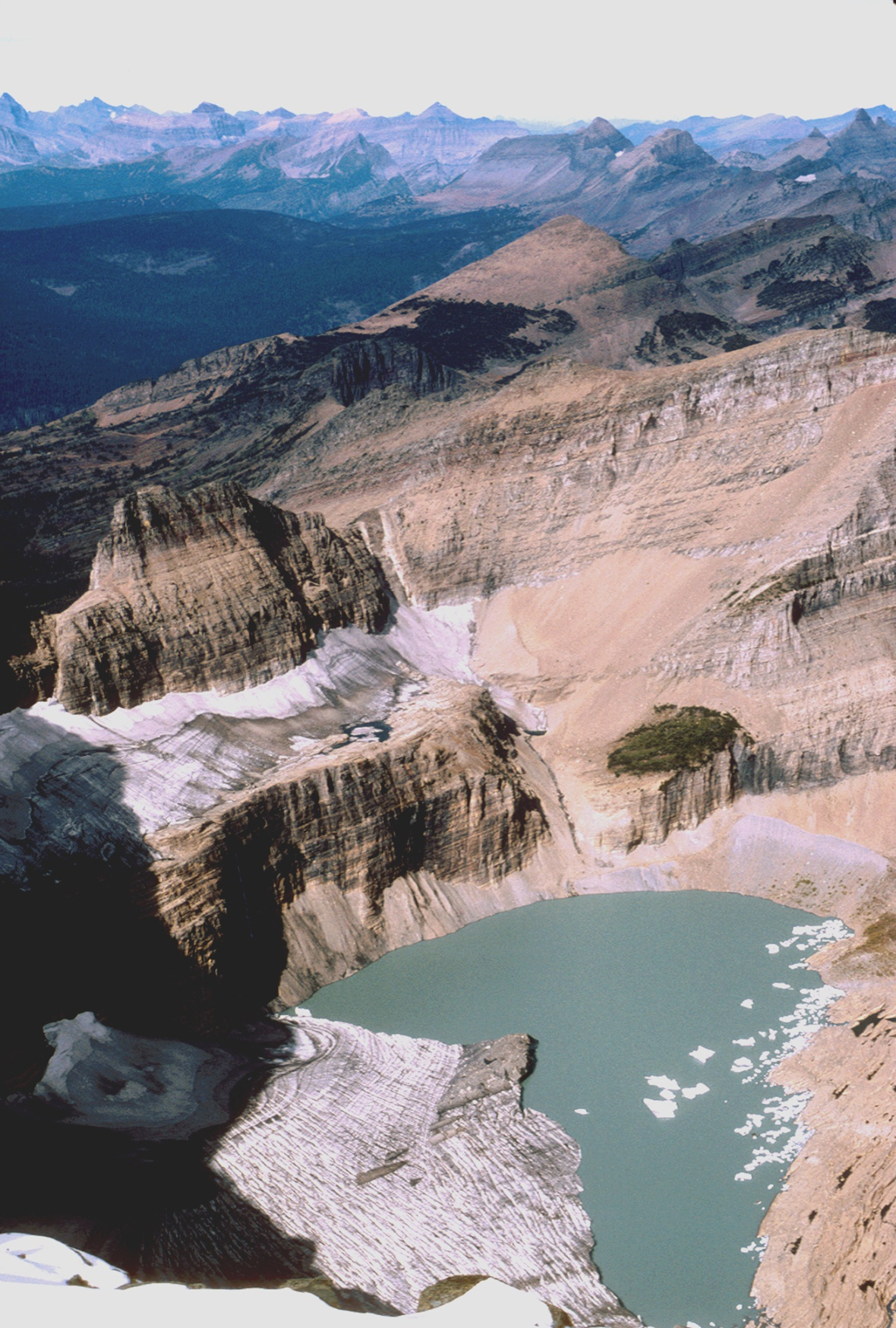
1998 Dan Fagre (USGS)

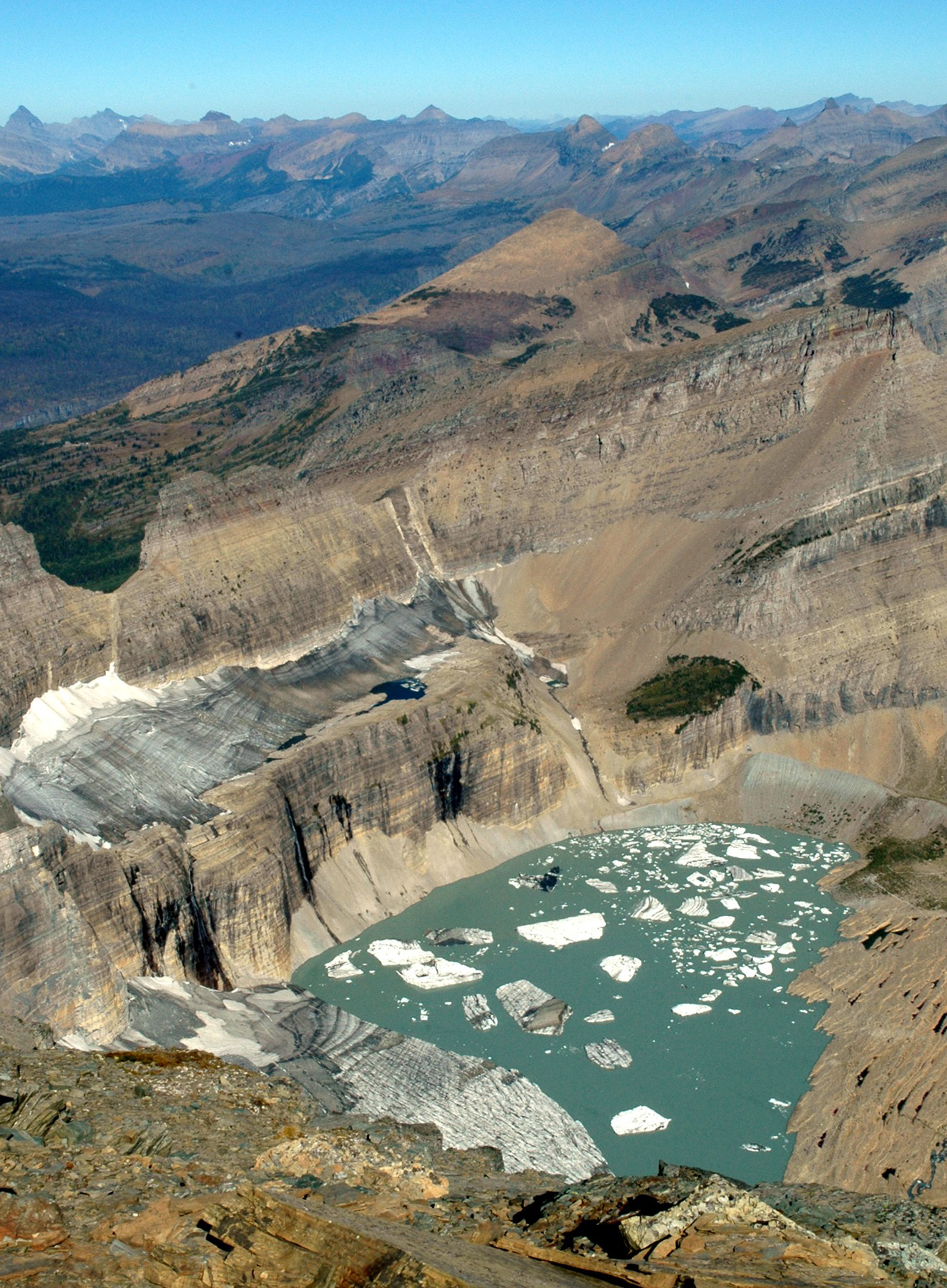
2005 Blase Reardon (USGS)

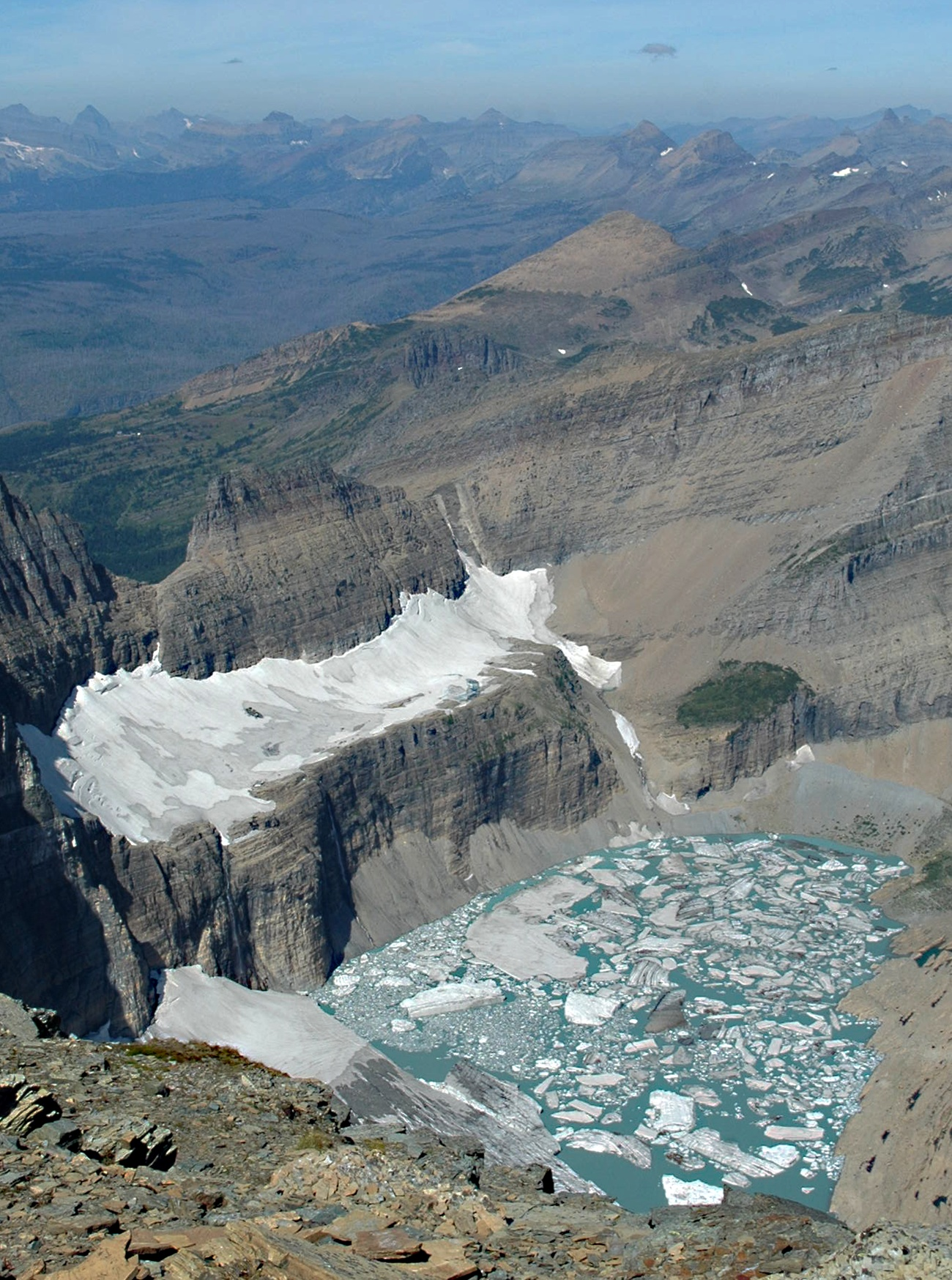
2009 Lindsey Bengtson (USGS)

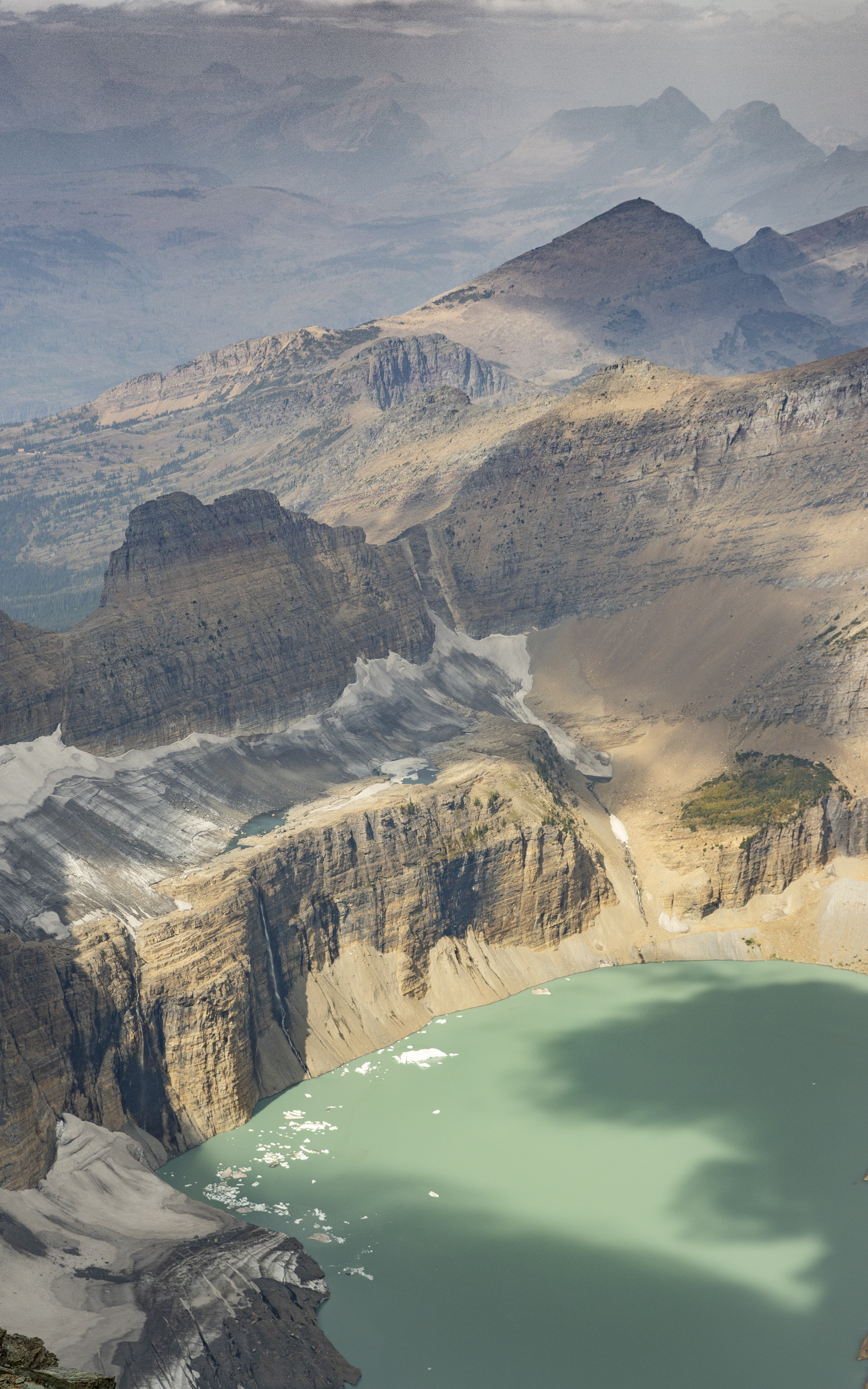
2021 National Park Service

== See also ==
- Retreat of glaciers since 1850
- List of glaciers in the United States
- Glaciers in Glacier National Park (U.S.)
