= Max Schradin =

German TV host and live streamer

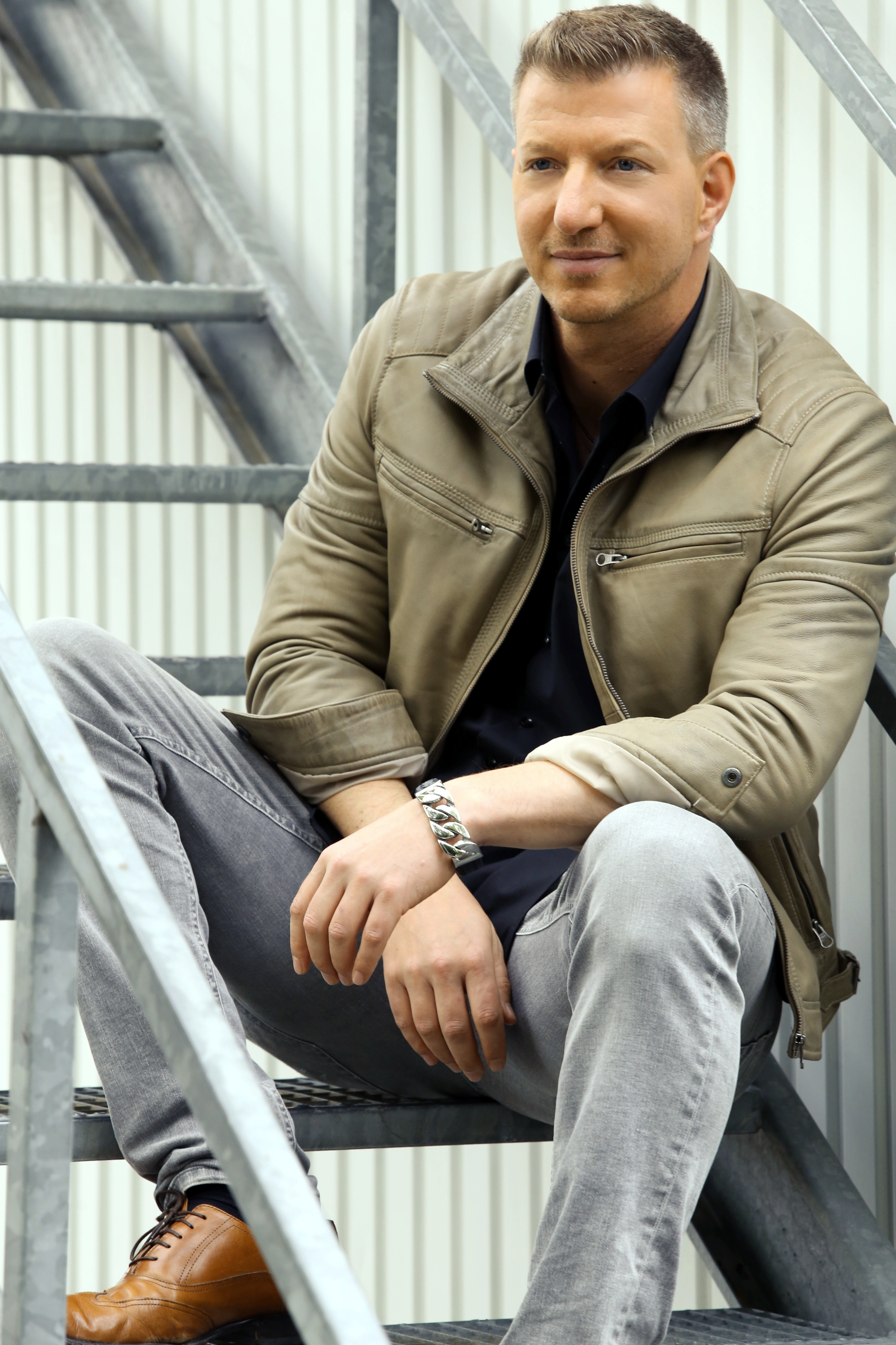
Max Schradin, 2018

Max Schradin (born 12 April 1978 in Frankfurt am Main) is a German TV host and live streamer. He became known for hosting game shows on the former television channel 9Live. Since 2021, he is an active referee in the soccer amateur scene and also known as an influencer since 2022.

== Early life and education ==
After finishing his Abitur at Feldberg school, Max Schradin completed his community service. Pausing his community service for two months, he did an internship at the TV show Arabella. After that, he started working as a warm-up artist to finance his acting studies at the international Michael-Tschechow school in Munich. During his training, he was part of several TV programs such as Arabella, Clip Mix and Nicole — Entscheidung am Nachmittag ("Nicole — Decision in the afternoon") and also acted as an event host for fairs and galas. He finished his studies after 2.5 years and began working at a casting agency in Munich in 2002.

== Career ==
=== Television hosting ===
In April 2003, Schradin started his career as a TV show host when taking over a slot of Sonnenklar.TV for 9Live. He remained with 9Live until it ceased live broadcasting operations on 31 May 2011. In 2012, he anchored at the regional internet radio Radio Fortuna in Heusenstamm, which, however, ceased operations following insolvency.

From 2012 to summer 2014, Schradin was a presenter for Channel 21, a German teleshopping network. Following that, he moved to 123.live, another teleshopping station, and stayed there from August 2014 to February 2022. In 2023, he moved back to 1-2-3.tv.

On 19 October 2014, Schradin hosted the saturday evening show Das große Autoquiz ("The big car quiz") at 8 p.m. on Sport1. On 12 February 2016, he hosted the gambling show drückglück.de on Sport1.

In February 2023, Schradin hosted the live show Die große Koffershow ("the big suitcase show") on Wir24 TV together with Jens Knossalla.

=== Streaming and social media ===
On 26 May 2021, Schradin began streaming live on Twitch on his account realmaximalschradin (today: SCHRADIN). In these streams, he comments on old TV shows and hosts interactive call-in quiz games under the name 9Live 2.0, based on the former channel 9Live. Participants can take part in the games free of charge via Discord or by telephone (at normal phone fees). Schradin also interacts with his viewers during the streams.

In 2022, Schradin achieved over 1.8 million views within just 24 hours with a video on TikTok which got him in the top 10 of the most-watched videos in Germany.

In October 2024, he took part in the Minecraft project “Craft Attack 12”, which he streamed live on Twitch.

=== Other ventures ===
Schradin made a guest appearance in the satire series Browser Ballett in 2020.

In 2021, Schradin announced that he will be working as an amateur soccer referee. In August 2022, he had the opportunity to lead a friendly match between the influencers Trymacs and Knossi. In addition, Schradin was confirmed to lead another match between Trymacs and EliasN97 on 12 July 2023.

== Controversies ==
In 2008, the call-in game critic Marc Döhler criticized Schradin's appearances on 9Live for what he saw as misleading statements, for example about the popularity of searched puzzle terms. Schradin insulted a fellow game show host by referring to him as “That blonde pedophile right there”, whereupon he was suspended for a short time. In addition, Schradin hosted a fraud case on 9Live on 17 November 2008, in which solutions were subsequently changed. According to his own statements, Schradin himself reported this incident and thereby contributed to the clarification

== Work ==
=== Hosting ===
- 2003–2004: Sonnenklar.TV (Call-in quizzes on 9Live)
- 2004–2011: 9Live (Call-in games)
- 2004–2010: Sat1, Kabel eins, ProSieben (Call-in quizzes)
- 2012–2014: Channel 21
- 2012: Radio Fortuna (Internet radio)
- 2014–2022, since 2023: 123.live
- 2014: Das große Autoquiz (Sport1, Call-in quizzes)
- 2016: drückglück.de (Sport1)
- Since 2020: Premium-shopping.tv
- Since 2021: MAXIMAL_SCHRADIN (Twitch)
- Since 2022: Wir24 TV
- 2023: MontanaBlack Christmas event

=== Guest appearances ===
- 1998: Arabella (ProSieben)
- 2005: Frühstücksfernsehen (Sat1)
- 2008: ClipfishTV (RTL)
- 2012: Roche und Böhmermann (ZDFneo)
- 2020: Browserballett (ARD)
- 2023: Erkennst DU den Song? (World Wide Wohnzimmer)
- 2023: Big Brother Knossi Edition
- 2024: Trymacs Twitch E-Scooter Tour

=== Discography ===
- 2024: Der Habicht hat zwei H.
