= SECS/GEM =

Semiconductor equipment

SECS/GEM is the semiconductor industry's equipment interface protocol for equipment-to-host data communications. It is the messaging standard that facilitates communication between process equipment made by disparate manufacturers (etch, deposition, polish, clean, and more) and the factory host. In an automated fab, the interface can start and stop equipment processing, collect measurement data, change variables, and select recipes for products. The SECS (SEMI Equipment Communications Standard)/GEM (Generic Equipment Model) standards do all this in a defined way.

Developed by the SEMI (Semiconductor Equipment and Materials International) organization, the standards define a common set of equipment behaviour and communications capabilities.

The Generic Model for Communications and Control Of Manufacturing Equipment (GEM) standard is maintained and published by the non-profit organization Semiconductor Equipment and Materials International (SEMI). Generally speaking, the SECS/GEM standard defines messages, state machines and scenarios to enable factory software to control and monitor manufacturing equipment.

The GEM standard is formally designated and referred to as SEMI standard E30, but frequently simply referred to as the GEM or SECS/GEM standard. GEM intends "to produce economic benefits for both device manufacturers and equipment suppliers..." by defining "... a common set of equipment behavior and communications capabilities that provide the functionality and flexibility to support the manufacturing automation programs of semiconductor device manufacturers" [SEMI E30, 1.3]. GEM is an implementation of the SECS-II standard, SEMI standard E5. Many equipment manufacturers in the industries of semiconductors (front end and back end), surface mount technology, electronics assembly, photovoltaics, flat panel displays and others provide a SECS/GEM interface so that the factory host software can communicate with the machine for monitoring and/or controlling purposes. Because the GEM standard was written with very few semiconductor-specific features, it can be applied to virtually any automated manufacturing equipment in any industry.

All GEM compliant manufacturing equipment share a consistent interface and certain consistent behavior. GEM equipment can communicate with a GEM capable host using either TCP/IP (using the HSMS standard, SEMI E37) or RS-232 based protocol (using the SECS-I standard, SEMI E4). Often both protocols are supported. Each equipment can be monitored and controlled using a common set of SECS-II messages specified by GEM.

There are many additional SEMI standards and factory specifications that reference the GEM standard and its features. These additional standards are either industry-specific or equipment-type specific. Following are a few examples.

Semiconductor Front-End
The semiconductor front-end industry defined a series of standards known as the GEM300 standards that includes SEMI standards E40, E87, E90, E94 and E116 and references the E39 standard. Each standard provides additional features to the GEM interface and builds upon the features in the GEM E30 standard. 300 mm factories worldwide use the underlying GEM standard's data collection features in order to monitor specific equipment activity such as wafer movement and process job execution. The SECS/GEM standard and the additional GEM300 standards are required on nearly each and every 300mm wafer manufacturing tool in order to implement full factory automation. This industry has been the strongest supporter of the GEM and related SEMI standards.
Semiconductor Back-End
Numerous equipment in the Semiconductor Back-End industry implement the GEM standard. Additional standards have been implemented such as SEMI E122 Standard for Tester Specific Equipment Model and SEMI E123 Standard for Handler Equipment Specific Equipment Model.
Surface Mount Technology
Many equipment in the Surface Mount Technology industry support the GEM standard, including chip placement, solder paste, oven and inspection equipment. The GEM standard has been used on these equipment for over 15 years, although it is not widely used in preference to other widely used Industry 4.0 options.
Photovoltaic
In 2008, the Photovoltaic industry officially decided to adopt the SECS/GEM standard and submitted a proposal for a new SEMI standard, ballot 4557, as a new PV industry standard. Even prior to adopting the GEM standard, several photovoltaic equipment suppliers already were capable of supporting the GEM standard. The new standard is called the PV02 "Guide for PV Equipment Communication Interfaces (PVECI)" and defines a framework that utilizes the SEMI E37 (HSMS), SEMI E5 (SECS-II), as well as sub-sets of SEMI E30 (GEM), SEMI E148 (NTP based time synchronization) and SEMI E10 (Definition and Measurement of Equipment Reliability and Availability) standards.
