= Thomas Haffa =

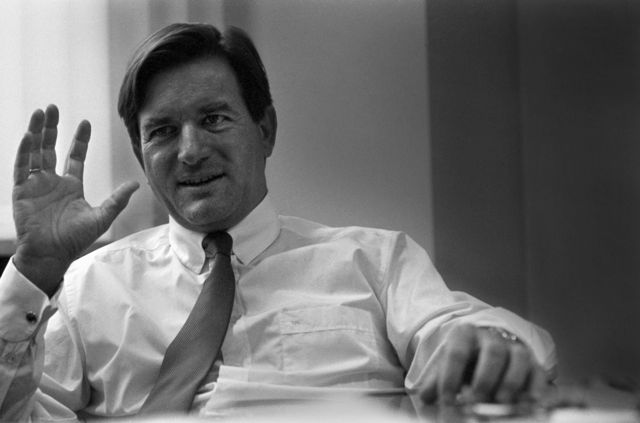
- Born: 18 May 1952 (age 72); Kressbronn Germany
- Occupation: Businessman
- Known for: CEO of EM.TV

Thomas Haffa (born 18 April 1952 in Kressbronn am Bodensee) is a German businessman who founded EM.TV, a German Media Company.

Haffa became known as CEO of EM.TV, one of the companies with a very spectacular rise and a very deep fall at the stock exchange segment Neuer Markt. In 2010 Haffa took the 229th place in the list of richest Germans with an estimated fortune of 200 to 300 million euros.

In April 2003, he was fined 1.2 million euros for misleading shareholders.

== Biography ==
After leaving school, Haffa, who grew up in Pfaffenhofen, started his apprenticeship as a wholesaler and salesman with a BMW dealer, then worked as a sales assistant at IBM from 1973 onwards. At the beginning of the 1980s, Haffa started with the Kirch Group and started to build the video game Taurus Video. Over the next few years, he has worked as a director of merchandising and music publishing companies.

In 1989, Haffa became self-employed and, together with his brother Florian and TV mogul Haim Saban, founded the EM-Entertainment Munich, Merchandising, Film und Fernseh GmbH (EM.TV). Marketing objects from this period are Tabaluga, the Teenage Mutant Hero Turtles and the rights of the Expo 2000.

With the stock exchanges on October 30, 1997, a spectacular rise from EM.TV began: the share price of 0.38 euros followed a record high after the other, also by the establishment of Junior TV at the end of 1998 together with the troubled Kirch Group. In the wake of the New Economy, Haffa made another spectacular acquisition, such as a 50% share of the marketing rights of the Formula 1 in 2000 (for about 3.3 billion euros) and the parent company of the Muppet Show EM.TV into a global media company. There were added the worldwide rights to well-known cartoon characters such as Maya the Honey Bee, The Flintstones and Alfred J. Kwak. The shares of EM.TV recorded a record high of 110 Euros in March 2000.

In the autumn of 2000, Thomas Haffa and his brother Florian, who worked as a financial director at EM.TV, had to correct the company's winners' expectations several times downwards. The share price then broke down and fell below 20 euros.

The brothers Thomas and Florian Haffa had sold a large part of their EM.TV shares in good time before announcement of the negative news and the strong price decline. Thomas Haffa had even violated the holding period when he sold shares at the price level in February 2000.

Thomas Haffa retired on 25 July 2001 as Chairman of the Board of EM.TV. He was sentenced to a fine of 1.2 million euros on 8 April 2003, his brother Florian to 240,000 euros because of misrepresentation of the company relations. The Federal Court of Justice confirmed this judgment at the end of 2004, the Federal Constitutional Court rejected a complaint from the Haffa brothers as "unfounded" in 2006. Thus, they were finally sentenced to criminal law. Both brothers had to submit to hundreds of court cases. Despite a ruling by the Federal Court of Justice in favor of injured shareholders, many of EM.TV's shareholders were not successful in their claims for damages because the required evidence of a direct link between the erroneous company reports and the decision of purchasing shares was difficult to provide.

In 2004, an investor group within Thomas Haffa, transferred the operative business of the insolvent commercial vehicle company Kögel Trailer in Ulm. Kögel had to file for insolvency again in 2009.

Thomas Haffa is the managing director of Munich-based Air Independence. In the spring of 2010, he acquired the majority of the teleshopping channel Channel 21. In May 2010, he and his wife Gabriele bought the shipping company Dahm International, which is one of the world's largest yacht dealers.
