= T. J. Hileman =

Photographer

T. J. (Tomar Jacob) Hileman (1882–1945) was an American photographer born in Manor Township, Armstrong County, Pennsylvania, who is renowned for his photos of Glacier Park in Montana, and Blackfoot people.

After working a while in Chicago and graduating from Effingham School of Photography there, he moved to Colorado and began to take photographs. In 1911, Hileman moved to Kalispell, Montana to open his own portrait studio. He and Alice Georgeson were the first couple to marry in Glacier National Park in 1913.

Appointed the official photographer for the Great Northern Railway in 1924, Hileman took photos of Glacier National Park and Waterton Lakes National Park in Alberta, Canada, moving bulky camera equipment by packhorse, even at times perching on a narrow ledge to get just the right image on film. He also photographed the Prince of Wales Hotel in Waterton, Alberta, which was built by the railway. In 1926, Hileman opened photo-finishing labs in both Glacier Park Lodge and Many Glacier Hotel, which were convenient for tourists who could drop off their film in the evenings and pick up their prints the next morning.

== Photographs of local celebrities, Kainai and Piegan Indians ==
In 1985, the Glacier Natural History Association purchased more than a thousand of Hileman's nitrate negatives, which were added to the collection of Hileman's albums which already contained more than 2,000 prints. Some 107 of these photos were purchased by the Glenbow Museum in Canada, where they comprise part of their collection relating to Blackfoot history. These photos are especially valuable to researchers for their examples of Kainai and South Peigan styles of clothing, hairstyles, ornaments, and housing.

== Documentation of climate change ==
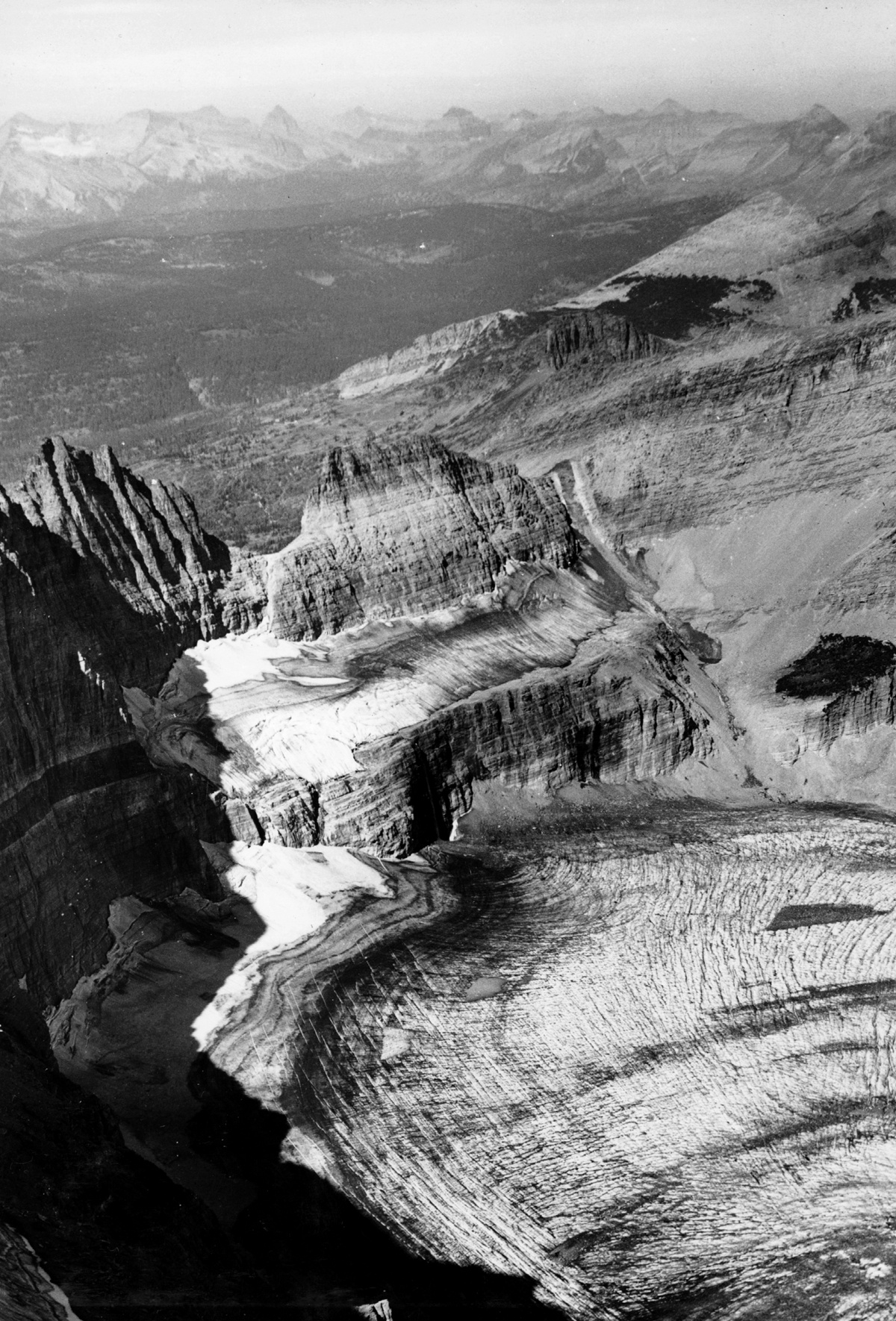
Hileman's 1938 image of Grinnell Glacier

Hileman's 1938 photo of Grinnell Glacier has been used as an early image documenting the state of that glacier in the first half of the 1900s. Subsequent photos in the ensuing decades, which have been taken from the same vantage point, show evidence of a steady state of retreat for that glacier.
