= Salamander Glacier =

Glacier in Montana, United States

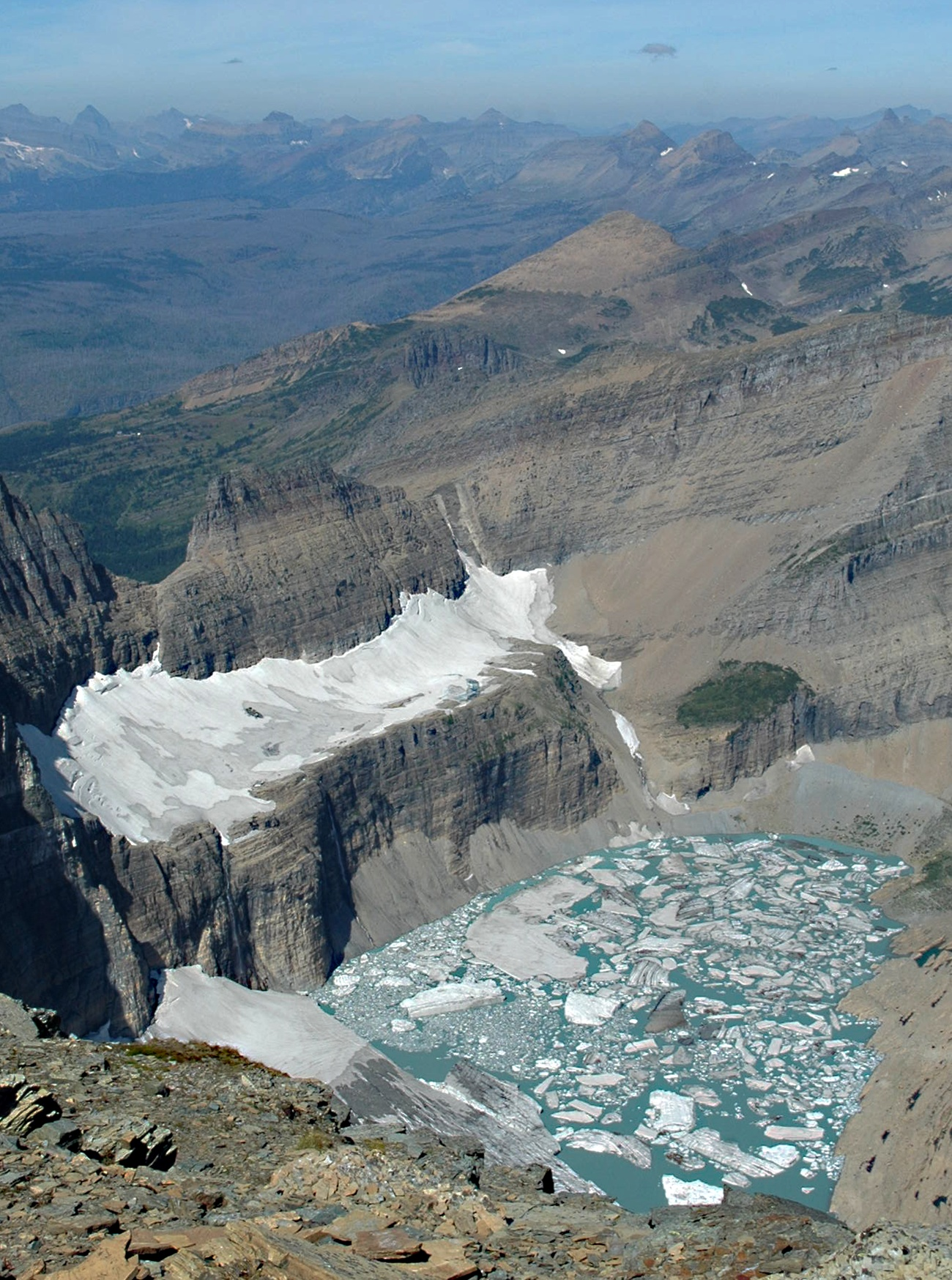
- The Salamander Glacier sits on a ledge above the greatly diminished Grinnell Glacier and the ice clogged Grinnell Lake in this 2009 image

- Location within Montana
- Type: Mountain glacier
- Location: Glacier National Park, Glacier County, Montana, U.S.
- Coordinates: 48°45′29″N 113°44′18″W
- Area: Approximately 42 acres (0.17 km^{2}) in 2005
- Length: .10 mi (0.16 km)
- Terminus: Rock ledge
- Status: Retreating

The Salamander Glacier is a glacier in Glacier National Park in the U.S. state of Montana. The glacier lies on a shelf on the east side of the arête which is part of the Continental Divide, at an average elevation of 7,200 feet (2,200 m) above sea level. The Salamander Glacier covered an area of approximately 57 acres (0.23 km^{2}) as of 1993. Before Grinnell Glacier retreated significantly, it used to encompass The Salamander Glacier and the two become separate sometime before 1929. The Salamander Glacier was measured at 42 acres (0.17 km^{2}) in 2005, which is a 23 percent reduction since 1966. Though only .10 mi (0.16 km) in length, The Salamander Glacier is about .75 mi (1.21 km) wide.

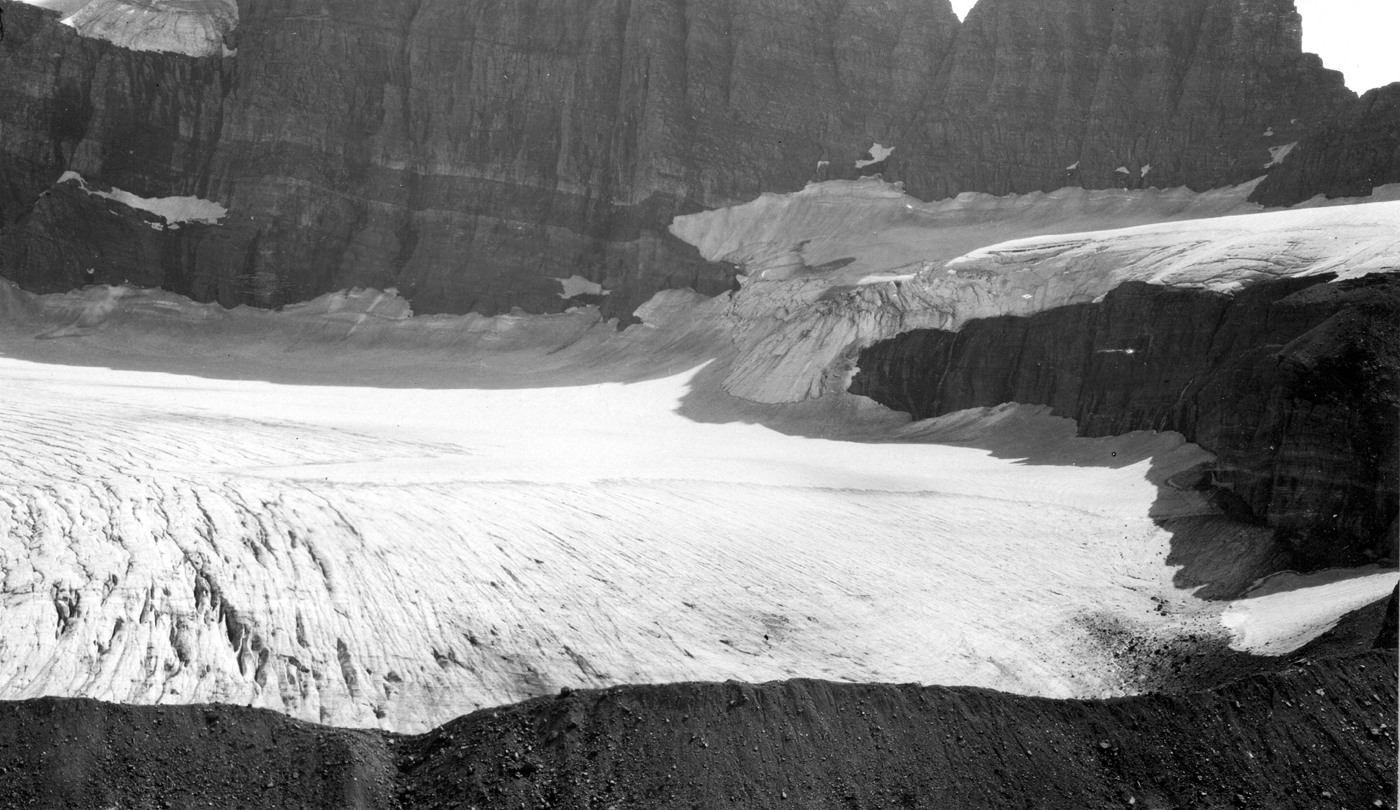
Grinnell Glacier (foreground) connected to The Salamander Glacier (upper right) as photographed in 1911

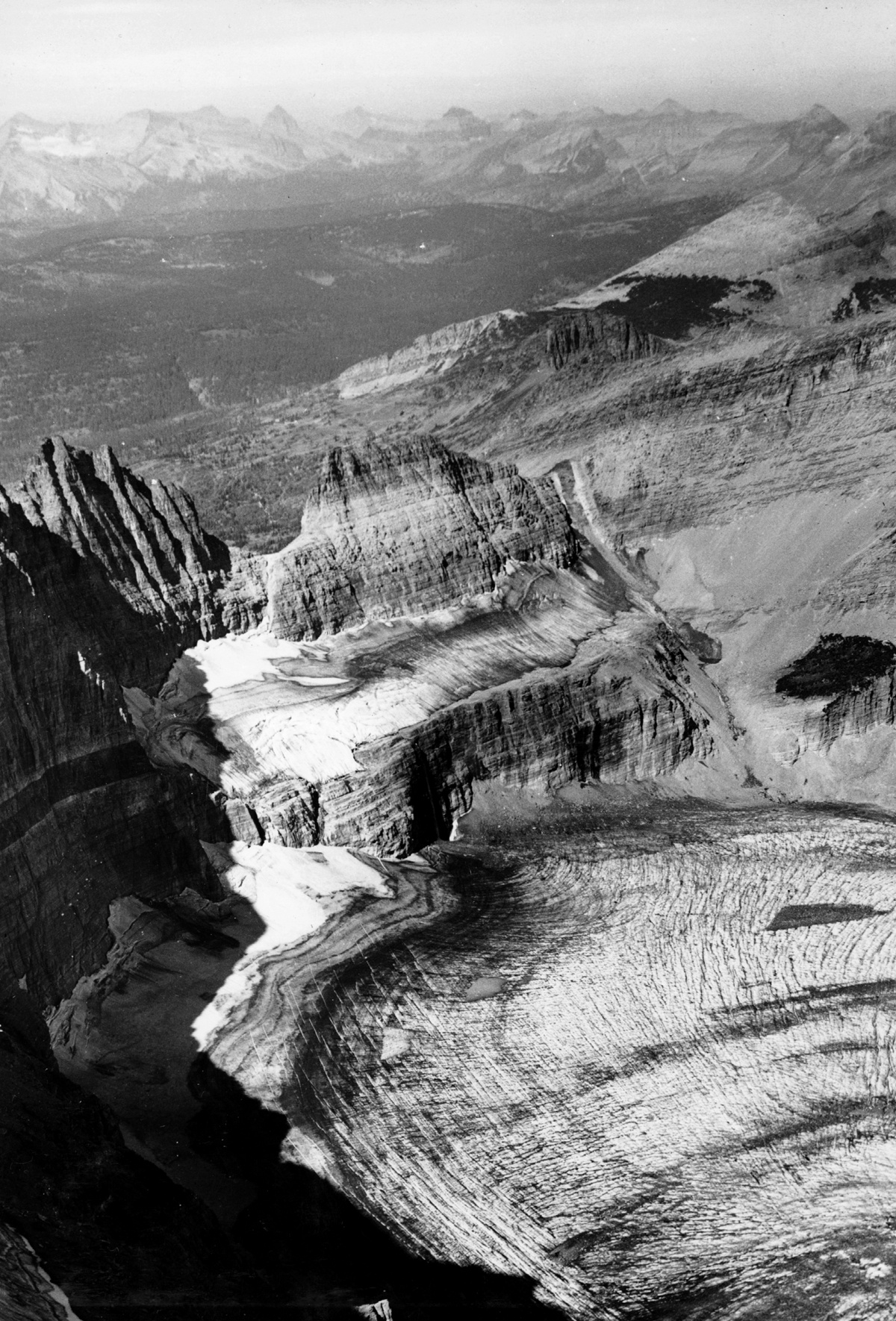
The glacier above Grinnell Glacier as photographed in 1938

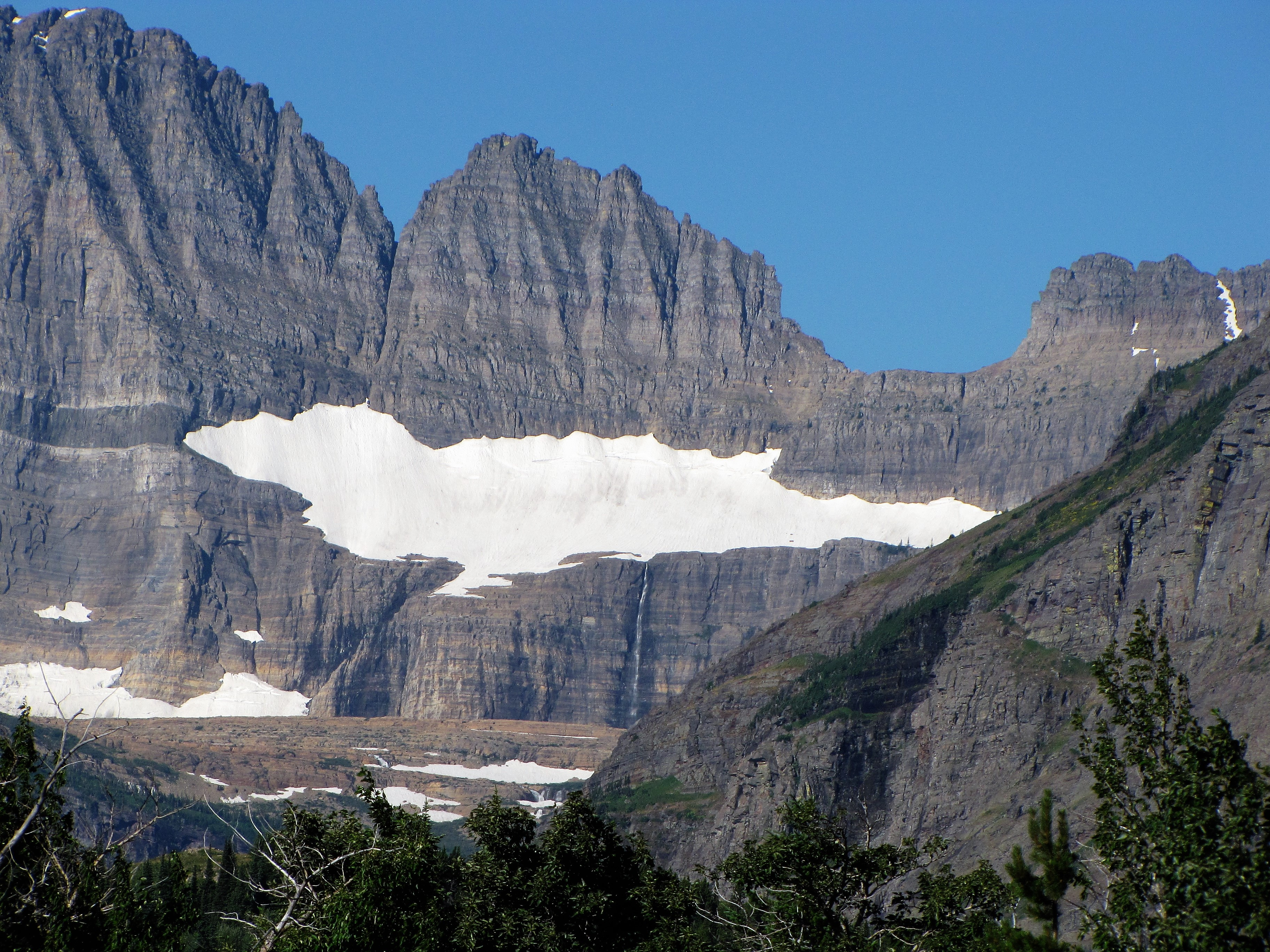
The glacier from Many Glacier Valley in July 2017

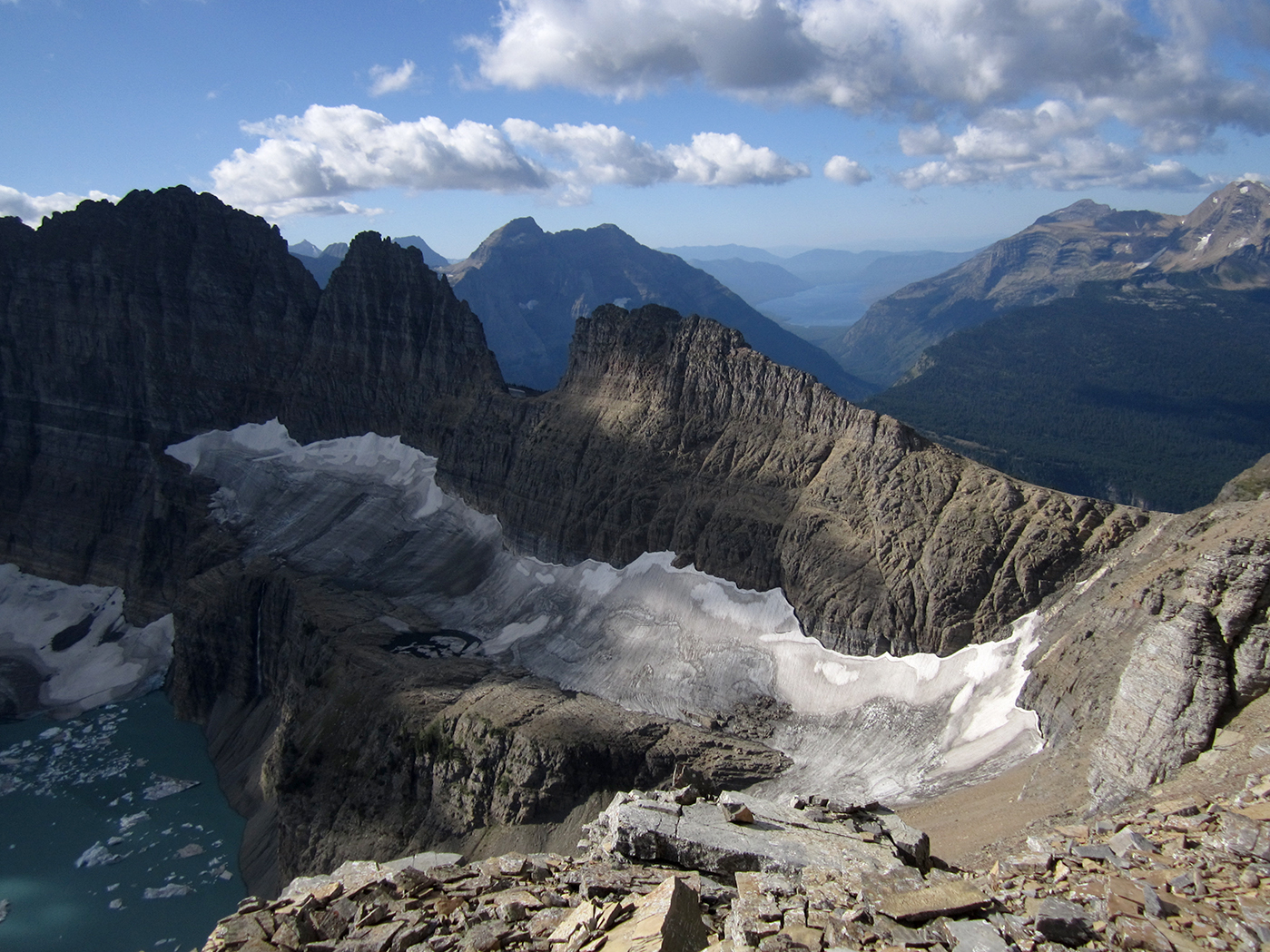
The glacier from the north in September 2019

== See also ==
- List of glaciers in the United States
- Glaciers in Glacier National Park (U.S.)
