= Discogs =

Website and database devoted to audio recordings

- Screenshot of Discogs home page on February 12, 2025
- Website type: Music
- Available in: English, German, Spanish, Portuguese (BR), French, Italian, Japanese, Korean, Russian
- Headquarters: Beaverton, Oregon, U.S.
- Owners: Zink Media, LLC
- Creator: Kevin Lewandowski
- Industry: Internet
- Services: Database, online shopping
- Revenue: Advertising, marketplace fees
- Employees: 110
- Website: www.discogs.com
- Commercial: Partially
- Registration: Optional
- Launched: November 2000; 26 years ago

Discogs (/dɪˈskɒɡz/ disk-OGZ; short for "discographies") is an online database and marketplace for audio recordings, including commercial releases, promotional releases, and bootleg or off-label releases. Database contents are user-generated, and described in The New York Times as "Wikipedia-like", and users can purchase vinyl records, CDs, cassette tapes, and other music formats from online sellers. Its specialty and innovation is to distinguish the specific releases of music (for example, over 400 different versions of the Saturday Night Fever soundtrack).

While the site was originally created with the goal of becoming the largest online database of electronic music, it now includes releases in all genres and on all formats. By 2015, it had a new goal: that of "cataloging every single piece of physical music ever created." As of 2026, its database contains over 19 million user-submitted release listings.

== History ==
Discogs was started in 2000 by Kevin Lewandowski who worked as a programmer at Intel. It was originally started from a computer in Lewandowski's closet and was limited to electronic music. By 2015, Discogs had 37 employees, 3 million users, and a monthly traffic of 20 million visits.

In 2005, Discogs launched a marketplace where users can buy and sell albums. The Discogs Marketplace is modeled similar to Amazon and eBay, where sellers offer items for sale and a fee is charged on the sold item. Its release listings are filterable by the country they ship from, format, currency, genre, style, format description, media condition, year released, seller name, and whether the buyer is invited to "make an offer."

In July 2007, a new subscription-based system for sellers was introduced on the site, called Market Price History. It gave premium users access to the past price items that were sold for up to 12 months ago by previous sellers who had sold exactly the same release (though 60 days of information was free). At the same time, the US$12 per year charge for advanced subscriptions was abolished, as it was felt that the extra features should be made available to all subscribers, now that a different revenue stream had been found from sellers and purchasers. Later that year, all paid access features were discarded and full use of the site became free of charge, allowing all users to view the full 12-month Market Price History of each item.

In addition to the database and marketplace, Discogs operates an online editorial platform, Discogs Digs, which publishes interviews and record-collection profiles under series such as "Vinylogue" and has featured DJs and collectors including Thurston Moore, Colleen "Cosmo" Murphy, DJ Marky and Argentine selector and music curator Soledad Rodríguez Zubieta (SRZ).

== See also ==
- List of online music databases
- Global Electronic Music Marketplace
