= TGGC Outlet =

- Country: United Kingdom
- Headquarters: Warwickshire

Programming
- Picture format: 576i (16:9, SDTV)

Ownership
- Owner: The Genuine Gemstone Company
- Sister channels: Gems TV; Jewellery Maker

History
- Launched: 25 July 2008 (online); 1 December 2009 (TV)
- Replaced: Travel Deals Direct
- Closed: 15 July 2013
- Replaced by: High Street Xtra
- Former names: Rocks TV (25 July 2008 – 2 January 2011); Gems TV Extra (2 January 2011 – 13 December 2012)

Links
- Website: www.tggcoutlet.com

TGGC Outlet (The Genuine Gemstone Company Outlet) was a British reverse auction clearance jewellery shopping channel. The channel was available on Sky and online. The channel's operations were based at Eagle Road Studios in Redditch, near Birmingham. The channel broadcast live from 11am to 7pm and used a clearance format and is the sister channel to Gems TV and Jewellery Maker.

== History ==
=== Rocks TV (2008–2011) ===
Original Rocks TV logo used from 25 July 2008 to July 2010

The channel originally launched as Rocks TV and was founded by the formation of The Coloured Company Group Limited in 2008 by Steve Bennett, his brother John and his wife Sarah. Steve had already had experience in the field of jewellery and shopping television as he was one of the original founders of Gems TV, of which he left a year prior to the launch of Rocks TV.

Final Rocks TV logo used from July 2010 to 2 January 2011

=== Gems TV Extra (2011–2012) ===
On 7 December 2010, it was announced on the channel that Rocks TV would be rebranded as Gems TV Extra and would merge with sister channel; Gem Collector. As a result, the channel moved from Sky 647 to Sky 656 and on 1 January 2011, its EPG slot on 647 was sold to Retail Therapy TV.

The new format included more themed hours and regular Gem Collector hours.

Gems TV Extra was added to Freesat channel 818 on 1 February 2011.

=== TGGC Outlet (2012–2013) ===
On 13 December 2012, Gems TV Extra ceased broadcasting. The channel was relaunched as TGGC Outlet, with a new studio and clearance format on 15 December 2012. On 2 April 2013, the channel was removed from Freesat It was replaced by a new channel called 'The Lounge'.

On 15 July 2013, the channel was replaced by High Street Xtra, a sister channel to High Street TV.

== Online only launch ==
Rocks TV started out as an online only based shopping 'Television channel'. The channel started a 3-day beta testing on 25 July 2008, which was exclusively available for friends of the company and members at ShoppingTelly.com. The official launch of the channel was on 28 July 2008 and was initially live between 5pm and 11pm.

== TV launch ==
On 1 December 2009, Rocks TV successfully acquired an EPG slot on Sky 647 from Travel Deals Direct and started broadcasting pre-recorded shows throughout December until 6 January 2010, when the company returned from the Christmas break and started broadcasting live on TV and online. Its broadcasting hours were extended following the online launch in July 2008.
