= 18... =

Studio album by G.E.M.
- Released: October 27, 2009
- Recorded: 2009
- Genre: Pop
- Length: 47:26
- Language: Mandarin; Cantonese; English
- Label: Hummingbird Music; Forward Music; Sony Music
- Producer: Lupo Groinig

G.E.M. chronology
G.E.M. (2008)	18... (2009)	My Secret (2010)

Singles from 18...
- 1. "All About U" Released: October 27, 2009; 2. "A.I.N.Y" Released: October 27, 2009; 3. "Mascara" Released: October 27, 2009

18... is the debut studio album by Hong Kong singer-songwriter G.E.M., released on October 27, 2009, by Forward Music, Hummingbird Music and Sony Music. The album contains twelve songs that spans various genres and styles such as pop, R&B, soul, and rock ballads. Produced by Lupo Groinig, its lyrics were predominately written by G.E.M. with collaborators such as Anie Fann and Mini Choi.

18... features the songs "All About U", "A.I.N.Y", and "Mascara". The Taiwanese edition of the album was released in May 2010, which features a Mandarin version of "Where Did U Go" from her self-titled debut EP (2008).

== Background ==
The album title 18...' refers to G.E.M.'s age at the time, and records her mood, love, and views on the world and her own life when she was 18. All the songs in the album were either written or co-written by G.E.M. herself. In addition, the album cover, related visuals and music videos were shot in Japan, and some of the songs were recorded in Los Angeles, USA.

== Songs ==
G.E.M. said that when she first heard the demo of "All About U," she did not feel very strongly about it. It was not until she listened to it repeatedly on the flight to Los Angeles for recording that she gradually appreciated the charm of the song and began to write the lyrics. “A.I.N.Y." is a song that G.E.M. wrote out of fantasy while taking a shower, not her emotional experience; the song's concept is ”Even though I need you, I still have to leave you". "Mascara" was a song written by G.E.M. after she experienced her first heartbreak. "G.E.M. (Get Everybody Moving)" is an interactive song; G.E.M. invited all employees of her company to record it together, and then compiled it into a theme song to introduce the meaning of her English stage name. "18" is a commemorative song written by Deng Ziqi to commemorate her adulthood, expressing this once-in-a-lifetime mood in the form of self-recording and singing.

When the album was first released in mainland China and Taiwan, G.E.M. specially adapted the track "Where Did U Go" into Mandarin and wrote "Endless Tenderness" based on her second relationship.

== Release ==
18... was simultaneously released with the limited edition, 18 Plus. The 18 USB was initially released for G.E.M.'s 18 Live Concert on November 11, 2009, however, it was later put on general sale. Due to the popularity of the album, it was republished as the 18... (3rd Edition). The release includes a bonus track titled "Smoking, Drinking & Swearing" (食煙飲酒講粗口). A Taiwanese edition of the album was released on May 14, 2010. The edition consisted of three additional Mandarin tracks (one titled "寫不出的溫柔" and two tracks previously released on her self-titled EP). It was also released with a limited-edition version.

== Accolades ==
18... was named one of the top ten best-selling Cantonese records at the 2009 IFPI Hong Kong Record Sales Awards. "A.I.N.Y." won various awards, including Best Original Song at the 2009 Metro Radio Music Awards, Best Mandarin Song at the 2010 edition of the same event, and Top Ten Best-Selling Digital Songs at the 2011 IFPI Hong Kong Record Sales Awards.

== Track listing ==
18... – standard edition
No.	Title	Length
1.	"All About U"	4:01
2.	"Game Over" (想講你知)	3:09
3.	"Gotta Say It"	2:52
4.	"A.I.N.Y" (愛你)	3:54
5.	"Mascara" (煙燻妝)	4:05
6.	"I Don't Get Love" (我不懂愛)	3:32
7.	"Seine River" (塞納河)	3:30
8.	"Italian Love" (意式戀愛)	3:33
9.	"G.E.M. (Get Everybody Moving)"	3:27
10.	"18"	3:35
11.	"Where Did U Go 2.0" (Sam Vahdat Remix)	3:55
12.	"Mascara (Glossy Version)"	4:01
Total length:		43:34

18... (3rd Edition) – bonus track
No.	Title	Length
13.	"Drinking, Smoking & Swearing" (食煙飲酒講粗口)	2:40
Total length:		2:40

18... – Taiwanese edition
No.	Title	Lyrics	Music	Length
1.	"Xie Bu Wan de Wen Rou" (寫不完的溫柔)	G.E.M.	Skot Suyama	3:50
2.	"A.I.N.Y." (愛你)	G.E.M.	Lupo Groinig, G.E.M.	3:44
3.	"I Don't Get Love" (我不懂愛)	Qi Zi	Peter Roberts	3:32
4.	"Mascara" (煙燻妝)	G.E.M., AnieFann	G.E.M.	4:05
5.	"Love Me Now" (愛現在的我)	Ting Chu, Tan Chang, G.E.M.	Ting Chu	3:23
6.	"Seine River" (塞納河)	Chen Hongyu	G.E.M.	3:30
7.	"Hourglass of Memories" (回憶的沙漏)	Ting Chu	G.E.M.	3:53
8.	"All About U"	G.E.M.	Marc Nelkin	4:01
9.	"G.E.M. (Get Everybody Moving)"	Lupo Groining, G.E.M.	Lupo Groining, G.E.M.	3:27
10.	"Gotta Say It" (想講你知)	G.E.M.	Marc Nelkin, Jennifer Karr, Sidh Solanki	2:52
11.	"Game Over"	Tan Chang, Aaron Wong, G.E.M.	Mary-L, Yann Cortella	3:09
12.	"18"	G.E.M.	G.E.M.	3:35
Total length:				43:01

== Release history ==
Release dates and formats for 18...
Region	Date	Edition(s)	Format(s)	Label
Asia	October 27, 2009	Standard edition	CD; digital download; streaming	Hummingbird Music
Hong Kong	November 24, 2009	Limited edition	USB	Hummingbird Music
Hong Kong	February 11, 2010	Enhanced version	CD	Hummingbird Music
Taiwan	May 14, 2010	Taiwanese edition	CD	Hummingbird Music
