= GEM Motoring Assist =

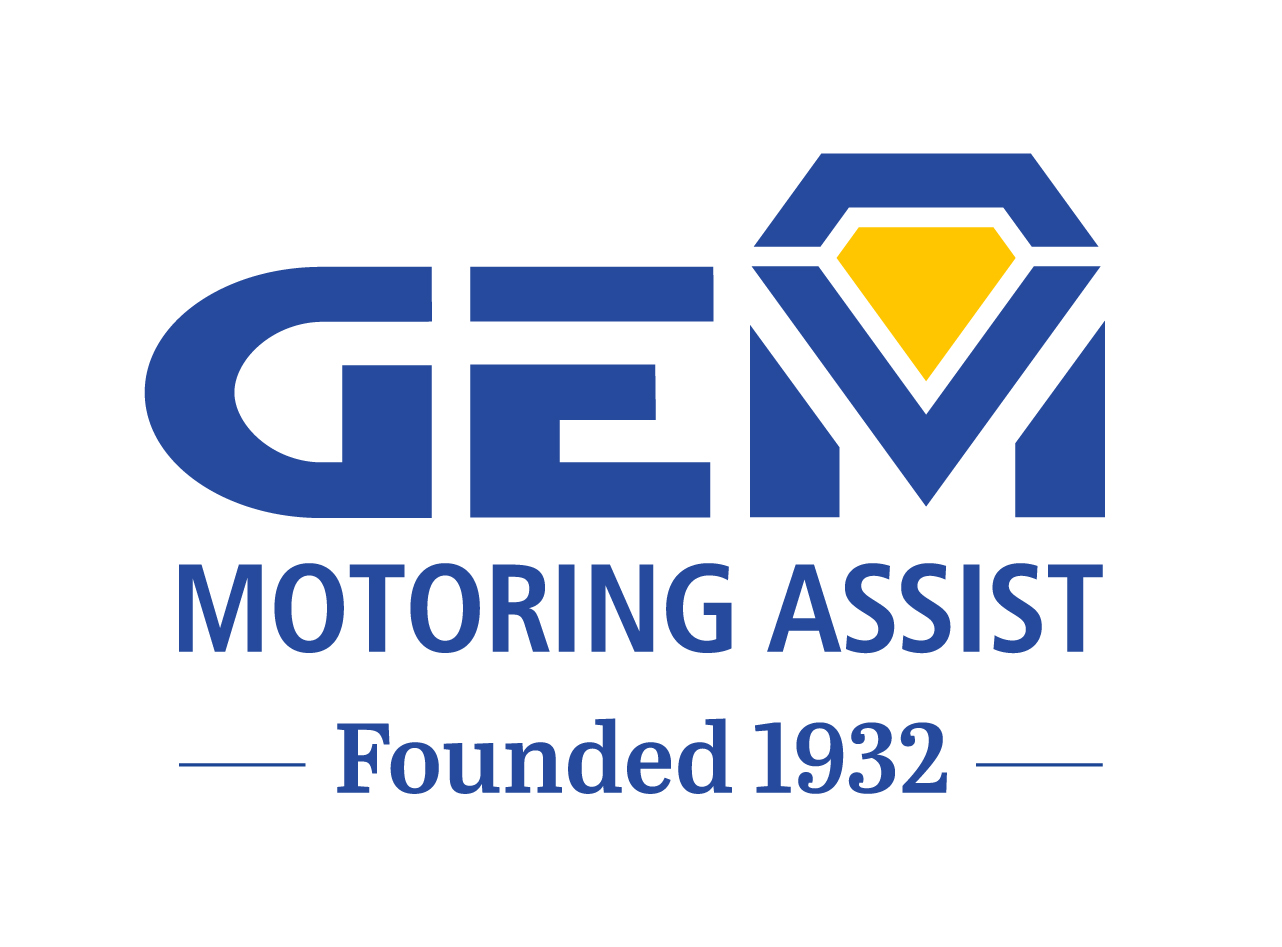
- Formerly: Company of Veteran Motorists (1932–1983); The Guild of Experienced Motorists (1983–2004)
- Industry: Automotive services
- Founded: 1932
- Headquarters: East Sussex, United Kingdom
- Services: Road safety and motoring advice; Breakdown assistance
- Website: www.motoringassist.com

GEM Motoring Assist is a road safety and breakdown recovery organisation based in the UK. It was formed in 1932 as the Company of Veteran Motorists and operated under this name until 1983, when it was renamed The Guild of Experienced Motorists as a symbolic brand name. In 2004 the name was amended to GEM Motoring Assist, as it is known today, which reflects its position as a provider of assistance to its members in all matters relating to motoring. GEM provides motoring and safety literature for the general public from their website in addition to offering its members breakdown cover.

GEM first began offering breakdown services in 1978 to club members. It operates a 24-hour Rescue Control Centre to arrange assistance from a nationwide network of over 6,000 recovery vehicles. As well as offering the traditional breakdown service they offer a pay and reclaim scheme

== See also ==
- Vehicle recovery
