= G.E.M. (EP) =

EP by G.E.M.
- Released: October 15, 2008
- Recorded: 2008
- Genre: Pop; R&B
- Length: 18:56
- Language: Cantonese
- Label: Hummingbird

G.E.M. chronology
G.E.M. (2008)	18... (2009)

Singles from 18...
- 1. "Where Did U Go" Released: September 15, 2008; 2. "Sleeping Beauty" Released: October 15, 2008

G.E.M. is the debut self-titled extended play (EP) by Hong Kong singer-songwriter G.E.M., released on October 15, 2008, through Hummingbird Music.

== Critical reception ==
Professional ratings
Review scores
Source	Rating
Sina Music	8.3/10

Hong Kong musician Li Chongyan praised "Where Did U Go" as an excellent lyrical piece with a smooth and catchy and beautiful melody. He also commended the singer's performance and her "powerful voice that captivates the listener." Li commented that while the style and lyrics of "Sleeping Beauty" were not particularly remarkable, the song nevertheless remains beautiful, though it lacked some originality.

== Commercial performance ==
Three weeks after the release of G.E.M., the initial 5,000 copies of the EP were sold out. By early January 2009, following G.E.M.'s recognition as Best New Artist at various award ceremonies, the first edition EP was completely sold out.

A special version with a game disc, limited to 1,000 copies, was released in January 2009 and was sold out immediately due to some fans mistakenly believing that the regular edition. Hummingbird Music quickly printed an additional 3,000 copies. The second edition became another high-demand item both in the market and online. The record company reprinted it once more and released it on February 5.

On March 8, G.E.M. held a "Get Everyone Moving" autograph session, where it was announced that the EP had reached sales of 100,000 copies and had been reprinted for its third edition.

== Accolades ==
Awards and nominations
Year	Organization	Award	Result	Ref.
2008	Ultimate Song Chart Awards	Gold Award for Best New Female Singer	Won	
2009	Chinese Music Media Awards	Best Cantonese Female Newcomer Award	Won	

== Track listing ==
G.E.M. track listing
No.	Title	Length
1.	"The One" (等一個他)	3:04
2.	"Where Did U Go"	3:54
3.	"Hourglass of Memories" (回憶的沙漏)	3:53
4.	"Love Me Now" (愛現在的我)	3:23
5.	"Sleeping Beauty" (睡公主)	4:42
Total length:		18:56
