= Where Did U Go =

Single by G.E.M.

from the EP G.E.M.
- Language: Cantonese; English
- Released: September 15, 2008
- Recorded: 2008
- Genre: Pop
- Length: 3:54
- Label: Hummingbird
- Songwriter(s): G.E.M.; Skot Suyama
- Producer(s): Mark Lui

G.E.M. singles chronology
"Where Did U Go" (2008)	"Sleeping Beauty" (2008)

Music video
- "Where Did U Go" on YouTube "Xie Bu Wan de Wen Rou" on YouTube

"Where Did U Go" is a song by Hong Kong singer-songwriter G.E.M., released as her debut single through Hummingbird Music on September 15, 2008. The song was written by G.E.M. and Skot Suyama, whilst production was handled by Mark Lui. It was released as the lead single for her debut self-titled Cantonese extended play, G.E.M. (2008). Musically, it is a pop number with lyrics about the singer's breakup with her first lover.

"Where Did U Go" won several awards at Hong Kong award ceremonies, including Top Songs at the Jade Solid Gold Awards and World's Favorite Cantonese Song Award at the TVB8 Golden Songs Awards. A remix by Sam Vahdat was released as part of G.E.M.'s debut studio album, 18..., in 2009. A Mandarin version of the song, titled "Xie Bu Wan de Wen Rou", was released as part of the Taiwanese edition of the album in May 2010.

== Background ==
"Where Did U Go"
"Where Did U Go" is pop number with lyrics revolving around a breakup.

"Where Did U Go" delves into the emotions surrounding G.E.M's breakup with her first love. In the Mandarin version of the song, titled "Xie Bu Wan de Wen Rou", the lyrics narrates the story of a second love, which G.E.M. revealed was more of a figment of imagination than an actual experience.

== Commercial performance ==
"Where Did U Go" catapulted G.E.M. to fame in Hong Kong and earned the title of champion song on Hong Kong Radio. It also garnered several accolades at Hong Kong award ceremonies.

== Other versions ==
In 2010, G.E.M. released the Mandarin version of "Where Did U Go", titled "Xie Bu Wan de Wen Rou" (Chinese: 寫不完的溫柔; pinyin: Xiě bù wán de wēnróu), which she also wrote. This version was included in the Taiwanese edition of her first studio album, 18..., which was released on May 14, 2010.

== Accolades ==
Awards and nominations for "Where Did U Go"
Organization	Year	Award	Result	Ref.
Top Ten Chinese Gold Songs Awards	2009	Most Popular Singer-Songwriter Award	Nominated	
Top Ten Chinese Gold Songs Awards	2010	Song Producer Award	Won	
Jade Solid Gold Awards	2009	Top Songs	Won	
TVB8 Golden Songs Awards	2010	World's Favorite Cantonese Song Award	Won	

== Credits and personnel ==
- G.E.M. – vocals, background vocals, lyrics
- Skot Suyama – lyrics
- Mark Lui – production, arrangement

== Release history ==
Release dates and formats
Region	Date	Format	Version	Label
Various	September 15, 2008	Digital download; streaming	Original	Hummingbird Music
Various	October 27, 2009	Digital download; streaming	"Where Did U Go 2.0" (Sam Vahdat Remix)	Hummingbird Music
Various	May 14, 2010	Digital download; streaming	Mandarin version (寫不完的溫柔)	Hummingbird Music
