= Gems TV (United States) =

- Country: United States

Programming
- Picture format: 14:9 Of 16:9 and 4:3

Ownership
- Owner: Gems TV Holdings Limited

History
- Launched: November 29, 2006
- Closed: April 15, 2010

Links
- Website: www.gemstv.com

Availability At Time of Closure

Terrestrial
- Terrestrial: Channel 7 and 10

Gems TV was an American reverse auction jewelry shopping channel. The channel was available on DirecTV, Dish Network and other local networks. The channel operations were based in Reno, Nevada.

== History ==
Gems TV launched exclusively on DirecTV. On January 15, 2007, Gems TV also became available through select cable providers in the U.S. and some TV affiliates such as KLDT in Lake Dallas, Texas. The channel was also streamed live on the website. On August 30, 2007, Gems TV became available on Dish Network.

== Bankruptcy and closure ==
In March 2010, it was announced that the US operation would close and be wound down. On April 7, 2010, Gems TV USA filed for Chapter 11 bankruptcy, blaming the Great Recession. Gems TV ceased broadcasting on April 15, 2010. The website and customer service team continued operating until May 6, 2010.

== Criticism ==
On February 1, 2010, the manufacturing operations at its factory in Chanthaburi, Thailand were closed down due to the change in sourcing and manufacture. The new strategic decision to fully outsource its gemstone jewelry supply was aimed at reducing operating costs, increasing supply, improving manufacturing flexibility and the main reason of increasing profit margins. This was one of the principles the company was originally well known for - Going direct to the mines and handcrafting gem set jewelry in their own in-house facilities. The consequence of this has resulted in a large number of redundancies.

DirecTV has filed a lawsuit against Gems TV (USA) Limited, claiming that Gems TV refused to pay their satellite bills.

== See also ==
- Jewelry Television
- Gemporia
