= High-Speed SECS Message Services =

The High-Speed SECS Message Services (HSMS) protocol is a Session layer protocol for communication between production equipment and factory control systems in semiconductor factories. HSMS defines a TCP/IP based session for use with sending SECS-II messages. It is intended as a high speed alternative to the serial (RS-232 based) SECS-I protocol. HSMS is defined in the standard SEMI E37, and its subordinate standards: SEMI E37.1, and the withdrawn SEMI E37.2.

The E37 standard, labelled Generic Services defines how to establish and break a TCP/IP connection, begin and end a logical link over that connection, send data (particularly SECS-II messages), recognize error conditions, and test connection integrity. The E37.1 standard, labelled Single Selected-Session Mode (HSMS-SS) restricts E37 to scenarios involving a single connection between host and equipment, for point-to-point communication, directly replacing the use cases of SECS-I.
