= SECS-I =

Equipment communications standard

SECS-I (SEMI Equipment Communications Standard Part 1, SEMI E4) defines the transport-layer protocol for communication between semiconductor manufacturing equipment and a host computer, specifying hardware, physical, and data link details, typically over RS-232 serial links. The content and structure of messages are defined by SECS-II (SEMI E5), which enables standardized exchange of information between intelligent equipment and factory hosts. Together, these standards facilitated automation in semiconductor manufacturing, reducing manual intervention and improving efficiency. For higher-speed or networked communication, HSMS (High-Speed SECS Message Services, SEMI E37) provides a transport-layer protocol over TCP/IP networks while maintaining compatibility with SECS-II messages.
