= Gem, Texas =

Unincorporated community in Texas, US

Coordinates: 35°47′07″N 100°07′24″W

Gem is an unincorporated community in Hemphill County, Texas, United States.

== History ==
A post office called Gem was established in 1909, and remained in operation until 1954. A first settler named the community after his wife.

== Gallery ==
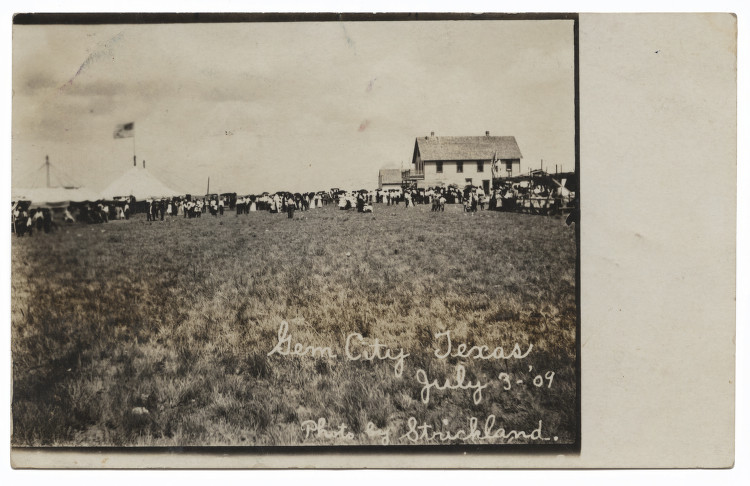
July 1909
