= Global Electronic Music Marketplace =

GEMM
- Website type: Private
- Founded: 1994; 32 years ago
- Dissolved: 2015; 11 years ago
- Headquarters: La Jolla, California, {{{location_country}}}
- Key people: Roger Raffee, CEO & Jim Hall, COO
- Industry: Online music trading
- Website: www.gemm.com (defunct)

Global Electronic Music Marketplace (GEMM) was an online music trading website established in 1994. It was founded by Co-founder & CEO, Roger Raffee and Chief Operating Officer, Jim Hall, and based in La Jolla, California, United States. Most of the items traded on the site were used CDs and LPs.

On July 8, 2015. GEMM filed for Chapter 7 bankruptcy at Southern District of California bankruptcy court

== Overview ==
GEMM's main products are second-hand or used CDs and vinyl records as well as other music collectibles listed by sellers.

Between 1996 and 2001, GEMM was the largest online music marketplace, with a sales and revenue yearly growth rate of 100% and 11 employees. By 2002, the site's inventory had grown from 250,000 to 16 million items. Similarly to trading sites such as eBay, GEMM included a five-star vendor rating system based on buyer feedback, as well as advanced search features and custom user want-lists.

=== Bankruptcy ===
GEMM filed for Chapter 7 bankruptcy at Southern District of California bankruptcy court and ceased business operations effective July 8, 2015.

== See also ==
- Discogs
