= Gem Lake (Vancouver Island) =

- Location within Vancouver Island
- Location: Vancouver Island, British Columbia
- Coordinates: 49°42′00″N 125°25′00″W
- Lake type: Natural lake
- Basin countries: Canada

Gem Lake is a lake located on Vancouver Island northeast of Mount Albert Edward on the east side of Buttle Lake, in Strathcona Provincial Park.

== See also ==
- List of lakes of British Columbia
