= Gem Glacier =

Glacier in Montana, United States

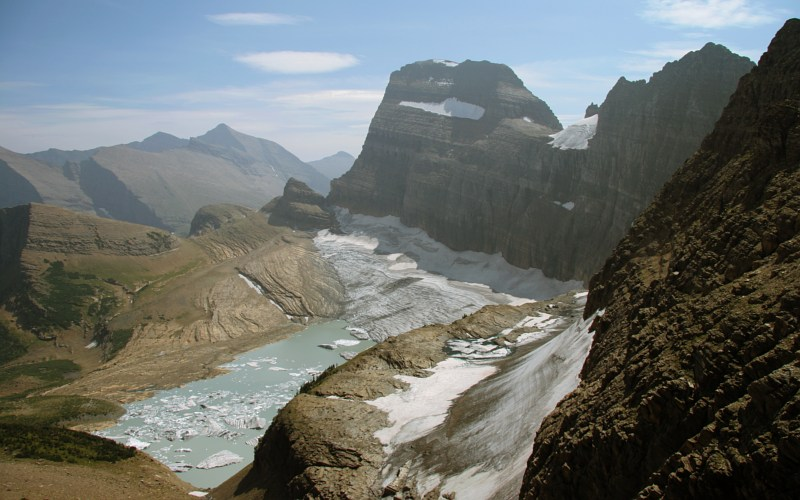
- Gem Glacier is the small snowy patch in the upper right, in the notch on the cliffs. The larger and better known Grinnell Glacier is below.

- Location within Montana
- Type: Hanging glacier
- Location: Glacier National Park, Glacier County, Montana, U.S.
- Coordinates: 48°44′48″N 113°43′40″W
- Area: 5 acres (0.020 km^{2}) in 2005
- Terminus: Cliffs
- Status: Retreating

This is Gem Glacier is the smallest glacier in Glacier National Park (U.S.). Located on the east (Glacier County) side of the Continental Divide arête known as the Garden Wall, the glacier is situated on the cliff face above the better known Grinnell Glacier. Gem Glacier is a hanging glacier, and drapes down from the north face of the steep arete to which it is attached. Gem Glacier is only 5 acres (0.020 km^{2}) in area and is far below the 25 acres (0.10 km^{2}) threshold often cited as qualifying as an active glacier. Between 1966 and 2005, Gem Glacier lost 30 percent of its acreage and Grinnell Glacier lost 40 percent.

== See also ==
- List of glaciers in the United States
- Glaciers in Glacier National Park (U.S.)
