= Gems TV (German TV channel) =

German teleshopping channel (2012)

- Country: Germany
- Broadcast area: Germany
- Headquarters: Grünwald, Germany

Programming
- Language(s): German
- Picture format: 576i (4:3 SDTV)

Ownership
- Sister channels: Channel 21

History
- Launched: 1 October 2012; 12 years ago
- Closed: 18 December 2012; 12 years ago

Links
- Website: de.gems.tv

Gems TV was a short-lived German teleshopping channel based in Grünwald near Munich, which broadcast 20 hours daily via Astra 19.2°E from 1 October 2012 to 18 December 2012. In the time from 6 am to 2 pm, the channel was also broadcast via the frequencies of Channel 21. There were offered jewelry of all kinds. The operator was GemsTV Germany GmbH, which sold on the same principle as Gems TV in the UK. Gems TV was a subsidiary of Channel 21.

On 18 December 2012, Gems TV discontinued its operation due to non-achieved sales targets. It was already the second failed attempt of Gems TV in Germany, after the first Gems TV with a new owner was merged with Juwelo TV.

== Programming ==
The products could only be purchased while they were presented by the moderator. This principle is also practiced by 1-2-3.tv and distinguishes these transmitters from other teleshopping programs such as HSE24 or QVC, in which the presented products can generally also be purchased after the presentation.

The principle resembles a descending auction with falling prices. For legal reasons, however, the correct name is "purchase against bid" (Kauf gegen Gebot), as with all teleshopping stations, since auctions are not permitted on German television.
