= Gem Theatre =

Gem Theatre or Gem Theater may refer to:

- Gem Theatre (Detroit)
- Gem Theater (Deadwood, South Dakota)
- Gem Theatre (Kannapolis, North Carolina)
- Gem Theater (New Orleans)
- Gem Theater (Pioche, Nevada)
