= Gem (automobile) =

Defunct American motor vehicle manufacturer

The Gem was an automobile manufactured in both Jackson, Michigan and Grand Rapids, Michigan by the Gem Motor Car Company from December, 1917 to 1919. The company was incorporated in December 1917, and early the next month it was announced that capitalization was to be $250,000, with $150,000 yet to be issued. The Gem was a light, assembled car with a four-cylinder G.B.&S. engine. Originally the plan was to acquire the complete chassis (from the Pontiac Chassis Company) and bodies (perhaps from Hayes) and complete the assembly of the cars in Grand Rapids. Gem planned to make some of the components itself eventually, though this appears not to have occurred. Only two models were produced, a 5-passenger touring car, selling for $845, and a light delivery van.
