= Jewellery Maker =

British jewellery shopping channel

- Country: United Kingdom
- Headquarters: Warwickshire

Programming
- Picture format: 576i (SDTV 16:9)

Ownership
- Owner: The Gemporia Partnership

History
- Launched: 4 May 2010
- Replaced: Thomas Cook TV (on Sky)

Links
- Website: www.jewellerymaker.com

Availability

Terrestrial
- Freeview (UK): Channel 72 (Jewellery Maker); Channel 73 (HobbyMaker)

Jewellery Maker is a British jewelry shopping channel launched on 4 May 2010 and is a sister channel of Sewing Quarter. The presentation and format of the channel are similar to the crafting channel Create & Craft. Jewellery Maker is available on Freesat, Freeview, Sky, and online. The channel broadcasts live from 8 am to 1 pm and rebroadcasts the live shows during downtime. The channel's website live streams all programming. The website also provides video tutorials and workshops.

With a staff of over 100 people, the channel operations and company are based at Ivy House in Studley, Warwickshire.

== History ==
Original logo used from launch until July 2010

Jewellery Maker was launched on 4 May 2010 after the Colorful Company Group purchased the Thomas Cook TV EPG slot on Sky. For the first two months, the channel only broadcast pre-recorded shows. On 7 July 2010, Jewellery Maker started to broadcast live, due to the completion of the sale involving a rival channel Gems TV. Jewellery Maker used the former Rocks TV studio, after it moved into the former Gems TV 2 studio, following the acquisition of Gems TV UK Limited.

On 10 August 2010, Jewellery Maker launched on Freesat channel 807. On 8 September 2010, the channel also launched on Virgin Media channel 756, replacing Gems TV 2. On 1 January 2022, the channel was removed from Virgin Media, which the channel classified as a “Personal Decision” for its removal.

In 2015 the Immediate Media Company acquired Jewellery Maker from the Genuine Gemstone Company, adding to Immediate's Craft and Arts portfolio.

=== Freeview ===
Following the acquisition of a 24-hour Freeview slot for Gems TV in 2011, Jewellery Maker began to broadcast on Freeview channel 43 during its live hours (9 am - 1 pm), as Gems TV was broadcast as a teleshopping block on 5* during this period; channel 43 relayed Gems TV between 1 pm and 9 am.

=== The Late Show ===
As of 1 March 2012, the channel also broadcasts live from 5 pm to 9 pm in what is billed as "The Late Show". As Gems TV was (and is) using Freeview 43 at these times, The Late Show was only broadcast on Jewellery Maker's dedicated satellite and cable channels.

From the DTT platform at the start of November 2013, the shopping channel Marketplace (on Freeview channel 50) increased its broadcast hours to provide a round-the-clock shopping service, following the removal of the BT Sport Preview promotional channel and the remaining Top Up TV services. TGGC leased a four-hour programming block on this station to allow the Jewellery Maker Late Show to be simulcast. Marketplace is not broadcast as a channel on satellite or cable platforms.

The cessation of Marketplace in February 2014 means Jewellery Maker has reverted to its prior day-show-only service on Freeview.

== HobbyMaker ==
HobbyMaker is a sister channel to Jewellery Maker. It is broadcast on Freeview channel 73 and Virgin Media channel 754.
