= QVC Germany =

QVC
- QVC Logo
- Country: Germany
- Headquarters: Düsseldorf, Germany

Ownership
- Owner: QVC Deutschland Inc. & Co. KG; QVC Handel GmbH; QVC eDistribution Inc.; QVC Studio GmbH; eQVC GmbH; QVC Call Center GmbH & Co KG; QVC eService Inc. & Co KG

History
- Launched: December 1, 1996

Links
- Website: http://www.qvc.de

Availability

Terrestrial
- DVB-T2 (Germany): different federal channels (FTA)

Streaming media
- QVC.de

QVC Germany is a branch of QVC, a multinational corporation specialising in televised home shopping, originally founded in 1986 by Joseph Segel in West Chester, Pennsylvania. It expanded into Germany in 1996. QVC broadcasts in four major countries to 141 million consumers. The name is an initialism—standing for "Quality, Value, Convenience".

With a market share of 50%, QVC is one of the 10 largest mail-order companies in Germany. QVC is spread over four locations: Düsseldorf in Hafen, with the administration, purchasing and studio; Hückelhoven with the distribution center, Kassel and Bochum with the QVC call center.

== History ==
The program is received in 37.5 million households in Germany and Austria via cable and satellite. In addition, QVC's product range since 2002, has been available via the Internet across Europe. In Germany, QVC began its program with a daily eight-hour live broadcasts and since 1 October 2003 24 hours live. Only from 14:00 Christmas Eve until 9:00 Christmas Day are repeats aired instead of live broadcasts. Since March 1, 2010 QVC Germany broadcast in the ratio 16:9. Since March 16, 2012 starting QVC Germany, Channel two "QVC Beauty & Style".

Starting with September 1, 2010 QVC uses the "Q Logo" which is used for few years in the United States and has an additional channel "QVC Plus".

On November 29, 2013, QVC reduced its live programming to 17 hours a day, from 7am to midnight. 35 jobs were affected as a consequence.

On April 15, 2026, parent company QVC Group warned that it was preparing to file for Chapter 11 bankruptcy as soon as the end of that day, citing steadily viewer declines and debt burdens. QVC Group plans to enter a prepackaged restructuring support agreement with its creditors and exit Chapter 11 bankruptcy within no later than 90 days, or by around July 2026. On April 16, QVC Group filed for Chapter 11 bankruptcy protection in the United States District Court for the Southern District of Texas with plans to reduce over $5 billion in long-term debt, which will allow for the company to continue operating while having over $1 billion in debt remaining.

== Awards ==
In October 2005, QVC received the "consignor of the year" from Federation of German mail e. V.
