= Lake Gem (Florida) =

- Location within Florida Location within the United States
- Location: Winter Haven, Florida
- Coordinates: 28.0339°N 81.7112°W
- Type: Natural freshwater lake
- Basin countries: United States
- Max. length: 475 feet (145 m)
- Max. width: 425 feet (130 m)
- Surface area: 3.15 acres (1.27 ha)
- Surface elevation: 138 feet (42 m)

Lake Gem is a round lake on the north side of Winter Haven, Florida, United States. It is tiny and has a surface area of 3.15-acre (12,700 m^{2}). On its north side is residential housing. On its east, west and south, it is bordered by trees. It is just north of the Polk State College campus. 11th Street Northeast passes 50 feet (15 m) to the east of Lake Gem.

Lake Gem has no public boat ramp or swimming beach. The only public access is along the strip of land bordering 11th Street. The Hook and Bullet website says Lake Gem contains largemouth bass, bluegill and crappie.
