= Gems TV (UK) =

British shopping television channel

Gems TV (Gemporia)
- Country: United Kingdom
- Headquarters: Worcestershire

Programming
- Picture format: 576i (SDTV 16:9)

Ownership
- Owner: Gemporia Ltd (The Gemporia Partnership)
- Sister channels: Jewellery Maker; Shopping Quarter; G3 TV

History
- Launched: 8 October 2004
- Replaced: FO Factory Outlet (Gems TV); Snatch It! (Gems TV 2)
- Former names: Gems.tv (2004–2005); Gems TV Gold (2005); Gems TV (2005–2008); GemsTV 1 (2008–2010)

Links
- Website: www.gems.tv

Availability

Terrestrial
- Freeview: Channel 45

Gemporia is a British television and online retailer, licensed by Ofcom under the Gems TV name. The channel is mostly concerned with selling jewellery with a few lifestyle products from the homeware and beauty categories promoted in various slots across the schedule. The channel is available on Sky, Virgin Media, Freesat, Freeview and online. The channel operations are based at Eagle Road Studios in Redditch, near Birmingham. As of February 2023, the channel broadcast 24 hours a day, live between the hours of 07:00-23:00 on television, via the GEMPORIA mobile app, and online at gemporia.com. The business derives from Gems TV in Thailand.

== History ==
Gems TV is a British reverse auction jewellery shopping channel, officially the first reverse auction in the UK and was known as the first British channel just to sell gemstones.

Gems TV first launched at 4 pm on 8 October 2004, after the channel was formed by Steve Bennett and founders of Eagle Road Studios and Thaigems. The channel replaced Factory Outlet on Sky channel 663. The reverse auction format for the channel was based around Eagle Road Studios now defunct sister channel, 'Snatch It!'.

The channel was an independent company until the merger of Eagle Road Studios and Thaigem, which formed 'Gems TV UK Limited'; the original founders left the company and in 2008 floated on the Singapore Stock Exchange and become a corporate company; Gems TV Holdings Limited.

The channel's original purpose was to sell affordable gemstone jewellery manufactured by its production facilities in Chanthaburi, Thailand. To reduce costs the parent company later reduced its own manufacturing and bought in jewellery from other suppliers.

On 1 February 2010, the manufacturing operations at the company's factory in Chanthaburi, Thailand were closed down to reduce costs and increase profit margins. This caused many employees to be made redundant.

=== Sale ===
On 18 June 2010, Gems TV Holdings sold Gems TV (UK) Limited (a wholly owned subsidiary) to The Colourful Company Group Limited for £3 million. As a result of the sale, Gems TV (UK) Limited was again under the ownership of Steve Bennett, one of the original founders of the company.

After the sale of Gems TV to its original management, the channel returned to sourcing gemstone jewellery.

As of 2013, the channel was available for 24 hours a day, increased from 6 am to 2 am in 2012.

== Channels and hours ==
On 21 July 2010, Gems TV began broadcasting on Fiver again and available on Freeview, where it had ceased broadcasting on 16 June 2010 before the sale of Gems TV UK Limited to The Colourful Company Group.

On 27 July 2010, Gems TV received an LCN slot on Freeview channel 43, timeshared with Quest on Mux A, in addition to the simulcast on Fiver. The channel extended its broadcasting hours from 8 am-2 am to 6 am-2 am. Hours were later increased to 24 hours a day, and live auctions are broadcast on Freeview 43 between 1 am and 11 am. On 31 October 2010, Gems TV ceased simulcasting as part of the teleshopping block on Fiver.

On 20 February 2011, Gems TV began simulcasting on STV in Scotland, under the name of Genuine Gemstone Jewellery. The teleshopping block was transmitted for 1 hour, from midnight.

On 24 February 2011, Gems TV temporarily secured airtime on The Big Deal which was broadcasting for 24 hours a day in post-digital switchover areas, and from 5 to 6 am in pre-digital switchover areas. Broadcasting hours expanded to 24 hours in the remaining parts of the UK on 2 March 2011, when an eighth full stream was created on Mux C. The broadcasts on The Big Deal ended in April 2011.

On 30 June 2011, Gems TV began broadcasting 24 hours a day on Freeview channel 43 after acquiring a new stream on Mux C. As the main Gems TV service was available to Freeview users on 5* between 9 am and 1 pm through a commercial arrangement with Channel 5, channel 43 transmitted Jewellery Maker between 9 am and 1 pm and Gems TV at other times. The arrangement was later switched such that the 5* block carried Jewellery Maker and channel 43 carried Gems TV at all times.

On 4 November 2020, the channel moved to channel 44 on Freeview as part of a move up where every channel from channel 24 to 54 on the platform moved up one place to allow BBC Four to move to channel 24 in Scotland due to new Ofcom rules regarding certain PSB channels requiring greater prominence on EPGs.

As of February 2023, as part of a wider business review and restructure, GEMPORIA took the decision to reduce their live broadcasting hours to 07:00-23:00 daily, playing repeats of shows from earlier in day during the hours of 23:00-07:00.

== Sister channels ==
In addition to the service licensed as Gems TV, The Gemporia Partnership has a number of other channels:

=== Jewellery Maker ===
Jewellery Maker was the first new sister channel since Gems TV and Rocks TV merged. The channel was launched on 1 May 2010, selling jewellery-making kits at fixed prices, the first channel of its kind in the UK. As of 2013 the channel was broadcast live from 9 am to 1 pm and 5 pm to 9 pm daily, with its shows rebroadcast during its downtime. From February 2014, Jewellery Maker now has three shows a day the morning show 9 am -1 pm the designer inspirations show 1 pm -5 pm and the evening show 5 pm-9 pm, designer inspirations are repeated throughout the night from 9 pm -09.00 am or you can watch the shows on YouTube along with having a channel on the same site.

In 2022, the channel is broadcast part-time on Freeview channel 71 between 8 am and 1 pm (which will become Freeview channel 72 on 26 January 2022) with the programming continuing on Shopping Quarter until Gemporia Lifestyle comes on air.

=== Gemporia Lifestyle ===
Gemporia Lifestyle was launched on 8 July 2020 and can be found as a segment on the Shopping Quarter service run by The Gemporia Partnership on Freeview channel 72 (which will become Freeview channel 73 on 26 January 2022) from 5 pm each night The channel features presenters such as Hattie Greenwood, Kati Elliott and Toby Cavill selling homeware, fashion and beauty products as well as Gemporia founder Steve Bennett who sells products such as shampoos, pet care and vitamins.

=== Gem Collector ===
Gem Collector was launched on 8 October 2010. The channel shared the same studio as Jewellery Maker and broadcast live reverse auctions of loose gemstones between 7 pm and 12 am daily. Like Jewellery Maker, it was the first channel of its kind in the UK.

On 31 December 2010, Gem Collector ceased broadcasting as a separate channel and merged with Rocks TV to create Gems TV Extra, which relaunched on 2 January 2011. The Gem Collector brand is still used on Gems TV Extra for branded hour programmes.

Under the former management and ownership of Gems TV Holdings, Gems TV did have 2 sister channels, named Gems TV 2 and often referred to as Deals Of The Day and, until November 2009, a second sister channel, Gems TV 3.

As of January 2022, Gem Collector can be found as a part-time channel on the Shopping Quarter service.

=== Former sister channels ===
==== Gems TV 2 ====
Gems TV 2 launched on 12 May 2005, after replacing Gems TV's former sister channel, Snatch It!. During the closing down of Snatch It!, it was announced that the new channel was going to be called Gems TV Silver, after a successful trial of sterling silver jewellery a few months previous. However, it wasn't until launch that it was decided that Gems TV would become known as Gems TV Gold and the new channel to be simply known as Gems TV. After a few months into the new venture, it became apparent that the venture wasn't as successful as Gems TV Gold. It was then decided Gems TV Gold reverted to Gems TV and the second channel becoming known as Gems TV 2 and that both channels would show a mixture of gold and sterling silver jewellery. Since launch, the channel has used the same reverse auction format as Gems TV 1 and broadcast live between 8 am and 2 am. In late 2008/early 2009, the channel reduced its live hours to 3 pm to 11 pm. During its downtime, it simulcasted Gems TV 3. It was not until 2009 that Gems TV was officially referred to as Gems TV 1 and its hours were extended to 7 am to 2 am, despite the reduction of the live broadcasting hours on Gems TV 2.

On 31 July 2009, Gems TV 2 ceased all live output and moved the pre-recorded 'Deal Of The Day' material from Gems TV 3 to Gems TV 2. It was then often referred to as the 'Deals Of The Day' channel. Officially, Gems TV 2 ceased broadcasting in January 2010, after the channel began simulcasting Gems TV 1.

On 8 September 2010, Gems TV 2 was replaced with Jewellery Maker on Virgin Media channel 756.

On 8 October 2010, Gems TV 2 ceased simulcasting Gems TV and was replaced by the new Coloured Rocks channel; Gem Collector.

Gems TV 2 was previously only available on Sky, Virgin Media and via a live stream on the Gems TV website.

==== Gems TV 3 ====
Gems TV 3, known on air as 'Deal(s) Of The Day', was transmitted only on Sky 670 and relaunched on 14 January 2009. The channel was launched using the original Gems TV 2 EPG slot after Gems TV had previously purchased a 3rd EPG slot in the Shopping section of the EPG of 642 from TV Warehouse 1. The company then moved both Gems TV 1 and Gems TV 2 up the EPG from 646 and 660 to 642 and 646 before Sky reshuffled the Shopping section and moved all the channels down 10 slots to make more room in the Kids section. The Deal of the Day format was previously available between 2004 and 2005. Its format was different from its sister channels. Gems TV 3 used a fixed priced format to show a number pieces of jewellery for 24 hours, on a loop from 8 am till 8 am the following day or until the stock had run out. The channel was simulcast on Gems TV 2 when its live reverse auctions were off air, allowing the channels content to be available to Virgin Media viewers. A live stream was also available on the website. The channel was also known as the 'Deal Of The Day' channel.

On 1 August 2009, Gems TV 3 started replicating Gems TV 1 24 hours a day, and the 'Deal Of The Day' content moved over to Gems TV 2. On 2 November 2009, Gems TV 3 was removed from Sky channel 670.

==== TGGC Outlet ====
TGGC Outlet was first launched in July 2008 as Rocks TV. The channel used the same reverse auction format as Gems TV. Until 18 June 2010 the channel was competed with Gems TV. On 2 January 2011, Rocks TV was rebranded as Gems TV Extra and the channel also merged with Gem Collector. The channel relaunched as TGGC Outlet on 15 December 2012. The channel broadcast live auctions between 11 am and 7 pm. The channel was available on Sky channel 656 and online until 15 July 2013.
