= Gemporia =

British online jewellery retailer

- Headquarters: Redditch, United Kingdom

Programming
- Picture format: 480i (SD widescreen)

Ownership
- Owner: Gemporia Partnership Ltd
- Sister channels: Gems TV

History
- Launched: 8 October 2004
- Former names: The Genuine Gemstone Company, Rocks TV, Coloured Rocks

Links
- Website: gemporia.com

Gemporia is a British television and online jewellery retailer. The main television channel operated by the business is Gems TV, a reverse auction jewellery shopping channel, the first dedicated reverse auction channel in the UK. The channel is accessed through free-to-view satellite and terrestrial television, a dedicated mobile app, and a website. The channel operations are based at Eagle Road Studios in Redditch, near Birmingham.

== Gems TV ==
Gems TV first launched at 4pm on 8 October 2004, after the channel was formed by the five founders of Eagle Road Studios and Thaigem. The channel replaced Factory Outlet on Sky channel 663. The reverse auction format for the channel was based around Eagle Road Studios now defunct sister channel, 'Snatch It!'.

The channel was an independent company until the merger of Eagle Road Studios and Thaigem, which formed 'Gems TV UK Limited'. The original founders left the company and in 2008 it was floated on the Singapore Stock Exchange and become a corporate company; Gems TV Holdings Limited.

The channel's original purpose was to sell affordable gemstone jewellery manufactured by its production facilities in Chanthaburi, Thailand. To reduce costs the parent company later reduced its own manufacturing and bought in jewellery from other suppliers.

In January 2014, a presenter was awarded a payout after being fired. Charlie Vernon was broadcast displaying an obscene hand gesture after being sexually harassed by colleagues through her earpiece. Her claim for unfair dismissal however was rejected by the Birmingham employment tribunal.

In 2017, the company became majority employee-owned.

== Gemporia US ==
Gemporia US (formerly known as Rocks TV) is a former American reverse auction jewellery shopping channel which formerly was carried on American cable and satellite providers. The channel was launched on July 12, 2012, as Rocks TV, and operated from the United Kingdom from Gemporia's studios in Redditch, sharing Gems TV personnel. On December 1, 2015, Rocks TV was rebranded as Gemporia US.

The network was mainly available via DirecTV via a purchased channel slot, along with the paid programming channels of various cable providers. It was discontinued on December 5, 2016, when it ended traditional wireline distribution to convert to an online-only model.

== Gemporia.com ==
Gemporia launched a new website in August 2013, where customers can browse and buy jewellery, read up on the history of jewellery and gemstones, and watch web feeds of Gemporia's output.

== Sister channels ==
In addition to the service licensed as Gems TV, The Gemporia Partnership has a number of other channels:

=== Jewellery Maker ===
Jewellery Maker was the first new sister channel since Gems TV and Rocks TV merged. The channel was launched on 1 May 2010, selling jewellery-making kits at fixed prices, the first channel of its kind in the UK. As of 2013 the channel was broadcast live from 9am to 1pm and 5pm to 9pm daily, with its shows rebroadcast during its downtime. From February 2014, Jewellery Maker now has three shows a day: the morning show (9am – 1pm), the designer inspirations show (1pm – 5pm), and the evening show (5pm – 9pm). Designer inspirations are repeated throughout the night from 9pm – 9am or you can watch the shows on YouTube, along with having a channel on the same site.

In 2022, the channel is broadcast part-time on Freeview channel 71 between 8am and 1pm (which will become Freeview channel 72 on 26 January 2022) with the programming continuing on Shopping Quarter until Gemporia Lifestyle comes on air.

=== Gemporia Lifestyle ===
Gemporia Lifestyle was launched on 8 July 2020, closing 20 February 2023, and could be found as a segment on the Shopping Quarter service run by The Gemporia Partnership on Freeview channel 72 (which will become Freeview channel 73 on 26 January 2022) from 5pm each night. The channel features presenters such as Hattie Greenwood, Kati Elliott and Toby Cavill selling homeware, fashion and beauty products as well as Gemporia founder Steve Bennett who sells products such as shampoos, pet care and vitamins.

=== Gem Collector ===
Gem Collector was launched on 8 October 2010. The channel shared the same studio as Jewellery Maker and broadcast live reverse auctions of loose gemstones between 7pm and 12am daily. Like Jewellery Maker, it was the first channel of its kind in the UK.

On 31 December 2010, Gem Collector ceased broadcasting as a separate channel and merged with Rocks TV to create Gems TV Extra, which relaunched on 2 January 2011. The Gem Collector brand is still used on Gems TV Extra for branded hour programmes.

Under the former management and ownership of Gems TV Holdings, Gems TV did have 2 sister channels, named Gems TV 2 and often referred to as Deals Of The Day and, until November 2009, a second sister channel, Gems TV 3.

As of January 2022, Gem Collector can be found as a part-time channel on the Shopping Quarter service.
