= G.E.M. discography =

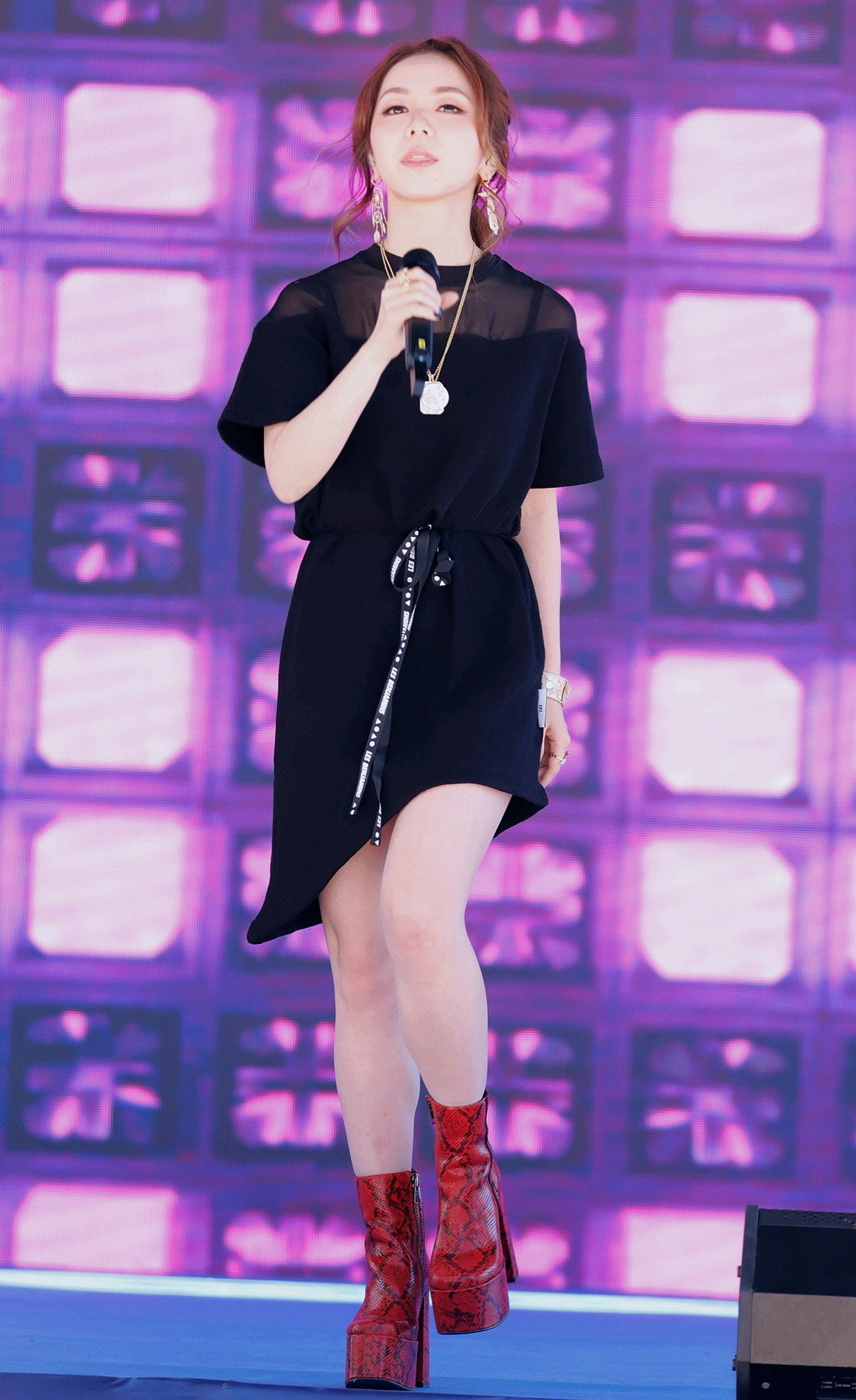
- G.E.M. in 2018
- Studio albums: 7
- EPs: 6
- Live albums: 2
- Compilation albums: 1
- Singles: 42

The discography of Chinese and Hong Kong singer-songwriter G.E.M. (simplified Chinese: 邓紫棋; traditional Chinese: 鄧紫棋) consists of six studio albums, one re-recorded album, two live albums, one compilation album, five extended play, and twenty-six singles. She made her debut under Hummingbird Music with the Cantonese extended play G.E.M. in October 2008, which topped the Hong Kong album chart and sold over 100,000 copies. It featured the single "Where Did U Go", which was re-recorded in Mandarin as "Xie Bu Wan De Wen Rou" the following year.

Her first studio album, 18..., was released in October 2009 to commercial success, and spawned singles such as "A.I.N.Y" and "All About U". My Secret, released in October 2010, and Xposed, released in June 2012, both reached number one on the Hong Kong album chart. Xposed was the highest-selling Mandarin album of the year and featured the hit single "Bubble", which experienced a resurgence in popularity after she performed the song on I Am a Singer 2 in January 2014. Later that year, G.E.M. released a cover of Beyond's 1988 song "Like You", prompted by popular demand following her performance of the song on the same show.

G.E.M. released her first compilation album The Best of 2008–2012 in 2013, which peaked at number one on the Sino Chart in China and number two in Hong Kong. Her subsequent records, Heartbeat (2015) and 25 Looks (2016) were also named the highest-selling Mandarin album of the year at the IFPI Hong Kong Record Sales Awards. Heartbeat featured six singles, including the titular single "Heartbeat", "Goodbye", and "Away". Her 2016 single "Light Years Away" reached number one on the Billboard Radio China Top 10 chart and became the most-viewed music video by a Chinese artist on YouTube.

The 2018 singles "Tik Tok" and "Woke," part of her Fairytale EP trilogy, both went on to top the Billboard Radio China chart. The trilogy's songs were later compiled into the album Happily Ever After, which was released in May 2019 as her final record under Hummingbird. Her sixth album City Zoo, was released in December 2019 under G.E.M.'s self-founded agency G Nation. It sold over 200,000 copies in China and was certified gold by the Recording Industry Association Singapore (RIAS) for surpassing sales of 5,000 units. Her seventh studio album was released in two languages: in Mandarin as Revelation (2022) and in Spanish as Revelación (2023).

In June 2025, she released her first re-recorded album, I Am Gloria, featuring tracks from her earlier albums that were released while she was under contract with Hummingbird music.

== Albums ==
=== Studio albums ===
List of studio albums, showing selected details, sales, and certifications
Title	Album details	Peak chart positions		Sales	Certifications
Title	Album details	HK	TWN	Sales	Certifications
18...	Released: 27 October 2009; Label: Hummingbird; Format: CD, digital download	—	18		
My Secret	Released: 28 October 2010; Label: Hummingbird; Format: CD, digital download	1	—		
Xposed	Released: 5 July 2012; Label: Hummingbird; Format: CD, digital download	1	—		
Heartbeat (新的心跳)	Released: 6 November 2015; Label: Hummingbird; Format: CD, digital download, LP	1	1		
Happily Ever After (童話的休止符)	Released: 10 May 2019; Label: Hummingbird; Format: CD	1	5		
City Zoo (摩天動物園)	Released: 27 December 2019; Label: Sony Music Entertainment Taiwan; Format: CD, digital download, LP	1	1	CHN: 200,000; SGP: 5,000 (Note: Sales figures are based on certification alone.)	RIAS: Gold
Revelation (啓示錄)	Released: 23 September 2022; Re-released (Revelación): 10 July 2023; Label: Warner Music Taiwan; Format: CD, digital download, LP	1	1		
"—" denotes releases that did not chart, were not released in that region, or chart did not exist.

=== Live albums ===
List of live albums
Title	Album details
Get Everybody Moving Concert	Released: 26 November 2011; Label: Hummingbird; Format: DVD/Blu-ray
X.X.X. Live	Released: 6 November 2013; Label: Hummingbird; Format: CD, DVD/Blu-ray

=== Compilation albums ===
List of compilation albums, showing selected details
Title	Album details	Peak chart positions	
Title	Album details	CHN	HK
The Best of 2008–2012	Released: 27 March 2013; Label: Hummingbird; Format: CD, digital download	1	2

=== Re-recorded albums ===
List of re-recorded albums, showing selected details
Title	Album details
I Am Gloria	Released: 12 June 2025; Label: Sony Music Entertainment Taiwan; Format: digital download

== Extended plays ==
List of extended plays, showing selected details
Title	Details	Peak chart positions	Sales
Title	Details	HK	Sales
G.E.M.	Released: 15 October 2008; Label: Hummingbird; Format: CD, digital download	1	HK: 100,000
25 Looks	Released: 30 September 2016; Label: Hummingbird; Format: Digital download	—	
My Fairytale (另一個童話)	Released: 30 August 2018; Label: Hummingbird; Format: Digital download	—	
Fearless (毒蘋果)	Released: 9 November 2018; Label: Hummingbird; Format: Digital download	—	
Queen G (睡皇后)	Released: 28 December 2018; Label: Hummingbird; Format: Digital download	—	
T.I.M.E	Released: 26 November 2023; Label: Sony Music Taiwan; Format: Digital download, streaming	—	

== Singles ==
=== As lead artist ===
==== 2000s ====
List of singles released in the 2000s
Title	Year	Album
"Where Did U Go"	2008	G.E.M.
"Sleeping Beauty" (睡公主)	2008	G.E.M.
"All About U"	2009	18...
"A.I.N.Y" (愛你)	2009	18...
"Mascara" (煙燻妝)	2009	18...

==== 2010s ====
List of singles released in the 2010s
Title	Year	Peak chart positions					Album
Title	Year	CHN Air. (Note: The Billboard Radio China chart operated from 2015 to 2019.)	CHN TME	CHN Top (Note: The Billboard China Top 100 chart operated from January to September 2019.)	MLY CHN (Note: The Official Southeast Asia Charts chart launched on 27 January 2025.)	SGP Reg.	Album
"Arrietty's Song" (亞莉亞蒂之歌)	2010	—	—	—	—	—	Arrietty theme song
"My Secret" (我的秘密)	2010	—	—	—	—	—	My Secret
"Someday I'll Fly"	2012	—	—	—	—	—	Xposed
"What Have U Done"	2012	—	—	—	—	—	Xposed
"Oh Boy"	2012	—	—	—	—	—	Xposed
"Bubble" (泡沫)	2012	—	—	—	—	—	Xposed
"Intoxicated" (你把我灌醉)	2013	—	—	—	—	—	The Best of 2008–2012
"Like You" (喜歡你)	2014	—	—	—	—	—	Non-album single
"Long Distance" (多遠都要在一起)	2015	—	—	—	10	—	Heartbeat
"One Way Road" (單行的軌道)	2015	—	—	—	—	—	Heartbeat
"Heartbeat" (新的心跳)	2015	—	—	—	—	—	Heartbeat
"Moment" (瞬間)	2015	—	—	—	—	—	Heartbeat
"Goodbye" (再見)	2015	4	—	—	—	—	Heartbeat
"Away" (來自天堂的魔鬼)	2015	5	—	—	—	20	Heartbeat
"A Man of Intention" (有心人)	2016	—	—	—	—	—	Non-album single
"Light Years Away" (光年之外)	2016	1	—	39	—	25	Passengers theme song
"Peach Blossom Promise" (桃花諾)	2017	1	—	—	—	—	A Life Time Love OST
"Tik Tok" (倒数)	2018	1	1	2	—	15	My Fairytale
"Woke" (那一夜)	2018	1	2	42	—	—	Fearless
"Love Finds A Way" (岩石里的花)	2018	—	1	30	—	—	Queen G
"Miss Similar" (差不多姑娘)	2019	2	9	1	—	—	City Zoo
"Walk on Water"	2019	—	11	—	—	—	City Zoo
"Full Stop" (句号)	2019	—	1	—	—	9	City Zoo
"City Zoo" (摩天动物园)	2019	—	10	—	—	—	City Zoo
"Selfless" (透明)	2019	—	4	—	—	—	City Zoo
"—" denotes releases that did not chart, chart did not exist, or was not released in that region.

==== 2020s ====
List of singles released in the 2020s
Title	Year	Peak chart positions			Album
Title	Year	CHN TME	MLY CHN	SGP Reg.	Album
"Angels" (平凡天使)	2020	3	—	—	Non-album singles
"Loneliness" (孤独)	2021	4	—	—	Non-album singles
"Parallel" (平行世界)	2021	7	—	—	Non-album singles
"Superpower" (超能力)	2021	4	—	—	Non-album singles
"Double You" (兩個你)	2021	5	—	—	Non-album singles
"Gloria"	2022	26	—	—	Revelation
"Hell"	2022	29	—	—	Revelation
"Man Who Laughs" (你不是第一個離開的人)	2022	15	—	—	Revelation
"Ice Age" (冰河时代)	2022	22	—	—	Revelation
"The End of the Night" (夜的盡頭)	2022	65	—	—	Revelation
"The Sky" (天空没有极限)	2022	68	—	—	Revelation
"The One and Only" (唯一)	2023	55	4	—	T.I.M.E
"—" denotes releases that did not chart, or was not released in that region.

=== Promotional singles ===
List of promotional singles
Title	Year	Peak chart positions		Album
Title	Year	CHN TME	CHN Top	Album
"Cheer Up!"	2009	—	—	Non-album singles
"Love the Moment"	2011	—	—	Non-album singles
"Joy Everywhere"	2012	—	—	Non-album singles
"Sun in the Pupil"	2016	—	—	Non-album singles
"Crossfire"	2017	—	—	Non-album singles
"Victoria"	2017	—	—	Non-album singles
"Our Dream"	2018	—	—	Non-album singles
"For the Love of It" (热爱就一起) (with Jackson Wang)	2019	14	41	Non-album singles
"I Say"	2019	9	—	Non-album singles
"Long After" (很久以後)	2020	52	—	City Zoo
"Sacrifice"	2025	42	—	Non-album single

== Other charted songs ==
List of other charted songs
Title	Year	Peak chart positions			Album
Title	Year	CHN Air.	CHN TME	CHN Top	Album
"Sometimes"	2013	—	—	—	Live Piano Session
"Song For You"	2016	—	—	—	Live Piano Session II
"Drawing" (畫)	2016	9	—	—	Live Piano Session II
"My Fairytale" (另一个童话)	2018	—	10	22	My Fairytale
"Rightfully Wrong" (错过不错)	2018	—	21	—	My Fairytale
"Unexpectedly" (突然之间)	2018	—	15	25	Fearless
"Fearless" (毒苹果)	2018	—	18	38	Fearless
"Queen G" (睡皇后)	2018	—	7	8	Queen G
"Why"	2018	—	36	—	Queen G
"Fly Away"	2019	—	28	—	City Zoo
"Missing You" (好想好想你)	2019	—	45	—	City Zoo
"Still That Girl" (依然睡公主)	2019	—	88	—	City Zoo
"11"	2023	—	63	—	T.I.M.E

== Collaborations ==
Title	Year	Peak chart positions		Album
Title	Year	CHN TME	SGP Reg.	Album
"Drinking, Smoking & Swearing" (with Jan Lamb)	2009	—	—	18...
"Collaboration Song" (with Justin Lo)	2010	—	—	I Never Changed Love Addiction
"Beautiful" (手心的薔薇) (with JJ Lin)	2015	—	26	Genesis
"Don't Force It" (别勉强) (featuring Eric Chou)	2019	84	14	City Zoo
"Still Breathing" (with Faouzia and Illenium)	2025	—	—	Non-album single

== Soundtrack appearances ==
Title	Year	Film / series	Note
"Arrietty's Song"	2010	Arietty	Cantonese version
"Butterflies Linger the Flowers"	2012	Demi-Gods and Semi-Devils	
"The Continent"	2014	The Continent	Mandarin Version of "The End of the World"
"Light Years Away"	2016	Passenger	Mandarin theme song
"Peach Blossom Promise"	2017	A Life Time Love	
"Burning Heart"	2017	Princess Agents	
"Trophy Boy"	2018	Charming	featuring Ashley Tisdale and Avril Lavigne
"Bang Bang"	2022	Minions: The Rise of Gru	Mandarin version of Bang Bang (My Baby Shot Me Down)

== Compositions for other singers ==
Title	Year	Artist	Album
"Nu Er Xiong"	2010	Gigi Leung	Pa Ji Mo De Mao
"Mother Earth"	2011	Stephanie Cheng	Spring/Summer 2011
"Broken"	2019	Coco Lee	You & I
