= List of G.E.M. live performances =

G.E.M. live performances
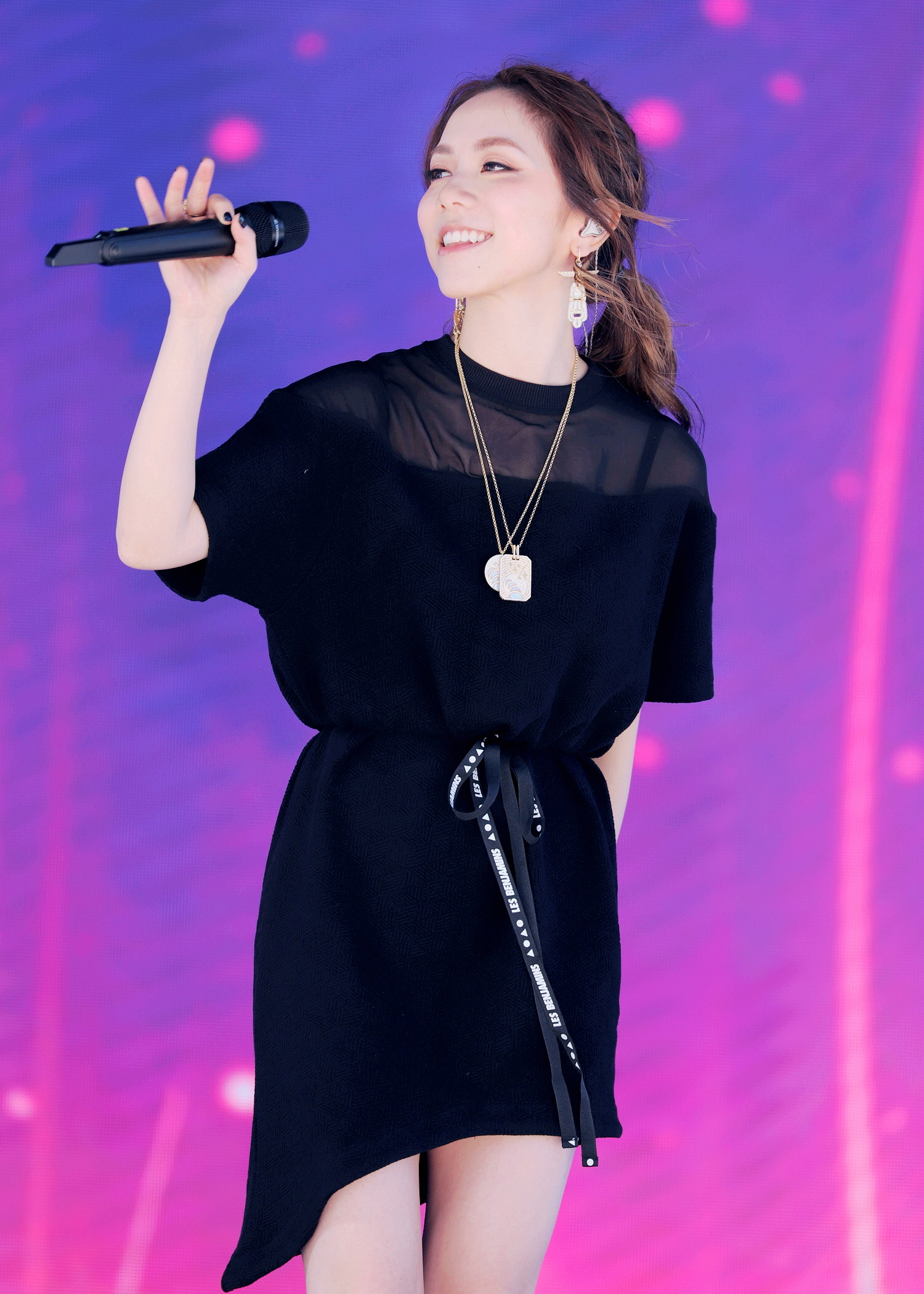
- G.E.M. in 2018
- Concert tours: 4
- One-off concerts: 8

Chinese and Hong Kong singer-songwriter G.E.M. held her first solo concert in 2008. Since 2011, she has embarked on four world tours for a total of over 235 shows. Her first concert tour, billed as the Get Everybody Moving Concert, began with three consecutive shows at the Hong Kong Coliseum in May 2011, making her the youngest singer to have held a solo concert at the venue. It continued with performances in Asia, Australia, and North America for a total of 14 shows.

She expanded the scope during her next tour, with the X.X.X. Live Tour spanning 73 shows across Asia, Oceania, North America, and Europe. It attracted over 800,000 people in total. G.E.M.'s third world tour, the Queen of Hearts World Tour, began in April 2017 and spanned 48 shows in Asia, Oceania, and North America. Due to the termination of her contract with Hummingbird Music in March 2019, however, the tour was cut short and concluded in Kaohsiung, Taiwan the following month.

Her next world tour, the I Am Gloria World Tour, began in December 2023 in mainland China and broke numerous records, including the largest and the most-attended tour by a Chinese female singer. It saw major financial success, grossing US$424 million (HK$3.3 billion) in ticket revenue across 86 shows by March 2025, becoming the highest-grossing tour by an Asian female artist and the fourth highest-grossing tour by a female recording artist of all-time, surpassing Madonna's Sticky & Sweet Tour.

G.E.M.'s concerts have received positive reviews from various publications including The Straits Times, who during her second world tour in 2015, praised her as "powerful singer" who also showcases "her musicality on the guitar, drums and piano". Her concert at the Singapore National Stadium in March 2025 became the highest attended show by solo female Mandopop singer in the venue's history, attracting approximately 42,000 people.

== Concert tours ==
Title	Date(s)	Associated album(s)	Continent(s)	Shows	Attendance	Gross	Ref.
Get Everybody Moving Concert	May 14, 2011 – December 2, 2012	18... My Secret	Asia; Oceania; North America	14	—	—	
X.X.X. Live Tour	April 12, 2013 – November 22, 2015	Xposed	Asia; Oceania; North America; Europe	73	800,000	—	
Queen of Hearts World Tour	April 1, 2017 – April 28, 2019	Heartbeat	Asia; Oceania; North America	48	—	—	
I Am Gloria World Tour	December 7, 2023 – October 5, 2026	Revelation	Asia; Europe; North America	182	3,000,000	$424,000,000	

=== Get Everybody Moving Concert ===
Date	City	Country	Venue	Attendance
May 14, 2011	Hong Kong		Hong Kong Coliseum	—
May 15, 2011	Hong Kong		Hong Kong Coliseum	—
May 16, 2011	Hong Kong		Hong Kong Coliseum	—
August 27, 2011	Sydney	Australia	Sydney Entertainment Centre	—
September 9, 2011	Hong Kong		Hong Kong Coliseum	—
September 10, 2011	Hong Kong		Hong Kong Coliseum	—
October 15, 2011	Guangzhou	China	Guangzhou Gymnasium	—
October 22, 2011	Macau		Cotai Arena	—
December 16, 2011	Vancouver	Canada	Queen Elizabeth Theatre	—
December 19, 2011	Mississauga	Canada	Paramount Fine Foods Centre	—
April 21, 2012	Foshan	China	Foshan Lingnan Mingzhu Gymnasium	—
April 29, 2012	Guangzhou	China	Henry Fok Stadium	—
May 26, 2012	Reno	United States	The Reno Ballroom	—
December 2, 2012	Guangzhou	China	Sun Yat-sen Memorial Hall	—
Total				N/A

== One-off concerts ==
Event name	Date	City	Country	Venue	Ref.
G.E.M. Backstage Live	November 21, 2008	Hong Kong		Backstage Live	
Easter G.E.M. Magical Music Party	April 12, 2009	Hong Kong			
G.E.M. Party Mini Concert	November 14, 2009	Hong Kong			
18 Live 2009 Concert	November 20–22, 2009	Hong Kong		Kowloonbay International Trade & Exhibition Centre	
18 Live 2009 Concert	December 28, 2009	Toronto	Canada	Richmond Hill Performing Arts Centre	
G.E.M. Live In Macau	August 13, 2010	Macau		Macau Fisherman's Wharf Convention and Exhibition Centre	
G.E.M. Xposed Taipei Ximen Riverbank Concert	July 27, 2012	Taipei	Taiwan	Taipei Ximen Riverbank	
Metro G.E.M. Girls' Power Concert	June 19, 2015	Hong Kong			

== Other ==
Event name	Date	City	Country	Venue	Ref.
2025 League of Legends World Championship Opening Ceremony	November 9, 2025	Chengdu	China	Dong'an Lake Sports Park Multifunctional Gymnasium	
