= I Am Gloria World Tour =

2023–2025 concert tour by G.E.M.

- Tour by G.E.M.
- Promotional poster example
- Location: Asia; Europe; North America
- Associated album: City Zoo; Revelation
- Start date: December 7, 2023
- End date: October 5, 2026
- No. of shows: 182
- Attendance: 3.925 million (incomplete, as of July 2026)
- Box office: $424 million (as of March 2025)

G.E.M. concert chronology
- Queen of Hearts World Tour （2017–2019）; I Am Gloria World Tour （2023–2026）

The I Am Gloria World Tour is the fourth concert tour by Hong Kong singer-songwriter G.E.M. (Chinese: 鄧紫棋), held in support of her sixth and seventh studio albums, City Zoo (2019) and Revelation (2022). The tour began on December 7, 2023, at the Guangdong Olympic Stadium in Guangzhou. The tour features an all-stadium lineup in mainland China, Hong Kong, and Southeast Asia, and has expanded into arenas in Europe and North America.

The I Am Gloria World Tour broke various records for both a Chinese and Asian artist in terms of its ticket sales, commercial gross, and attendance. It drew over 3 million attendees in 2024 alone and generated a total of US$424million in revenue as of March 2025, making it the fourth highest-grossing concert tour by a female artist of all-time.

== Background ==
During the development of the I Am Gloria World Tour, G.E.M. embraced her given name Gloria to explore themes of personal growth and transformation. The tour began in December 2023 in Guangzhou, China, and has since expanded into dozens of cities in mainland China. On November 2, 2024, concert dates in Paris, London, Kuala Lumpur, and Singapore were announced. On March 21, 2025, shows were announced in nine cities in Mainland China.

== Production ==
=== Stage ===
G.E.M. served as the tour’s creative director. The stage setup for the I Am Gloria Tour features a 20-meter-high and 63-meter-wide IMAX screen. The sound system features a control console from the L-Acoustics K series of France, utilizing nearly 200 speakers. G.E.M. personally tested and monitored the speakers before and after installation to ensure satisfactory auditory experience for the audience.

=== Costume design ===
Tour outfits were created by various designers: Robert Wun, who has designed for Beyoncé, Adele and Lady Gaga; Michael Ngo, who designed costumes for Ariana Grande's concerts; Hong Kong designer Christian Stone; and Sun Ying, who curated and styled over 100 costumes for music video shoots and promotions for G.E.M's Revelation album.

== Critical reception ==
The tour received critical acclaim from music critics. Ang Benson from The Straits Times lauded the singer's "powerful voice" and remarked, "Fleshing out tensions between external forces and one’s inner desires, many songs expressed strong emotions of anger, disappointment and sorrow, which the singer seemed to be grappling with in recent years." In an article published on Tencent News, an editor wrote, "Her voice possesses remarkable versatility, effortlessly transitioning between true and falsetto tones. From her heartfelt renditions of classics like 'Bubble' and 'Light Years Away' to her exploration of experimental sounds in the new album 'Revelation', she demonstrates perfect control".

== Commercial performance ==
The I Am Gloria World Tour became the first tour to hold three consecutive concerts at the Guangdong Olympic Stadium in Guangzhou. In May 2024, it was reported that the tour had already grossed ¥500 million (over $70 million) in six months. In January 2025, it was reported that the tour had attracted over 3 million people and generated HK$2.657 billion ($341 million) in revenue in 2024 alone. By March 2025, the tour grossed a cumulative total of $424 million in revenue, making it the fourth highest-grossing tour by a female recording artist of all-time.

== Accolades ==
Awards and nominations for the I Am Gloria World Tour
Year	Organization	Category	Result	Ref.
2023	Guangdong Performing Arts Association	Top Performances of the Year	Won	
2024	Guangdong Performing Arts Association	Top Performances of the Year	Won	

== Set list ==
=== I Am Gloria 1.0 (December 2023 – April 2025) ===
This set list is from the concert on December 7, 2023, in Guangzhou, China. It is not intended to represent all shows throughout the tour.

Act I

1. "City Zoo"
2. "Grey Wolf"
3. "Away"
4. "Light Years Away"

Act II

5. "Miss Similar"
6. "Loneliness"
7. "Fly Away"
8. "Selfless"
9. "Hell"
10. "Goodbye"

Act III

11. "Man Who Laughs"
12. Medley: "Sleeping Beauty" / "A.I.N.Y." / "Where Did U Go" / "Survive" / "Intoxicated" / "You're Not Truly Happy" / "Tornado" / "Red & White" / "Long After"
13. "Full Stop"

Act IV

14. "Gloria"
15. "Amazing Grace"
16. "One Minute"
17. Surprise songs (Acoustic piano version)
18. "Long Distance" (Acoustic piano version)
19. "Find You"
20. "Like You"

Act V

21. "The End of the Night"
22. "Tik Tok"
23. "Heartbeat"
24. "G.E.M. (Get Everybody Moving)" / "Walk on Water"

Encore

25. "Bubble"
26. T.I.M.E. EP random song
27. "The Sky"

==== Alterations ====
- "Fly Away" was performed after "Loneliness" starting from the Nanning shows.
- "You Raise Me Up" replaced "Amazing Grace" starting from the Shenzhen shows.
- "City Zoo" was not performed in Beijing due to the performance not passing the review. Instead, "Beijing" was added to the setlist after "Away" as a substitute.
- During the May 28 and June 1, 2024 shows in Shanghai, and August 25, 2024 show in Beijing, "Superpower" was performed before "Bubble".
- "Angels" was performed after "Bubble" during shows in Wuhan.

=== I Am Gloria 2.0 (May 2025 – October 2026) ===
This set list is from the concert on May 10, 2025, in Wenzhou, China. It is not intended to represent all shows throughout the tour.

Act I

1. "City Zoo"
2. "Grey Wolf"
3. "Away"
4. "Light Years Away"

Act II

5. "Miss Similar"
6. "Selfless"
7. "Loneliness"
8. "Ice Age"
9. "Therefore"
10. "Goodbye"

Act III

11. "Man Who Laughs"
12. Medley: "Sleeping Beauty" / "A.I.N.Y." / "Where Did U Go" / "Intoxicated" / "You're Not Truly Happy" / "Tornado" / "Red & White"
13. "Only One"
14. "Full Stop"

Act IV

15. "Gloria"
16. "You Raise Me Up"
17. "One Minute"
18. "Old Man & Sea (Piano)"
19. "Long Distance" (Acoustic piano version)
20. "Find You"
21. "Like You"

Act V

22. "The End of the Night"
23. "Tik Tok"
24. "Heartbeat"
25. "G.E.M. (Get Everybody Moving)" / "Walk on Water"

Encore

26. "Bubble"
27. T.I.M.E. EP random song
28. "The Sky"

== Tour dates ==
List of tour dates
Date	City	Country	Venue	Attendance
December 7, 2023	Guangzhou	China	Guangdong Olympic Stadium	90,000
December 8, 2023	Guangzhou	China	Guangdong Olympic Stadium	90,000
December 9, 2023	Guangzhou	China	Guangdong Olympic Stadium	90,000
December 23, 2023	Nanning	China	Guangxi Sports Centre Stadium	80,000
December 24, 2023	Nanning	China	Guangxi Sports Centre Stadium	80,000
January 6, 2024	Shenzhen	China	Shenzhen Bay Sports Center	—
January 7, 2024	Shenzhen	China	Shenzhen Bay Sports Center	—
January 8, 2024	Shenzhen	China	Shenzhen Bay Sports Center	—
January 20, 2024	Quanzhou	China	Quanzhou Strait Sports Center Stadium	100,000
January 21, 2024	Quanzhou	China	Quanzhou Strait Sports Center Stadium	100,000
March 30, 2024	Hefei	China	Hefei Olympic Sports Center Stadium	100,000
March 31, 2024	Hefei	China	Hefei Olympic Sports Center Stadium	100,000
April 12, 2024	Changsha	China	Helong Sports Center Stadium	100,000
April 13, 2024	Changsha	China	Helong Sports Center Stadium	100,000
April 14, 2024	Changsha	China	Helong Sports Center Stadium	100,000
April 18, 2024	Foshan	China	Century Lotus Stadium	120,000
April 19, 2024	Foshan	China	Century Lotus Stadium	120,000
April 20, 2024	Foshan	China	Century Lotus Stadium	120,000
April 21, 2024	Foshan	China	Century Lotus Stadium	120,000
May 2, 2024	Tianjin	China	Tianjin Olympic Centre Stadium	96,000
May 3, 2024	Tianjin	China	Tianjin Olympic Centre Stadium	96,000
May 11, 2024	Dalian	China	Dalian Sports Centre Stadium	80,000
May 12, 2024	Dalian	China	Dalian Sports Centre Stadium	80,000
May 18, 2024	Taiyuan	China	Shanxi Sports Centre Stadium	—
May 19, 2024	Taiyuan	China	Shanxi Sports Centre Stadium	—
May 24, 2024	Shanghai	China	Shanghai Stadium	235,000
May 25, 2024	Shanghai	China	Shanghai Stadium	235,000
May 26, 2024	Shanghai	China	Shanghai Stadium	235,000
May 27, 2024	Shanghai	China	Shanghai Stadium	235,000
May 28, 2024	Shanghai	China	Shanghai Stadium	235,000
June 1, 2024	Chengdu	China	Dong'an Lake Sports Park Main Stadium	—
June 2, 2024	Chengdu	China	Dong'an Lake Sports Park Main Stadium	—
June 3, 2024	Chengdu	China	Dong'an Lake Sports Park Main Stadium	—
June 15, 2024	Qingdao	China	Qingdao Citizen Fitness Center Stadium	—
June 16, 2024	Qingdao	China	Qingdao Citizen Fitness Center Stadium	—
June 22, 2024	Nanjing	China	Nanjing Olympic Sports Center Stadium	—
June 23, 2024	Nanjing	China	Nanjing Olympic Sports Center Stadium	—
June 29, 2024	Zhengzhou	China	Zhengzhou Olympics Sports Center Stadium	—
June 30, 2024	Zhengzhou	China	Zhengzhou Olympics Sports Center Stadium	—
July 6, 2024	Fuzhou	China	Haixia Olympic Center	—
July 7, 2024	Fuzhou	China	Haixia Olympic Center	—
July 13, 2024	Harbin	China	HICEC Stadium	—
July 20, 2024	Taizhou	China	Taizhou Sports Center Stadium	—
July 21, 2024	Taizhou	China	Taizhou Sports Center Stadium	—
July 27, 2024	Hohhot	China	Hohhot City Stadium	—
August 2, 2024	Macau		Galaxy Arena	60,000
August 3, 2024	Macau		Galaxy Arena	60,000
August 4, 2024	Macau		Galaxy Arena	60,000
August 9, 2024	Macau		Galaxy Arena	60,000
August 10, 2024	Macau		Galaxy Arena	60,000
August 11, 2024	Macau		Galaxy Arena	60,000
August 22, 2024	Beijing	China	Beijing National Stadium	—
August 23, 2024	Beijing	China	Beijing National Stadium	—
August 24, 2024	Beijing	China	Beijing National Stadium	—
August 25, 2024	Beijing	China	Beijing National Stadium	—
September 7, 2024	Quzhou	China	Quzhou Sports Center Stadium	—
September 8, 2024	Quzhou	China	Quzhou Sports Center Stadium	—
September 21, 2024	Qingyuan	China	Qingyuan Sports Center Stadium	—
September 22, 2024	Qingyuan	China	Qingyuan Sports Center Stadium	—
September 27, 2024	Xi'an	China	Xi'an Olympic Sports Center Stadium	—
September 28, 2024	Xi'an	China	Xi'an Olympic Sports Center Stadium	—
October 6, 2024	Wuhan	China	Wuhan Sports Center Stadium	—
October 7, 2024	Wuhan	China	Wuhan Sports Center Stadium	—
October 12, 2024	Jinan	China	Jinan Olympic Sports Center Stadium	—
October 13, 2024	Jinan	China	Jinan Olympic Sports Center Stadium	—
October 19, 2024	Chongqing	China	Chongqing Olympic Sports Center Stadium	—
October 20, 2024	Chongqing	China	Chongqing Olympic Sports Center Stadium	—
October 26, 2024	Suzhou	China	Suzhou Sports Center Stadium	—
October 27, 2024	Suzhou	China	Suzhou Sports Center Stadium	—
November 9, 2024	Nanchang	China	Nanchang International Sports Center Stadium	—
November 10, 2024	Nanchang	China	Nanchang International Sports Center Stadium	—
November 15, 2024	Hangzhou	China	Hangzhou Olympic Sports Center Stadium	138,000
November 16, 2024	Hangzhou	China	Hangzhou Olympic Sports Center Stadium	138,000
November 17, 2024	Hangzhou	China	Hangzhou Olympic Sports Center Stadium	138,000
November 30, 2024	Zhangjiang	China	Zhanjiang Sports Centre	—
December 1, 2024	Zhangjiang	China	Zhanjiang Sports Centre	—
December 21, 2024	Xiamen	China	Xiamen Egret Stadium	—
December 22, 2024	Xiamen	China	Xiamen Egret Stadium	—
December 28, 2024	Huizhou	China	Huizhou Olympic Stadium	—
December 29, 2024	Huizhou	China	Huizhou Olympic Stadium	—
December 31, 2024	Huizhou	China	Huizhou Olympic Stadium	—
January 11, 2025	Zhaoqing	China	Zhaoqing Sports Centre Stadium	—
January 12, 2025	Zhaoqing	China	Zhaoqing Sports Centre Stadium	—
January 21, 2025	Paris	France	Zénith Paris	—
January 24, 2025	London	England	OVO Arena Wembley	—
February 15, 2025	Kuala Lumpur	Malaysia	Bukit Jalil National Stadium	65,000
March 1, 2025	Singapore		Singapore National Stadium	42,000
March 15, 2025	Las Vegas	United States	MGM Grand Garden Arena	—
March 22, 2025	San Francisco	United States	Chase Center	—
March 29, 2025	New York City	United States	Barclays Center	—
April 7, 2025	Toronto	Canada	Coca-Cola Coliseum	—
May 10, 2025	Wenzhou	China	Wenzhou Olympic Sports Center Stadium	72,000
May 11, 2025	Wenzhou	China	Wenzhou Olympic Sports Center Stadium	72,000
May 17, 2025	Xiangyang	China	Xiangyang Sports Center Stadium	60,000
May 18, 2025	Xiangyang	China	Xiangyang Sports Center Stadium	60,000
May 24, 2025	Hengyang	China	Hengyang Sports Center Stadium	100,000
May 25, 2025	Hengyang	China	Hengyang Sports Center Stadium	100,000
May 26, 2025	Hengyang	China	Hengyang Sports Center Stadium	100,000
May 31, 2025	Guiyang	China	Guiyang Olympic Sports Center Stadium	80,000
June 1, 2025	Guiyang	China	Guiyang Olympic Sports Center Stadium	80,000
June 14, 2025	Shijiazhuang	China	Hebei Olympic Sports Center Stadium	—
June 15, 2025	Shijiazhuang	China	Hebei Olympic Sports Center Stadium	—
July 5, 2025	Yantai	China	Yantai Sports Park Stadium	100,000
July 6, 2025	Yantai	China	Yantai Sports Park Stadium	100,000
July 12, 2025	Shenyang	China	Shenyang Olympic Sports Centre Stadium	—
July 13, 2025	Shenyang	China	Shenyang Olympic Sports Centre Stadium	—
July 26, 2025	Luoyang	China	Luoyang Olympic Center Stadium	—
July 27, 2025	Luoyang	China	Luoyang Olympic Center Stadium	—
August 2, 2025	Ganzhou	China	Ganzhou National Fitness Center	—
August 3, 2025	Ganzhou	China	Ganzhou National Fitness Center	—
August 15, 2025	Hong Kong		Kai Tak Stadium	200,000
August 16, 2025	Hong Kong		Kai Tak Stadium	200,000
August 17, 2025	Hong Kong		Kai Tak Stadium	200,000
August 19, 2025	Hong Kong		Kai Tak Stadium	200,000
August 20, 2025	Hong Kong		Kai Tak Stadium	200,000
August 29, 2025	Shanghai	China	Hongkou Football Stadium	—
August 30, 2025	Shanghai	China	Hongkou Football Stadium	—
August 31, 2025	Shanghai	China	Hongkou Football Stadium	—
September 5, 2025	Shanghai	China	Hongkou Football Stadium	—
September 6, 2025	Shanghai	China	Hongkou Football Stadium	—
September 7, 2025	Shanghai	China	Hongkou Football Stadium	—
September 12, 2025	Shanghai	China	Hongkou Football Stadium	—
September 13, 2025	Shanghai	China	Hongkou Football Stadium	—
September 14, 2025	Shanghai	China	Hongkou Football Stadium	—
September 19, 2025	Shanghai	China	Hongkou Football Stadium	—
September 20, 2025	Shanghai	China	Hongkou Football Stadium	—
September 21, 2025	Shanghai	China	Hongkou Football Stadium	—
October 17, 2025	Chengdu	China	Dong'an Lake Sports Park Stadium	—
October 18, 2025	Chengdu	China	Dong'an Lake Sports Park Stadium	—
October 19, 2025	Chengdu	China	Dong'an Lake Sports Park Stadium	—
October 25, 2025	Xuzhou	China	Xuzhou Olympic Sports Center Stadium	—
October 26, 2025	Xuzhou	China	Xuzhou Olympic Sports Center Stadium	—
November 1, 2025	Wuhan	China	Wuhan Sports Center Stadium	—
November 2, 2025	Wuhan	China	Wuhan Sports Center Stadium	—
November 15, 2025	Fuzhou	China	Haixia Olympic Center	—
November 16, 2025	Fuzhou	China	Haixia Olympic Center	—
November 29, 2025	Nanning	China	Guangxi Sports Center Stadium	—
November 30, 2025	Nanning	China	Guangxi Sports Center Stadium	—
December 6, 2025	Sanya	China	Sanya Sports Center Stadium	—
December 7, 2025	Sanya	China	Sanya Sports Center Stadium	—
December 26, 2025	Guangzhou	China	Guangdong Olympic Stadium	—
December 27, 2025	Guangzhou	China	Guangdong Olympic Stadium	—
December 28, 2025	Guangzhou	China	Guangdong Olympic Stadium	—
December 31, 2025	Guangzhou	China	Guangdong Olympic Stadium	—
January 3, 2026	Guangzhou	China	Guangdong Olympic Stadium	—
January 4, 2026	Guangzhou	China	Guangdong Olympic Stadium	—
January 9, 2026	Guangzhou	China	Guangdong Olympic Stadium	—
January 10, 2026	Guangzhou	China	Guangdong Olympic Stadium	—
January 11, 2026	Guangzhou	China	Guangdong Olympic Stadium	—
January 13, 2026	Guangzhou	China	Guangdong Olympic Stadium	—
April 09, 2026	Taipei	Taiwan	Taipei Dome	150,000
April 10, 2026	Taipei	Taiwan	Taipei Dome	150,000
April 11, 2026	Taipei	Taiwan	Taipei Dome	150,000
April 12, 2026	Taipei	Taiwan	Taipei Dome	150,000
May 2, 2026	Xiamen	China	Xiamen Egret Stadium	—
May 3, 2026	Xiamen	China	Xiamen Egret Stadium	—
May 23, 2026	Singapore	Singapore	Singapore National Stadium	—
June 06, 2026	Kuala Lumpur	Malaysia	TM National Stadium Bukit Jalil	56,000
~~July 10, 2026~~	~~Hangzhou~~	China	~~Hangzhou Olympic Sports Center Stadium~~	— (cancelled due to Typhoon Bavi)
~~July 11, 2026~~	~~Hangzhou~~	China	~~Hangzhou Olympic Sports Center Stadium~~	— (cancelled due to Typhoon Bavi)
~~July 12, 2026~~	~~Hangzhou~~	China	~~Hangzhou Olympic Sports Center Stadium~~	— (cancelled due to Typhoon Bavi)
July 24, 2026	Tianjin	China	Tianjin Olympic Centre Stadium	—
July 25, 2026	Tianjin	China	Tianjin Olympic Centre Stadium	—
July 26, 2026	Tianjin	China	Tianjin Olympic Centre Stadium	—
August 7, 2026	Nanchang	China	Nanchang International Sports Center Stadium	—
August 8, 2026	Nanchang	China	Nanchang International Sports Center Stadium	—
August 9, 2026	Nanchang	China	Nanchang International Sports Center Stadium	—
August 14, 2026	Jiaxing	China	Jiaxing Sports Center Stadium	—
August 15, 2026	Jiaxing	China	Jiaxing Sports Center Stadium	—
August 16, 2026	Jiaxing	China	Jiaxing Sports Center Stadium	—
August 21, 2026	Chongqing	China	Chongqing Olympic Sports Center Stadium	—
August 22, 2026	Chongqing	China	Chongqing Olympic Sports Center Stadium	—
August 23, 2026	Chongqing	China	Chongqing Olympic Sports Center Stadium	—
September 11, 2026	Shenzhen (Finale)	China	Shenzhen Universiade Center Stadium	—
September 12, 2026	Shenzhen (Finale)	China	Shenzhen Universiade Center Stadium	—
September 13, 2026	Shenzhen (Finale)	China	Shenzhen Universiade Center Stadium	—
September 19, 2026	Shenzhen (Finale)	China	Shenzhen Universiade Center Stadium	—
September 20, 2026	Shenzhen (Finale)	China	Shenzhen Universiade Center Stadium	—
September 25, 2026	Shenzhen (Finale)	China	Shenzhen Universiade Center Stadium	—
September 26, 2026	Shenzhen (Finale)	China	Shenzhen Universiade Center Stadium	—
September 27, 2026	Shenzhen (Finale)	China	Shenzhen Universiade Center Stadium	—
October 1, 2026	Shenzhen (Finale)	China	Shenzhen Universiade Center Stadium	—
October 2, 2026	Shenzhen (Finale)	China	Shenzhen Universiade Center Stadium	—
October 4, 2026	Shenzhen (Finale)	China	Shenzhen Universiade Center Stadium	—
October 5, 2026	Shenzhen (Finale)	China	Shenzhen Universiade Center Stadium	—
Total				N/A
