= One Way Road =

One Way Road may refer to:

- "One Way Road", a song by G.E.M. from Heartbeat, 2015
- "One Way Road", a song by the John Butler Trio from April Uprising, 2010
- "One Way Road", song by Oasis from Who Feels Love?, 2000

== See also ==
- One-way road
