= Queen of Hearts World Tour =

2017–2019 concert tour by G.E.M.

- World tour by G.E.M.
- Location: Asia; North America; Australia
- Associated album: Heartbeat; Happily Ever After
- Start date: April 1, 2017
- End date: April 28, 2019
- No. of shows: 48

G.E.M. concert chronology
- X.X.X. Live Tour （2012–15）; Queen of Hearts World Tour （2017–19）; I Am Gloria World Tour （2023–26）

The Queen of Hearts World Tour was the third concert tour by Chinese and Hong Kong singer-songwriter G.E.M., held in support of her fourth studio album, Heartbeat (2015). The tour began on April 1, 2017, at the Guangzhou International Sports Arena and ended on April 28, 2019, at the Kaohsiung Arena.

== Background ==
The first phase of the Queen of Hearts World Tour began on April 1, 2017, at the Guangzhou International Sports and Performing Arts Center in Guangzhou, and concluded on August 18, 2018, in Xi'an, China. The second phase of the tour began on March 9, 2019, at the Cotai Arena in Macau.

== Production ==
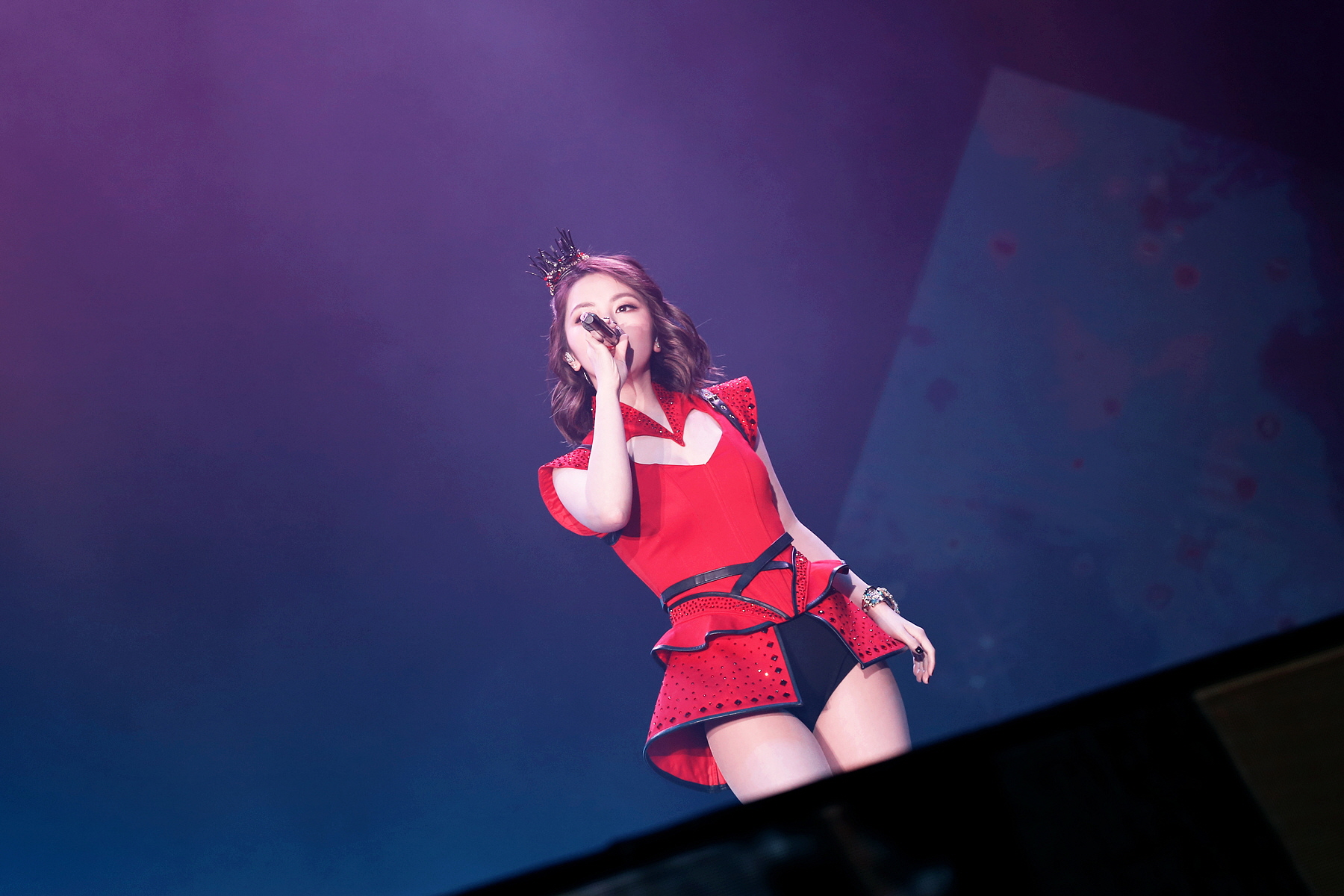
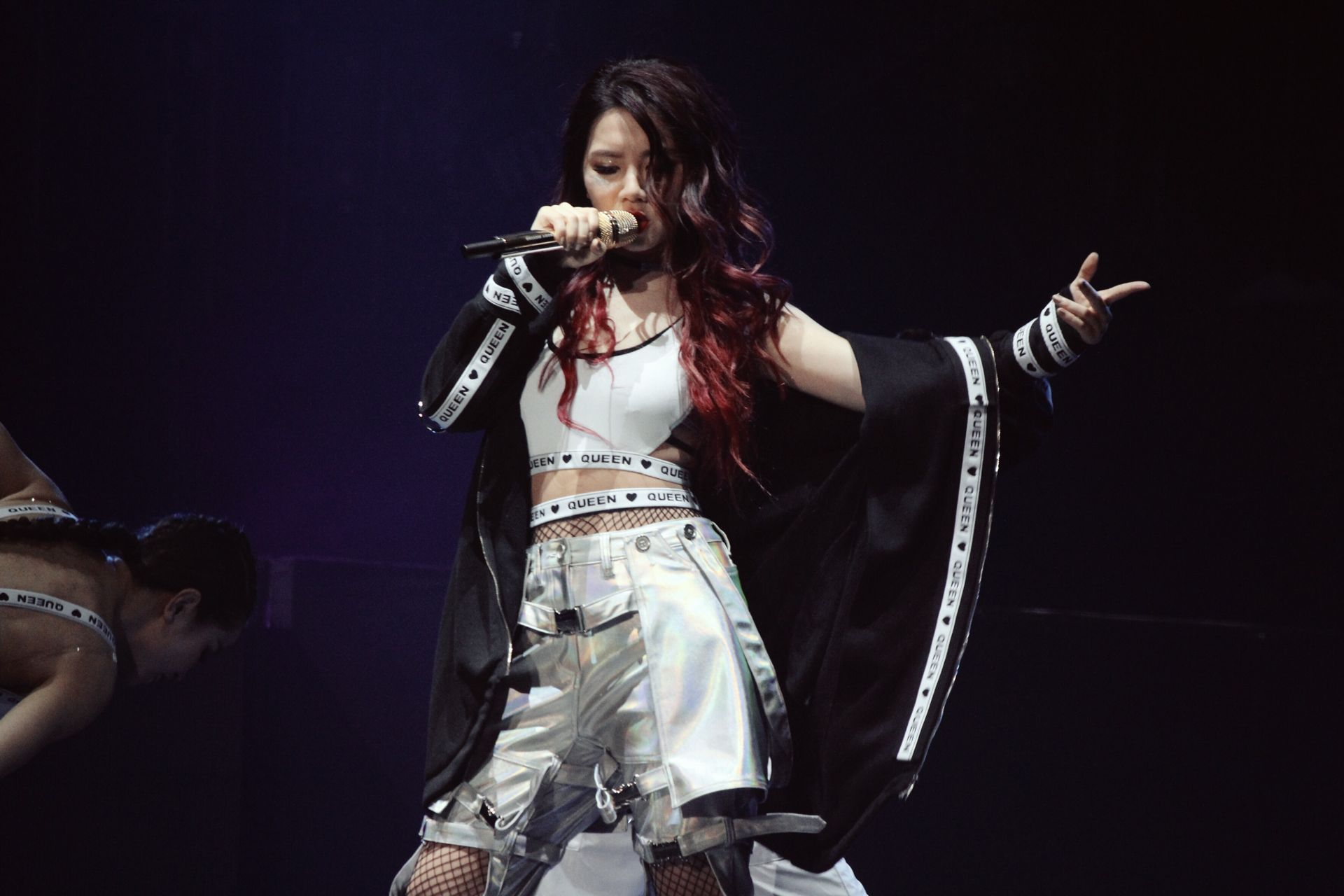
G.E.M. performing during the Queen of Hearts Tour

=== Costume design ===
Emma Wallace designed the outfit for the opening act, using two different shades of red crystals to complement the Queen of Hearts Tour theme. The wardrobe also features a lineup of Swarovski-embellished outfits.

== Critical reception ==
The tour received positive reviews from music critics. Boon Chan from The Straits Times commended G.E.M.'s vocal performance, writing how the singer "with the giant lungs filled the arena with her powerful singing as she belted out the high notes and held them with ease."

== Set list ==
This set list is from the concerts on August 12–13, 2017, in Singapore. It is not intended to represent all shows throughout the tour.

Main set

1. "A.I.N.Y."
2. "What Have U Done"
3. "All Natural"
4. "Behind the Mask"
5. "Love and Death"
6. "My Secret"
7. "Goodbye"
8. "Survive"
9. "Tornado"
10. "One Button"
11. "Bubble"
12. "Light Years Away"
13. "Intoxicated"
14. "Away"
15. "Therefore"
16. "Red and White"
17. "Long Distance"
18. "One Way Road"
19. "The End of the World"
20. "Chuck Close" (Lupo Solo)
21. "Heartbeat"
22. "See You Again"
23. "Get Everybody Moving"
24. "Loving You"
25. “Stranger in the North”

== Tour dates ==
List of tour dates
Date	City	Country	Venue	Attendance
April 1, 2017	Guangzhou	China	Guangzhou International Sports Arena	—
April 2, 2017	Guangzhou	China	Guangzhou International Sports Arena	—
April 8, 2017	Nanjing	China	Nanjing Olympic Sports Centre	—
April 15, 2017	Beijing	China	National Indoor Stadium	10,000
April 29, 2017	Luoyang	China	Luoyang New District Gymnasium	—
May 13, 2017	Nanchang	China	Nanchang International Sports Center	—
May 20, 2017	Changsha	China	Hunan Int'l Convention and Exhibition Center	—
May 28, 2017	Wuhan	China	Wuhan Sports Center Gymnasium	—
August 5, 2017	Suzhou	China	Suzhou Sports Center Gymnasium	—
August 12, 2017	Singapore		Singapore Indoor Stadium	16,000
August 13, 2017	Singapore		Singapore Indoor Stadium	16,000
August 26, 2017	Hefei	China	Binhu Int'l Convention and Exhibition Center	—
September 2, 2017	Chongqing	China	Chongqing International Expo Center	—
September 15, 2017	Hong Kong		Hong Kong Coliseum	30,000
September 16, 2017	Hong Kong		Hong Kong Coliseum	30,000
September 17, 2017	Hong Kong		Hong Kong Coliseum	30,000
September 30, 2017	Melbourne	Australia	Melbourne Sports Complex	—
October 2, 2017	Sydney	Australia	International Convention Centre Sydney	—
October 5, 2017	Perth	Australia	Crown Perth	—
November 18, 2017	Kuala Lumpur	Malaysia	Axiata Arena	—
November 25, 2017	Zhengzhou	China	Zhengzhou Int'l Convention & Exhibition Center	—
December 2, 2017	Shenzhen	China	Shenzhen Bay Sports Center Gymnasium	—
December 9, 2017	Nanning	China	Guangxi Sports Center	—
December 23, 2017	Dalian	China	Zhongsheng Cultural Center	—
January 13, 2018	Hangzhou	China	Huanglong Sports Center	—
February 24, 2018	Macau		Cotai Arena	—
March 23, 2018	Taoyuan	Taiwan	NTSU Arena	25,000
March 24, 2018	Taoyuan	Taiwan	NTSU Arena	25,000
March 25, 2018	Taoyuan	Taiwan	NTSU Arena	25,000
April 1, 2018	Uncasville	United States	Mohegan Sun Arena	—
May 26, 2018	Dongguan	China	Bank of Dongguan Basketball Center	—
June 2, 2018	Chengdu	China	Wuliangye Chengdu Performing Arts Center	—
June 30, 2018	George Town	Malaysia	SPICE Arena	—
July 1, 2018	George Town	Malaysia	SPICE Arena	—
July 7, 2018	Foshan	China	Lingnan Pearl Sports Center	—
July 28, 2018	Jinan	China	Jinan Olympic Sports Center Gymnasium	—
August 4, 2018	Shanghai	China	Mercedes-Benz Arena	—
August 5, 2018	Shanghai	China	Mercedes-Benz Arena	—
August 11, 2018	Tianjin	China	Tianjin Gymnasium	—
August 18, 2018	Xi'an	China	Qujiang Int'l Convention & Exhibition Center	—
March 9, 2019	Macau		Cotai Arena	—
March 15, 2019	Vancouver	Canada	Queen Elizabeth Theatre	—
March 20, 2019	Toronto	Canada	Coca-Cola Coliseum	—
March 22, 2019	San Francisco	United States	Bill Graham Civic Auditorium	—
April 5, 2019	Genting Highlands	Malaysia	Arena of Stars	—
April 6, 2019	Genting Highlands	Malaysia	Arena of Stars	—
April 27, 2019	Kaohsiung	Taiwan	Kaohsiung Arena	—
April 28, 2019	Kaohsiung	Taiwan	Kaohsiung Arena	—
Total				N/A
