= Away (G.E.M. song) =

Single by G.E.M.

from the album Heartbeat
- Language: Mandarin; English
- Released: November 4, 2015
- Recorded: 2015
- Genre: Synth-pop
- Length: 3:37
- Label: Hummingbird Music
- Songwriter: G.E.M.
- Producer: Lupo Groinig

G.E.M. singles chronology
"Goodbye" (2015)	"Away" (2015)	"A Man of Intention" (2016)

Music video
- "Away" on YouTube

"Away" (Chinese: 來自天堂的魔鬼; pinyin: Láizì tiāntáng de móguǐ; lit. Devil from heaven) is a song recorded by Hong Kong singer-songwriter G.E.M. It was released via Hummingbird Music as the sixth single for her fourth studio album, Heartbeat (2015), and was made available for digital consumption on November 4, 2015. The recording was written and composed by G.E.M. whilst production was handled by Lupo Groining. Musically, the pop track features guitars, synthesizers, keyboards and drums as instrumentations. Lyrically, the songwriting contains themes of romance and temptation.

Upon its release, "Away" received positive reviews from music critics, who complimented the song's production and the singer's vocal delivery. An accompanying music video was directed by Jeff Nicholas, showcasing G.E.M. performing the song in black smoky makeup. It has since reached over 130 million views on YouTube. In order to promote "Away", G.E.M. performed the song at several events in Greater China and was included on the singer's Queen of Hearts World Tour and I Am Gloria World Tour.

== Background and release ==
"Away" was released as the sixth and final single from G.E.M.'s album Heartbeat on November 4, 2015.

== Composition and lyrics ==
"Away" is a dance and synth-pop song that combines elements of electronic music and rock. The lyrics portray the emotional struggle of ambiguity. When G.E.M. sings, "If you are the temptation of the snake, you deliberately confuse me, so that I can be weak; but you are the nonchalant apple on Newton's head," the other person is depicted as both pure and wicked, akin to a "devil from heaven." G.E.M. perceives the person's unintentional yet attractive smile difficult to break free from.

== Music video ==
The music video for "Away" was filmed in the United States. Jeff Nicholas, who had previously worked with artists such as Justin Timberlake and Rihanna, directed the video, which features G.E.M. in black smoky makeup and a custom white dress.

== Live performances ==
G.E.M. performed "Away" and the 2019 Jiangsu Satellite TV New Year's Eve Concert at the Cotai Arena in Macau. She again performed it at the 2024 edition of the same event.

== Track listing ==
- Digital download / streaming
1. "Away" – 4:05

== Credits and personnel ==
- G.E.M. – vocals, background vocals
- Lupo Groining – producer, keys/synths & programming, executive producer
- Richard Furch – mixing
- Reuben Cohen – mastering
- Jeff Nicholas – music video director

== Release history ==
Release dates and formats
Region	Date	Format	Label
Various	November 4, 2015	Digital download; streaming	Hummingbird Music
