= The Best of 2008–2012 =

Compilation album by G.E.M.
- Released: March 27, 2013
- Genre: Pop
- Label: Hummingbird

G.E.M. chronology
Xposed (2012)	The Best of 2008–2012 (2013)	Heartbeat (2015)

The Best of 2008–2012 is the first compilation album by Chinese singer G.E.M., released on March 27, 2013, by Hummingbird Music.

== Track listing ==
CD1
No.	Title	Lyrics	Music	Length
1.	"A.I.N.Y."	G.E.M.	Lupo Groinig, G.E.M.	03:44
2.	"Someday I'll Fly"	G.E.M.	Franzel Jeffrey B, Hollander Andrew B, Dana Parish	03:51
3.	"All About U"	G.E.M.	Kaci Brown, Marc Nelkin, David Gamson	04:01
4.	"Bubble"	G.E.M.	G.E.M.	04:18
5.	"In My Heart"	G.E.M.	Lupo Groinig, G.E.M.	04:58
6.	"Sleeping Beauty"	G.E.M.	G.E.M.	04:42
7.	"Lover (Live Version)"	Wong Ka Kui	Wong Ka Kui	06:06
8.	"Hourglass of Memories"	Ting Zhu	G.E.M.	03:53
9.	"The Rose"	G.E.M.	G.E.M.	04:46
10.	"Mascara"	G.E.M., AnieFann	G.E.M.	04:05
11.	"G.E.M. (Get Everybody Moving)"	Lupo Groining, G.E.M.	Lupo Groining, G.E.M.	03:27
12.	"Where Did You Go 2.0 (Sam Vahdat Remix)"	G.E.M.	Skot Suyama	03:56

CD2
No.	Title	Lyrics	Music	Length
1.	"Where Did U Go"	G.E.M.	Skot Suyama	03:54
2.	"Get Over You"	G.E.M.	Blair Daly, Bridget Benenate, Chris Farren	03:57
3.	"Good to Be Bad"	G.E.M.	Peter Roberts	03:49
4.	"What Have U Done"	G.E.M.	Johnny Pederson, Michael Jay, Rike Boomgaarden	03:36
5.	"Want to Tell You"	G.E.M.	Marc Nelkin, Jennifer Karr, Sidh Solanki	02:52
6.	"My Secret"	G.E.M.	G.E.M.	04:10
7.	"Miracle"	G.E.M.	G.E.M., Lupo Groinig	03:51
8.	"Seine River"	Chen Hongyu	G.E.M.	03:30
9.	"Oh Boy"	G.E.M.	G.E.M., Lupo Groinig	03:04
10.	"Twinkle II"	G.E.M.	Jane Taylor, G.E.M.	04:17
11.	"18"	G.E.M.	G.E.M.	03:35
12.	"A.I.N.Y. (Live Version)"	G.E.M.	Lupo Groinig, G.E.M.	03:59
