= Long After =

Promotional single by G.E.M.

from the album City Zoo
- Language: Mandarin
- Released: March 2, 2020
- Recorded: 2019
- Genre: Pop
- Length: 4:50
- Label: G Nation; Sony
- Songwriter(s): G.E.M.
- Producer(s): G.E.M.; Terrence Ma

Music video
- "Long After" on YouTube

"Long After" (Chinese: 很久以後; pinyin: Hěnjiǔ yǐhòu) is a song by Hong Kong singer-songwriter G.E.M. from her sixth studio album City Zoo (2019). It serves as the theme song for the Taiwanese romance film Do You Love Me As I Love You (2020). A power ballad, "Long After" was written by G.E.M. and produced by her and Terrence Ma.

The song received positive reviews from music critics, who commended the song's composition and production. On March 2, 2020, a music video for the song was released, showcasing G.E.M. performing the track interspersed with scenes from the film. "Long After" was included on the set list for G.E.M.'s I Am Gloria World Tour as part of a medley.

== Background and writing ==
"Long After" was written by G.E.M. and produced by her and Terrence Ma. It serves as a promotional release for the Taiwanese film Do You Love Me As I Love You (Chinese: 可不可以，你也剛好喜歡我), which was released in August 2020.

The song was inspired by G.E.M.'s experience in a past relationship. The imagery of a cat is used to depict how it retreats to a corner to heal its wounds in solitude but must appear strong when facing others. G.E.M. revealed that recording the song took her two days, during which she became emotionally overwhelmed. After viewing the initial edit of the film, G.E.M. decided to adopt the song as its theme.

== Music video and live performances ==
"Long After" received a music video and was directed by Taiwanese director Shiue Bin Jian. Released on March 2, 2020, it was shot in Jingtong, New Taipei City, Taiwan. Intercut scenes feature footage of the lead couple from Do You Love Me As I Love You. On December 9, 2022, G.E.M. performed the song during Hunan TV's Time Concert Season 2. Beginning in 2023, "Long After" was included as part of a medley for G.E.M.'s I Am Gloria World Tour.

== Credits and personnel ==
- G.E.M. – vocals, background vocals, lyrics, production
- Terrence Ma – production, arrangement
- Shiue Bin Jian – music video director

== Charts ==
Chart (2019–2020)	Peak position
China (TME Uni Chart)	52
