= Like You (G.E.M. song) =

Single by G.E.M.
- Language: Cantonese
- Released: August 15, 2014
- Recorded: 2014
- Genre: Pop
- Length: 3:59
- Label: Hummingbird Music
- Songwriter(s): Wong Ka Kui
- Producer(s): Wong Ka Kui; Lupo Groinig

G.E.M. singles chronology
| "Intoxicated" (2013) | "Like You" (2014) | "Long Distance" (2015) |

Music video
- "Like You" on YouTube

"Like You" (Chinese: 喜歡你; Jyutping: Hei2fun1 nei5) is a song by Hong Kong singer-songwriter G.E.M., released through Hummingbird Music on August 15, 2014. It is a cover of a 1988 song by Hong Kong band Beyond, which was written and produced by the band's lead vocalist Wong Ka Kui.

== Background and release ==
"Like You" was composed by Hong Kong singer-songwriter Wong Ka Kui, the lead vocalist of the band Beyond. As the sole Hong Kong representative on the music variety show I Am a Singer Season 2, G.E.M. felt a sense of responsibility to showcase Cantonese music. She choose to perform a cover of "Like You" on the show after having cherished the song since her childhood. Due to its immense popularity among the audience, a studio version of her rendition was later released.

== Music video ==
The music video for "Like You" was directed by Nick Wickham.

== Accolades ==
Awards and nominations for "Like You"
| Year | Organization | Award | Result | Ref. |
|---|---|---|---|---|
| 2014 | Metro Radio Mandarin Music Awards | Metro Hot Song Award | Won | |
| 2014 | Metro Radio Mandarin Music Awards | Metro Hot Producer Award | Won | |
| 2015 | Migu Music Awards | Top Ten Golden Songs Awards | Won | |
| 2018 | Chinese Music Awards | Most Popular Song Award | Won | |

== Credits and personnel ==
- G.E.M. – vocals, background vocals
- Wong Ka Kui – lyrics, composition
- Lupo Groinig – producer, keys/synths & programming
- Nick Wickham – music video director

== Release history ==
Release dates and formats
| Region | Date | Format | Version | Label |
|---|---|---|---|---|
| Various | August 15, 2014 | Digital download; streaming | Original | Hummingbird Music |
| Various | July 10, 2016 | Digital download; streaming | EDM Remix | Hummingbird Music |
