= Queen G =

EP by G.E.M.
- Released: December 28, 2018
- Genre: Pop
- Length: 12:00
- Label: Hummingbird
- Producer: Lupo Groinig

G.E.M. chronology
Fearless (2018)	Queen G (2018)	City Zoo (2019)

Queen G (Chinese: 睡皇后) is the fifth EP by Hong Kong singer G.E.M., released on December 28, 2018 by Hummingbird Music. "Queen G" is the third EP of G.E.M.'s 2018 project of G.E.M.’s "Fairytale Trilogy," where each of the three E.P.’s will feature three new songs written by the singer herself.

== Track listing ==
Tracks
No.	Title	Lyrics	Music	Length
1.	"Love Finds a Way"	G.E.M.	G.E.M., Lupo Groinig	04:54
2.	"Why"	G.E.M.	G.E.M., Lupo Groinig	03:41
3.	"Queen G"	G.E.M.	G.E.M.	03:56

== Charts ==
Year	Title	Peak positions
Year	Title	QQ China
2018	"Love Finds a Way"	4
