= The Sky (song) =

Single by G.E.M.

from the album Revelation
- Language: Mandarin
- Released: September 23, 2022
- Recorded: 2022
- Genre: Pop
- Length: 3:37
- Label: G Nation; Warner Music
- Songwriter: G.E.M.
- Producers: G.E.M.; Terrence Ma

G.E.M. singles chronology
"The End of the Night" (2022)	"The Sky" (2022)	"The One and Only" (2023)

Music video
- "The Sky" on YouTube

"The Sky" (Chinese: 天空没有极限; pinyin: Tiānkōng méiyǒu jíxiàn; lit. The sky is not the limit) is a song by Hong Kong singer-songwriter G.E.M., for her seventh studio album, Revelation (2022). It was released along with the album on September 23, 2022, by G Nation and Sony as the album's final single. It was written by G.E.M. and produced by her and Hong Kong songwriter Terrence Ma.

The lyrics of "The Sky" revolve around themes of determination, strength, and persistence. Its music video serves as the fourteenth and last chapter of the singer's Revelation music video series.

== Background and release ==
"The Sky" was released as the last track from G.E.M.'s album Revelation on September 23, 2022.

== Composition and lyrics ==
G.E.M. felt a notion of having limitless possibilities as she entered her thirties and anticipated period of growth and self-fulfillment. "The Sky" reflects her personal aspirations while also emphasizing her belief in fostering "love." The song includes background vocals from the M9 Marginal Youth Singing Choir in its conclusion, serving as a metaphor to showcase that the new generation also holds a "boundless and infinite potential".

== Music video ==
The music video for "The Sky" was directed by Lin Bo. It was released as the final chapter of G.E.M.'s Revelation music video series.

=== Live video ===
In December 2022, a live video of G.E.M. and Taiwanese band Mayday performing "The Sky" was uploaded to YouTube. It was recorded on December 24 during Mayday's Noah's Ark 10th Anniversary Evolution Remake Limited Edition Concert at the Rakuten Taoyuan Baseball Stadium in Taoyuan, Taiwan.

== Accolades ==
Awards and nominations for "The Sky"
Organization	Year	Award	Result	Ref.
Asian Pop Music Awards	2022	Top 20 Songs of the Year – Chinese	Won	
Asian Pop Music Awards	2022	Song of the Year – Chinese	Nominated	
Hito Pop Music Awards	2023	Top Ten Chinese Songs of the Year	Won	

== Credits and personnel ==
=== Recording ===
- Mixed at The Mastering Palace, New York City

=== Personnel ===
- G.E.M. – vocals, background vocals, producer
- Terrence Ma – producer, arranger
- Brian Paturalski – mixing
- Dave Kutch – mastering
- M9 Marginal Youth Singing Choir – background vocals
