= Fearless (G.E.M. EP) =

EP by G.E.M.
- Released: November 9, 2018
- Genre: Pop
- Length: 11:25
- Label: Hummingbird
- Producer: Lupo Groinig

G.E.M. chronology
My Fairytale (2018)	Fearless (2018)	Queen G (2018)

Singles from Fearless
- 1. "Woke" Released: October 18, 2018

Fearless (Chinese: 毒蘋果) is the fourth extended play (EP) by Hong Kong singer G.E.M., released on November 9, 2018, by Hummingbird Music. "Fearless" is the second EP of G.E.M.'s 2018 project of G.E.M.’s "Fairytale Trilogy," where each of the three E.P.’s will feature three new songs written by the singer herself.

== Track listing ==
Fearless track listing
No.	Title	Lyrics	Music	Length
1.	"Woke" (那一夜; Nà yīyè)	G.E.M.	G.E.M., Lupo Groinig	3:54
2.	"Fearless" (毒蘋果; Dú píngguǒ)	G.E.M.	G.E.M., Lupo Groinig	4:11
3.	"Unexpectedly" (突然之間; Túrán zhī jiān)	G.E.M.	G.E.M.	3:20
Total length:				11:25

== Credits and personnel ==
Credits from the liner notes of Happily Ever After.

- G.E.M. – vocals, background vocals, lyricist, composer
- Lupo Groinig – producer, keyboard, synths, programming
- Sam Vahdat – keyboard, synths, programming
- Richard Furch – mixing
- Reuben Cohen – mastering
- Tan Chang – executive producer, A&R, art direction
- Giselle Ukardi – graphic designer
