= X.X.X. Live Tour =

2013–15 concert tour by G.E.M.

- Tour by G.E.M.
- Hong Kong promotional handbill
- Location: Asia; Oceania; North America; Europe
- Associated album: Xposed
- Start date: April 12, 2013
- End date: November 22, 2015
- No. of shows: 73
- Attendance: 800,000

G.E.M. concert chronology
- Get Everybody Moving Concert (2011–12); X.X.X. Live Tour (2013–15); Queen of Hearts World Tour (2017–19)

X.X.X. Live Tour was the second concert tour by Chinese and Hong Kong singer-songwriter G.E.M., held in support of her third studio album, Xposed (2012). The tour began on April 12, 2013, in the singers native Hong Kong and continued throughout 2014 and 2015 travelling across China, Asia, North America before concluding the tour in London, England on November 22, 2015.

== Background ==
In April, she held five concerts in Hong Kong Coliseum, and became the youngest artist who has held 10 concerts in Hong Kong Coliseum. In late April, G.E.M. has started a study tour for three months, so the sixth show held in September. In November, she had released the second live album, "G.E.M. X.X.X. Live", which included three tracks, "Whether or Not", "Sometimes" and "My Secret".

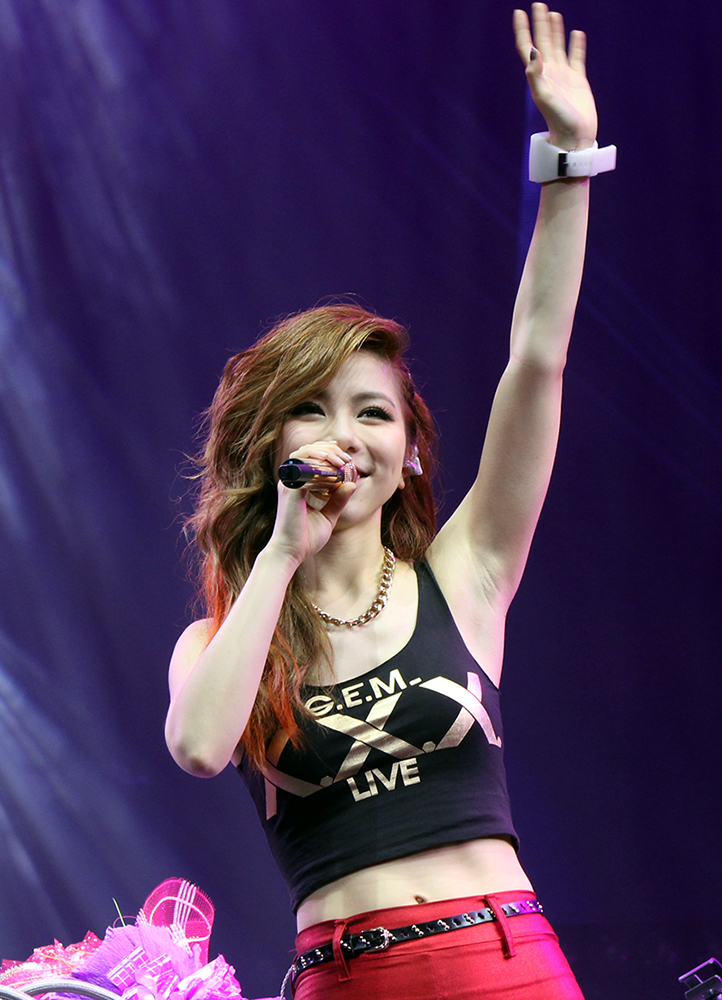
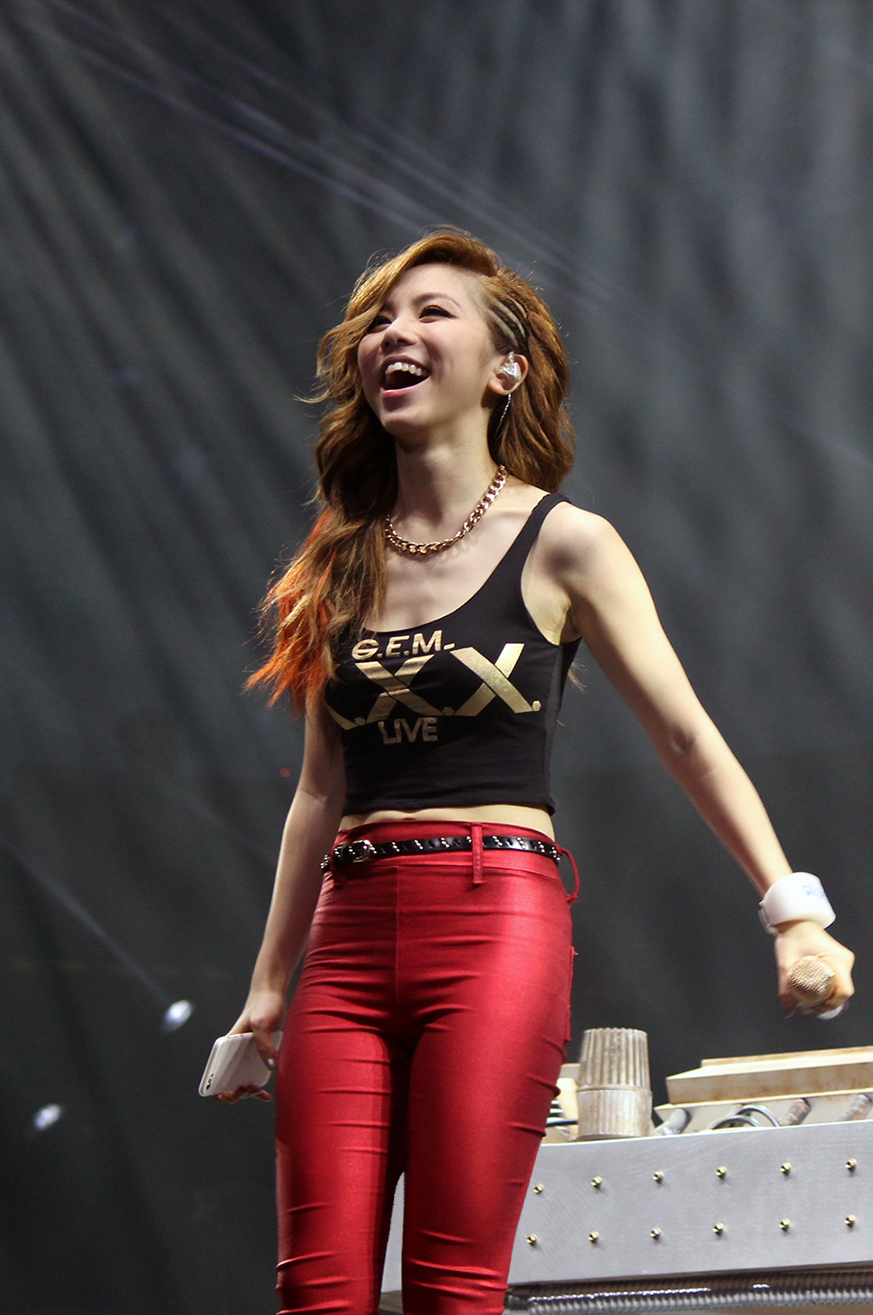
G.E.M. in Hong Kong in January 2015

Because of receiving the runner-up in I Am a Singer 2 in 2014, she had performed songs from the music TV show, I Am A Singer 2.The participation of the show helped her get famous in the Mainland China, hence, she held more concerts in China. She had finished 50 concerts under the age of 23 in August. In 2015, her concert in Taiwan was held successfully, 15,000 tickets had sold out within 4 hours.

On April 21, she held a press conference in Los Angeles and announced that she had cooperated with Live Nation, holding tour in America and Europe in November.

The 64th show in Beijing, was the first live concert that incorporated different mass media.

== Commercial performance ==
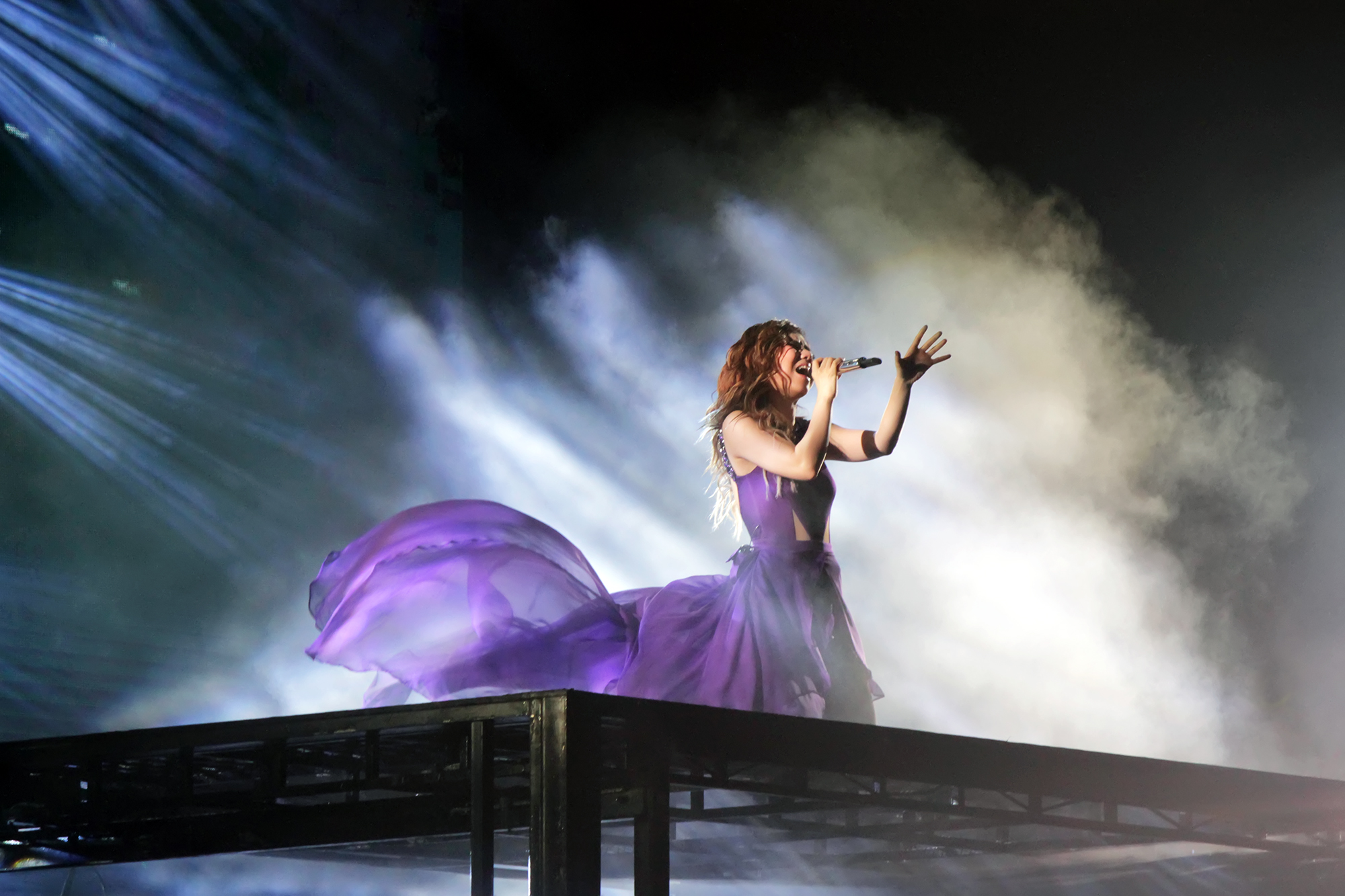
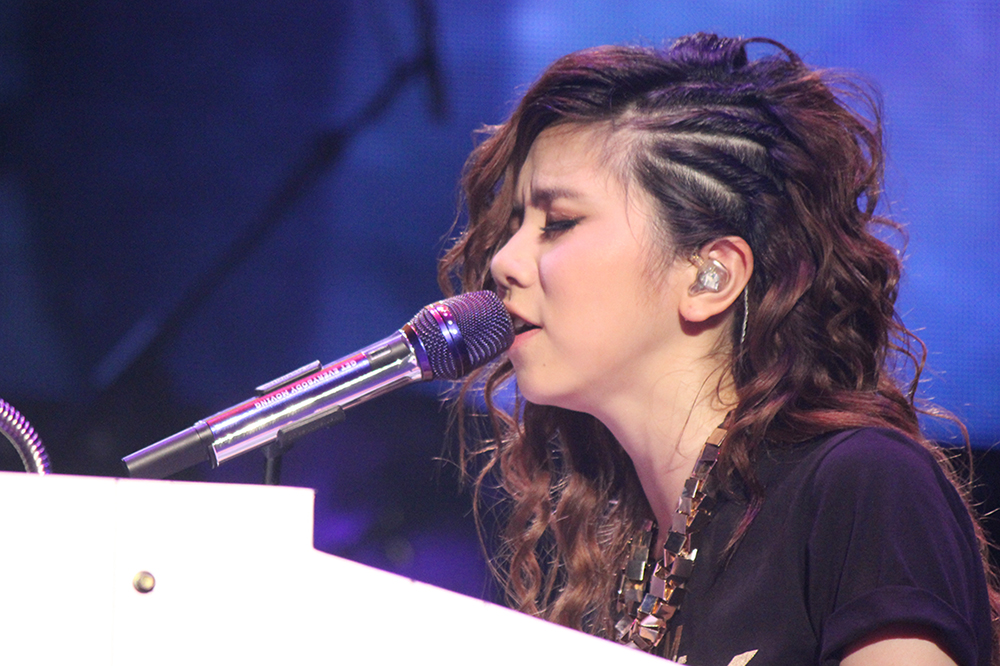
G.E.M. performing in Shanghai, during the encore (bottom)

The June 28, 2014, concert at the Shenzhen Bay Sports Centre in Shenzhen attracted an audience of 30,000 people and generated revenue of ¥20 million (US$3 million).

== Set list ==
This set list is from the concerts on July 4–6, 2014, in Shanghai, China. It is not intended to represent all shows throughout the tour.

Main set

1. After Tonight
2. One Button
3. Oh Boy
4. Cun Zai
5. Bubble
6. Ni Bu Shi Zhen Zheng De Kuai Le
7. Ni Ba Wo Guan Zui
8. Deng Yi Ge Ta
9. Wo De Mi Mi
10. Xia Yi Miao
11. Long Juan Feng / An Jing
12. Good to be Bad
13. A.I.N.Y.
14. Qian Yi Shi De Can Ku
15. Wo Yao Wo Men Zai Yi Qi
16. Ai Hen Jian Dan / Forever Love
17. Xiang Tian Zai Jie Wu Bai Nian
18. What Have U Done
19. Xiang Jiang Ni Zhi
20. G.E.M. / Rolling in the Deep

Encore

1. We Will Rock You / Yi Wu Suo You
2. Like You
3. Hui Yi De Sha Lou

== Shows ==
List of tour dates
Date	City	Country	Venue	Attendance
April 12, 2013	Hong Kong		Hong Kong Coliseum	—
April 13, 2013	Hong Kong		Hong Kong Coliseum	—
April 14, 2013	Hong Kong		Hong Kong Coliseum	—
April 15, 2013	Hong Kong		Hong Kong Coliseum	—
April 16, 2013	Hong Kong		Hong Kong Coliseum	—
September 21, 2013	Guangzhou	China	Guangzhou Gymnasium	9,000
February 13, 2014	Foshan	China	Lingan Mingzhu Gymnasium	—
May 1, 2014	Macau		Cotai Arena	—
May 2, 2014	Macau		Cotai Arena	—
May 3, 2014	Macau		Cotai Arena	—
May 10, 2014	Fuzhou	China	Strait Int'l Convention & Exhibition Centre	—
May 16, 2014	Beijing	China	Cadillac Arena	—
May 17, 2014	Beijing	China	Cadillac Arena	—
May 25, 2014	Wuhan	China	Wuhan Sports Center Gymnasium	—
May 31, 2014	Changsha	China	Hunan Int'l Convention & Exhibition Centre	—
June 28, 2014	Shenzhen	China	Shenzhen Bay Sports Centre	30,000
July 4, 2014	Shanghai	China	Mercedes-Benz Arena	—
July 5, 2014	Shanghai	China	Mercedes-Benz Arena	—
July 6, 2014	Shanghai	China	Mercedes-Benz Arena	—
July 11, 2014	Hangzhou	China	Yellow Dragon Gymnasium	—
July 12, 2014	Hangzhou	China	Yellow Dragon Gymnasium	—
July 17, 2014	Xi'an	China	Quijang Int'l Convention & Exhibition Centre	—
July 19, 2014	Harbin	China	HICEC Gymnasium	—
July 23, 2014	Dalian	China	Damai Centre	—
July 26, 2014	Tianjin	China	Tianjin Arena	—
July 31, 2014	Xiamen	China	Xiamen Stadium	—
August 2, 2014	Zhengzhou	China	Zhengzhou International Convention Centre	—
August 5, 2014	Perth	Australia	Crown Theatre	—
August 7, 2014	Sydney	Australia	Sydney Entertainment Centre	—
August 9, 2014	Melbourne	Australia	Melbourne Convention & Exhibition Centre	—
August 11, 2014	Auckland	New Zealand	The Trusts Arena	—
October 10, 2014	Shenyang	China	Shenyang Gymnasium	—
October 17, 2014	Guangzhou	China	Guangzhou International Sports Arena	—
October 18, 2014	Guangzhou	China	Guangzhou International Sports Arena	—
October 19, 2014	Guangzhou	China	Guangzhou International Sports Arena	—
October 25, 2014	Chengdu	China	Chengdu Sports Centre	30,000
November 1, 2014	Quanzhou	China	Strait Sports Centre	—
November 8, 2014	Nanjing	China	Nanjing Olympic Sports Centre Gymnasium	—
November 22, 2014	Nanning	China	Guangxi Gymnasium	—
November 29, 2014	Nanchang	China	Nanchang International Sports Centre Stadium	—
December 6, 2014	Jinan	China	Jinan Olympic Sports Centre Gymnasium	—
January 14, 2015	Hong Kong		Hong Kong Coliseum	—
January 15, 2015	Hong Kong		Hong Kong Coliseum	—
January 16, 2015	Hong Kong		Hong Kong Coliseum	—
January 17, 2015	Hong Kong		Hong Kong Coliseum	—
January 18, 2015	Hong Kong		Hong Kong Coliseum	—
January 23, 2015	Kuala Lumpur	Malaysia	Putra Indoor Stadium	—
January 24, 2015	Kuala Lumpur	Malaysia	Putra Indoor Stadium	—
January 30, 2015	Singapore		Singapore Expo	15,000
January 31, 2015	Singapore		Singapore Expo	15,000
February 1, 2015	Singapore		Singapore Expo	15,000
February 21, 2015	Las Vegas	United States	The Venetian Ballroom	—
February 28, 2015	Uncasville	United States	Mohegan Sun Arena	—
March 1, 2015	Uncasville	United States	Mohegan Sun Arena	—
March 12, 2015	Taipei	Taiwan	Taipei Arena	15,000
May 2, 2015	Kaohsiung	Taiwan	Kaohsiung Arena	—
May 9, 2015	Chongqing	China	Chongqing Int'l Convention & Exhibition Centre	—
May 16, 2015	Huizhou	China	Huizhou Olympic Stadium	—
May 23, 2015	Shanghai	China	Shanghai Stadium	—
May 30, 2015	Hefei	China	Binhu Int'l Convention & Exhibition Centre	—
July 10, 2015	Changchun	China	Wuhuan Gymnasium	—
July 18, 2015	Dongguan	China	Dongfeng Nissan Cultural and Sports Centre	—
July 25, 2015	Taiyuan	China	Shanxi Sports Centre	—
August 1, 2015	Beijing	China	Workers Stadium	40,000
October 23, 2015	Genting Highlands	Malaysia	Arena of Stars	—
October 24, 2015	Genting Highlands	Malaysia	Arena of Stars	—
November 3, 2015	Vancouver	Canada	Pacific Coliseum	—
November 6, 2015	San Jose	United States	SAP Center	—
November 7, 2015	Inglewood	United States	The Forum	—
November 11, 2015	Toronto	Canada	Air Canada Centre	—
November 15, 2015	Newark	United States	Prudential Center	—
November 18, 2015	Chicago	United States	Chicago Theatre	—
November 22, 2015	London	England	Wembley Arena	—
Total				800,000
