= Zhanjiang Sports Centre =

Multi-use stadium in Zhanjiang, Guangdong, China

Coordinates: 21°15′28″N 110°22′47″E

Zhanjiang Sports Centre (Chinese: 湛江体育中心) is a multi-use stadium in Zhanjiang, China. It is currently used mostly for football matches. The capacity of this stadium is 20,000.
