= Heartbeat (G.E.M. song) =

Single by G.E.M.

from the album Heartbeat
- Language: Mandarin
- Released: July 13, 2015
- Recorded: 2015
- Genre: Dance-pop
- Length: 3:37
- Label: Hummingbird Music
- Songwriter(s): G.E.M.
- Producer(s): Lupo Groinig

G.E.M. singles chronology
| "One Way Road" (2015) | "Heartbeat" (2015) | "Moment" (2015) |

Music video
- "Heartbeat" on YouTube

"Heartbeat" (Chinese: 新的心跳; pinyin: Xīn de xīntiào) is a song by Hong Kong singer-songwriter G.E.M., for her fourth studio album, Heartbeat (2015). It was released on July 13, 2015, by Hummingbird Music as the album's third single. Written by G.E.M. and produced by Austrian songwriter Lupo Groinig, "Heartbeat" is a dance-pop song with lyrics about rising above negativity.

== Background and release ==
"Heartbeat" was released as the titular single from G.E.M.'s album Heartbeat on July 13, 2015. The song is also the theme song of Shenzhen Satellite TV's reality show The Amazing Race Season 2.

== Writing and development ==
Discussing about writing the song, G.E.M. said, "I wrote my latest single, "Heartbeat," during Easter because during that particular period of time, I was facing a lot of negative comments online. Sometimes I still feel very fragile inside, but because it was Easter, a time where you’re suppose to start a new life, I wrote a song saying that every morning is a new day. Why do I have to still think about old stuff and be dragged down by it? It was very important for me to share this whole experience with my fans, because bullying is not something that just artists face every day."

== Music video ==
The music video for "Heartbeat" was filmed at Santa Monica High School in California and depicts school bullying. G.E.M. worked with American music video director Hannah Lux Davis for the video. The colorful music video, set in a typical high school, features several characters, all of them are the victims and high school bullies, and how they managed to achieve their aspirations. The singer herself played one of the characters as a bespectacled nerd.

== Accolades ==
Awards and nominations for "Heartbeat"
| Year | Organization | Award | Result | Ref. |
|---|---|---|---|---|
| 2015 | Hong Kong Pop Music MV Awards | Best MVs | Won | |
| 2016 | Global Chinese Golden Chart Awards | Top 20 Songs | Won | |
| 2016 | Global Chinese Pop Chart | Top 20 Songs | Won | |
| 2016 | RTHK Top 10 Gold Songs Awards | Best Mandarin Song | Nominated | |

== Credits and personnel ==
- G.E.M. – vocals, background vocals
- Lupo Groinig – producer, keys/synths & programming, executive producer
- Hannah Lux Davis – music video director

== Release history ==
Release dates and formats
| Region | Date | Format | Label |
|---|---|---|---|
| Various | July 13, 2015 | Digital download; streaming | Hummingbird Music |
