= Jinan Olympic Sports Center Gymnasium =

Sports venue in Jinan, Shandong, China

Jinan Olympic Sports Centre Gymnasium
- Interactive map of Jinan Olympic Sports Centre Gymnasium
- Full name: Jinan Olympic Sports Centre Gymnasium
- Location: Jinan, China
- Coordinates: 36°39′22″N 117°07′11″E
- Owner: Shandong Government
- Operator: Shandong Government
- Capacity: 12,226

Construction
- Groundbreaking: May 28, 2006
- Opened: 2009
- Cost: 元2.5 billion

Tenant
- 2009 National Games of the People's Republic of China

Jinan Olympic Sports Centre Gymnasium is an indoor sporting arena located in Jinan, China. The capacity of the arena is 12,000 spectators. It hosts indoor sporting events such as basketball, gymnastics, badminton and volleyball, and also hosted the indoor events of the 2009 National Games of the People's Republic of China.

== See also ==
- List of indoor arenas in China
