= My Secret =

Studio album by G.E.M.
- Released: October 28, 2010
- Recorded: 2010
- Genre: Pop; R&B
- Length: 42:00
- Language: Mandarin; Cantonese; English
- Label: Hummingbird

G.E.M. chronology
18... (2009)	My Secret (2010)	Xposed (2012)

Alternative cover
- Limited edition cover

Singles from My Secret
- 1. "My Secret" Released: October 28, 2010

My Secret (Chinese: 我的秘密; pinyin: Wǒ de mìmì) is the second studio album by Hong Kong singer-songwriter G.E.M., released on October 28, 2010, by Hummingbird Music. The album spawned the single of the same name.

== Release and promotion ==
The limited edition commemorative My Secret box set was released on November 1, 2010. A My Secret album signing event was held at Harbour City in Tsim Sha Tsui on November 14.

== Accolades ==
At the 2011 Chinese Music Awards, My Secret was awarded Outstanding Album and Outstanding Performance by a Female Singer. It also won Most Popular Album at the Metro Mandarin Power Awards, where G.E.M additionally won the Mandarin Female Singer award.

== Track listing ==
My Secret – Standard edition
No.	Title	Lyrics	Music	Length
1.	"One Button"	G.E.M.	Jade Ell, Mads Haugaard	3:45
2.	"Good to Be Bad"	G.E.M.	Peter Roberts	3:49
3.	"Get Over You"	G.E.M.	Blair Daly, Bridget Benenate, Chris Farren	3:57
4.	"In My Heart" (美好的旧时光; Měihǎo de jiù shíguāng)	G.E.M.	Lupo Groinig, G.E.M.	4:58
5.	"The Rose" (寂寞星球的玫瑰; Jìmò xīngqiú de méiguī)	G.E.M.	G.E.M.	4:46
6.	"The Voice Within"	G.E.M.	Gabriel Ssezibwa, Rene Prang, Niklas Nielsen, Lars Quang	3:27
7.	"My Secret" (我的秘密; Wǒ de mìmì)	G.E.M.	G.E.M.	4:10
8.	"The End" (末日; Mòrì)	G.E.M.	G.E.M.	4:43
9.	"Twinkle II"	G.E.M.	Jane Taylor, G.E.M.	4:17
10.	"Say It Loud"	G.E.M.	Lupo Groinig, G.E.M.	4:08
Total length:				42:00

== Charts ==
Chart performance for My Secret
Chart (2010)	Peak position
Hong Kong Albums (HKRMA)	1

== Release history ==
Release dates and formats for My Secret
Region	Date	Edition(s)	Format(s)	Label
Hong Kong	October 28, 2010	Standard edition	CD; digital download; streaming	Hummingbird Music
Hong Kong	November 1, 2010	Limited edition	CD	Hummingbird Music
China	December 30, 2010	Standard edition	CD	Hummingbird Music
