= Long Distance (G.E.M. song) =

Single by G.E.M.

from the album Heartbeat
- Language: Mandarin
- Released: February 18, 2015
- Genre: Pop
- Length: 3:37
- Label: Hummingbird Music
- Songwriter(s): G.E.M.
- Producer(s): Lupo Groinig

G.E.M. singles chronology
"Like You" (2014)	"Long Distance" (2015)	"One Way Road" (2015)

Music video
- "Long Distance" on YouTube

"Long Distance" (Chinese: 多遠都要在一起; pinyin: Duō yuǎn dōu yào zài yīqǐ; lit. Be together no matter how far away) is a song by Hong Kong singer-songwriter G.E.M., serving as the lead single for her fourth studio album, Heartbeat (2015). It was released for digital download and streaming on February 18, 2015, by Hummingbird Music. The song was written by G.E.M. and produced by Austrian songwriter Lupo Groinig. Musically, "Long Distance" is a pop number that features the keyboard as its primary instrumentation.

The accompanying music video for "Long Distance" was directed by Zhang Dan and was filmed in Hong Kong. It features actor Kang Kyung-joon as G.E.M.'s romantic interest. A commercial success, "Long Distance" won three accolades at regional award ceremonies, including Song of the Year and the Most Popular Mandarin Song at the Metro Radio Mandarin Music Awards and Top 10 Songs at the Migu Music Awards. G.E.M. performed the song at several award ceremonies upon its release and included it on the set lists of two of her world tours.

== Background and release ==
"Long Distance" was released as the first single from G.E.M.'s fourth studio album Heartbeat, on February 18, 2015. G.E.M. stated that the song encapsulates the idea that love has the power to bridge any distance, no matter how great, and expressed a desire to portray emotions of affection, comfort, and an uplifting spirit.

== Music video ==
The music video for "Long Distance" was filmed in Hong Kong. It was directed by Zhang Dan and features G.E.M. alongside South Korean actor Kang Kyung-joon. The production schedule was rigorous, commencing at 8 a.m. and concluding at 2 a.m. the following day.

== Live performances ==
On the same day as the release of "Long Distance", G.E.M. gave a performance of the song at the 2015 CCTV Spring Festival Gala.

== Track listing ==
- Digital download / streaming
1. "Long Distance" – 3:37

== Accolades ==
Awards and nominations for "Long Distance"
Year	Organization	Award	Result	Ref.
2015	Metro Radio Mandarin Music Awards	Song of the Year	Won	
2015	Metro Radio Mandarin Music Awards	Most Popular Mandarin Song	Won	
2016	Migu Music Awards	Top 10 Songs	Won	

== Credits and personnel ==
- G.E.M. – vocals, background vocals
- Lupo Groinig – producer, keys/synths & programming, executive producer
- Zhang Dan – music video director

== Charts ==
=== Weekly charts ===
Chart (2024)	Peak position
Malaysia Chinese Singles (RIM)	7

== Release history ==
Release dates and formats
Region	Date	Format	Version	Label
Various	February 18, 2015	Digital download; streaming	Original version	Hummingbird Music
Various	September 30, 2016	Digital download; streaming	Dub mix	Hummingbird Music
