= Heartbeat (G.E.M. album) =

- Digital cover artwork

Studio album by G.E.M.
- Released: November 6, 2015
- Recorded: 2013–2015
- Genre: Pop
- Length: 38:45
- Language: Mandarin
- Label: Hummingbird; Forward Music
- Producer: Lupo Groinig

G.E.M. chronology
The Best of 2008–2012 (2013)	Heartbeat (2015)	25 Looks (2016)

Singles from Heartbeat
- 1. "Long Distance" Released: February 18, 2015; 2. "One Way Road" Released: April 20, 2015; 3. "Heartbeat" Released: July 22, 2015; 4. "Moments" Released: September 16, 2015; 5. "Goodbye" Released: October 30, 2015; 6. "Away" Released: November 4, 2015

Heartbeat (Chinese: 新的心跳; pinyin: Xīn de xīntiào) is the fourth studio album by Hong Kong singer-songwriter G.E.M., released in both digital and physical formats on November 6, 2015, by Hummingbird Music. Her first album to be recorded entirely in Mandarin, its lyrics were written solely by G.E.M. whilst production was handled by Austrian musician Lupo Groinig, who had previously produced for the singer on her previous albums. A limited edition vinyl of the album was made available in Hong Kong in December 2015.

Heartbeat serves as a reflection of G.E.M.'s personal journey from 2013 to 2015, including experiences that expanded her perspectives on life, romance, and relationships. Musically, it is primarily a pop and dance record that contains influences from electronic music, rock, and R&B. The album received positive reviews from music critics, who lauded its production, composition, and G.E.M.'s vocal delivery. In Hong Kong, it peaked at number one on the Hong Kong Record Merchants Association (HKRMA) album sales chart.

The album won various accolades, including Best Selling Mandarin Album and Top 10 Best Selling Albums at the IFPI Hong Kong Sales Awards, Top Album at the QQ Music Awards, and Best Mandarin Album at the Migu Music Awards. In support of the release, G.E.M. embarked on her second world tour titled the Queen of Hearts World Tour in April 2017. It spanned 48 shows across Asia, North America, and Oceania before its conclusion in April 2019.

Heartbeat featured six singles, all accompanied by music videos, with the lead single "Long Distance" released in February 2015. The titular single "Heartbeat" was made available in July. "Goodbye" and "Away" premiered in the week leading up to the album's release, with both music videos amassing over 100 million views on YouTube.

== Background and release ==
Heartbeat is an album that G.E.M. produced over a period of three years, with all the lyrics and music written by her. The album breaks away from the traditional pattern of publicity and distribution by releasing the singles and music videos for free on all major online platforms before the release of the physical album, which also marks the first audiovisual album by G.E.M..

Heartbeat is G.E.M.'s retrospection and remembrance of her life from 2013 to 2015, during which there were so many profound stories that made her discover new things about the world, which drove her to write the whole album. She also admits that the resonance of her audience reminds her of the feelings she had when she was writing these songs, and that her mindset is more positive and open. The first song G.E.M. wrote for the album was "One Way Road" when she was in London. She felt that life is like a train, you have to make choices and you can't go back. Faced with the pressure of public opinion at the time, G.E.M. wrote "Heartbeat" with an open mind to complete her self-refurbishment. "Long Distance" is a song composed by G.E.M. on a lonely night, expressing longing for the distance. When composing the song "Away," G.E.M. used the song as a metaphor for an emotional experience that ended in nothing. "Blindspot" is a song written for parents.

"I have been to many places and met many faces. I have lost loved ones and gained precious ones. This time, I wrote all the lyrics and music for the album because there are so many intersecting emotions and profound stories. It has made me discover new things about the world and given my life a new heartbeat."

— G.E.M. on Heartbeat

The inspiration for "Moments" came from a dream G.E.M. had. When she woke up from the dream, she had the lyrics "Time never returns, memories always dissipate, looking back in a daze, we were happy but briefly" in her head, so she started to compile those lyrics and write the song the next day. "Chuck Close" is a song written by her inspired by Chuck Close, a painter who suffers from prosopagnosia. "Against the Wind" is written about G.E.M.'s real experience. She was unwilling to follow the trend and insisted on her own principles, and finally created the song in this state of mind.

== Composition ==
"Long Distance" is accompanied by piano and G.E.M.'s voice, expressing that no matter how far apart we are, distance cannot stop people from wanting to be together. "Goodbye" adopts the rock music style, with the theme of the beginning and end of love. The title track of the album, "Heartbeat", speaks directly to the heart and conveys a kind of exciting upward energy. "Away" is a blend of electro and rock elements, conveying a tearing sense of pain, and the explosive high notes in the chorus release all the emotions contained in the song, which expresses the heartfelt feelings of many people who are troubled by love.

The arrangement of "Therefore" combines elements of world music, new age music and pop-electronic music. The song opens with a disorienting vocal chant, the new century inspired title track accentuates Tang's strong vocals, the chorus adds an electronic rhythm to bring up the mood, and finally returns to the vocal chant. The song "Moments" is richer in its vocal style, with G.E.M.'s tone and voice being emotive and full of texture.

== Release and promotion ==
G.E.M. held a press conference for the release of Heartbeat at the Zhengyici Peking Opera Theatre in Beijing on October 29, 2015, announcing that before the release of the physical album on November 6, one new song and music video would be released every day, giving fans free access. From the press conference, she revealed the music video of her new song "Goodbye," and from November 2 to November 6, she would decide to reveal one song every day, so that fans can have Easter eggs and countdown surprises every day before the release of the album. She also announced that she would release a limited edition of 1,000 vinyls for her fans to collect.

After the album was released, its sales topped the iTunes Hot Album Chart in nine regions. In 2015, it reached number 41 and number 7 on the album sales chart of Kuang Nan and Five Music, respectively.

=== Live performances ===
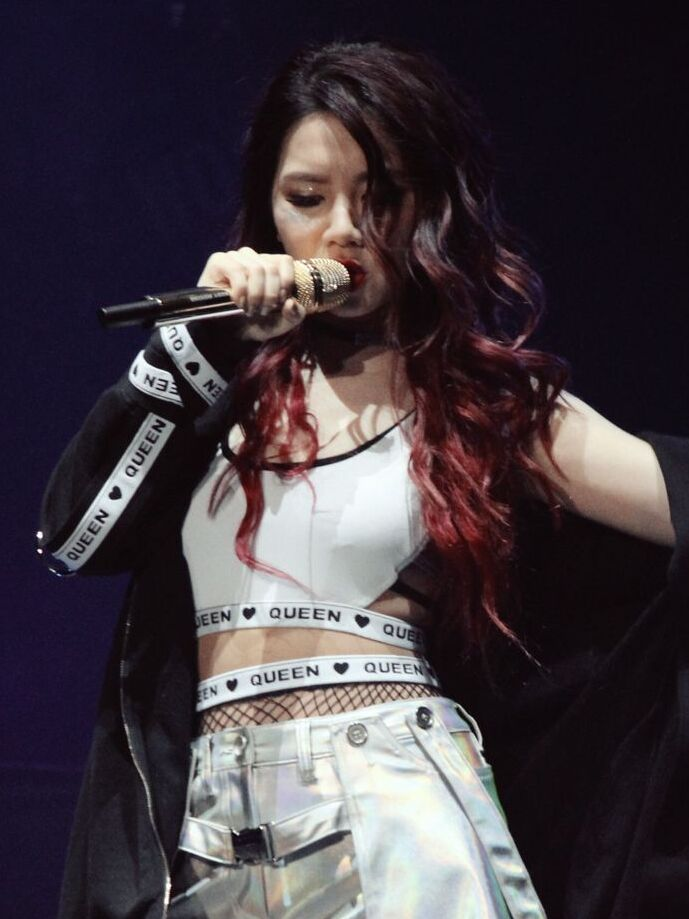
G.E.M. performing during the opening show of the Queen of Hearts World Tour in Guangzhou

On February 18, 2015, G.E.M. participated in the 2015 CCTV Spring Festival Gala and played and sang the song "Long Distance." On April 18, she served as a guest performer at the "Yu Nifang Membrane Goddess" concert at the Hunan International Convention and Exhibition Center. G.E.M. performed at the opening ceremony for the Taipingyuan International Furniture Expo City on April 29. On May 19, she was a guest performer at the China Micro-Business Integrity Pledge Conference in Guangzhou. On July 16, 2015, G.E.M. was one of the guest performers at the "King of Singers and Good Voices" concert at the Shenzhen Stadium.

In April 2017, G.E.M. embarked on the Queen of Hearts World Tour in support of the album, which began at the Guangzhou International Sports Arena. It spanned 48 dates in Asia, North America, and Oceania. Initially planned to extend further, the tour ended at the Kaohsiung Arena in April 2019, following G.E.M.'s legal conflicts with Hummingbird Music.

== Accolades ==
Awards and nominations for Heartbeat
Year	Organization	Award	Result	Ref.
2016	Global Chinese Golden Chart Awards	Most Recommended Album	Won	
2016	Golden Melody Awards	Best Vocal Recording Album	Nominated	
2016	IFPI Hong Kong Sales Awards	Top 10 Best Selling Albums	Won	
2016	IFPI Hong Kong Sales Awards	Best Selling Mandarin Album	Won	
2016	Ku Music Awards	Best Singer Hong Kong/Taiwan	Won	
2016	Migu Music Awards	Best Mandarin Album	Won	
2016	QQ Music Awards	Top Album	Won	
2016	Top 10 Songs and Albums Awards	Top 10 Albums	Won	

== Track listing ==
All songs are written by G.E.M. and produced by Lupo Groinig.

Heartbeat track listing
No.	Title	Length
1.	"Long Distance" (多遠都要在一起; Duō yuǎn dōu yào zài yīqǐ)	3:36
2.	"Goodbye" (再見; Zàijiàn)	3:37
3.	"Heartbeat" (新的心跳; Xīn de xīntiào)	3:26
4.	"Away" (来自天堂的魔鬼; Láizì tiāntáng de móguǐ)	4:05
5.	"Blindspot" (盲點; Mángdiǎn)	3:46
6.	"One Way Road" (單行的軌道; Dānxíng de guǐdào)	4:08
7.	"Against the Wind" (一路逆風; Yīlù nìfēng)	3:45
8.	"Therefore" (於是; Yúshì)	3:49
9.	"Moment" (瞬間; Shùnjiān)	4:06
10.	"Chuck Close" (查克靠近; Chá kè kàojìn)	4:20
Total length:		38:45

== Charts ==
Chart performance for Heartbeat
Chart (2015)	Peak position
Hong Kong Albums (HKRMA)	1

== Release history ==
Release dates and formats for Heartbeat
Region	Date	Format	Edition	Label
Hong Kong	November 6, 2015	CD; digital download; streaming	Standard	Hummingbird; Forward Music
China	November 6, 2015	CD; digital download; streaming	Standard	Hummingbird; Forward Music
Taiwan	November 6, 2015	CD; digital download; streaming	Standard	Hummingbird; Forward Music
Malaysia	November 6, 2015	CD; digital download; streaming	Standard	Hummingbird; Forward Music
Hong Kong	December 23, 2015	Vinyl LP	Limited	Hummingbird; Forward Music
