= Goodbye (G.E.M. song) =

Single by G.E.M.

from the album Heartbeat
- Language: Mandarin
- Released: October 30, 2015
- Recorded: 2015
- Studio: Henson Recording Studios (Los Angeles)
- Genre: Pop rock
- Length: 3:26
- Label: Hummingbird Music
- Songwriter(s): G.E.M.
- Producer(s): Lupo Groinig

G.E.M. singles chronology
"Moments" (2015)	"Goodbye" (2015)	"Away" (2015)

Music video
- "Goodbye" on YouTube

"Goodbye" (Chinese: 再見; pinyin: Zàijiàn) is a song by Hong Kong singer-songwriter G.E.M., serving as the fifth single for her fourth studio album Heartbeat (2015). A pop rock number, "Goodbye" was written by G.E.M. and produced by long-time collaborator Lupo Groinig. It was released via digital download and streaming on October 30, 2015, by Hummingbird Music.

== Music video ==
The music video for "Goodbye" was directed by Shane Drake, who had previously worked with artists such as Avril Lavigne, Paramore, and Fall Out Boy. The video features G.E.M. performing atop a building in downtown Los Angeles, while the male lead hears her play from his bedroom within the same building. Intrigued by her melodious voice, he runs around the city in an attempt to locate her. His search leads him to the rooftop, only to discover her absence, with a note reading "Goodbye" as the sole trace of her presence.

=== Piano version ===
G.E.M. simultaneously filmed the music video for the piano rendition of "Goodbye" during a live recording session at the Henson Recording Studios in Los Angeles. The final cut of the video was crafted using footage from this recording session.

== Live performances ==
G.E.M. performed "Goodbye" at The 4th V Chart Awards at the Cadillac Arena in Beijing, China on April 4, 2016.

== Track listing ==
- Digital download / streaming
1. "Goodbye" – 3:26

== Credits and personnel ==
- G.E.M. – vocals, background vocals
- Lupo Groinig – producer
- Richard Furch – mixing
- Reuben Cohen – mastering
- Shane Drake – music video director

== Charts ==
"Goodbye" (Piano version)
Chart (2016)	Peak position
China Airplay (Billboard Radio)	4

== Release history ==
Release history and formats
Country	Date	Format	Version	Label
Various	October 30, 2015	Digital download; streaming	Original version	Hummingbird Music
Various	May 23, 2016	Digital download; streaming	Piano version	Hummingbird Music
Various	September 30, 2016	Digital download; streaming	Club remix	Hummingbird Music
