= G.E.M. =

Hong Kong singer (born 1991)

- 鄧紫棋
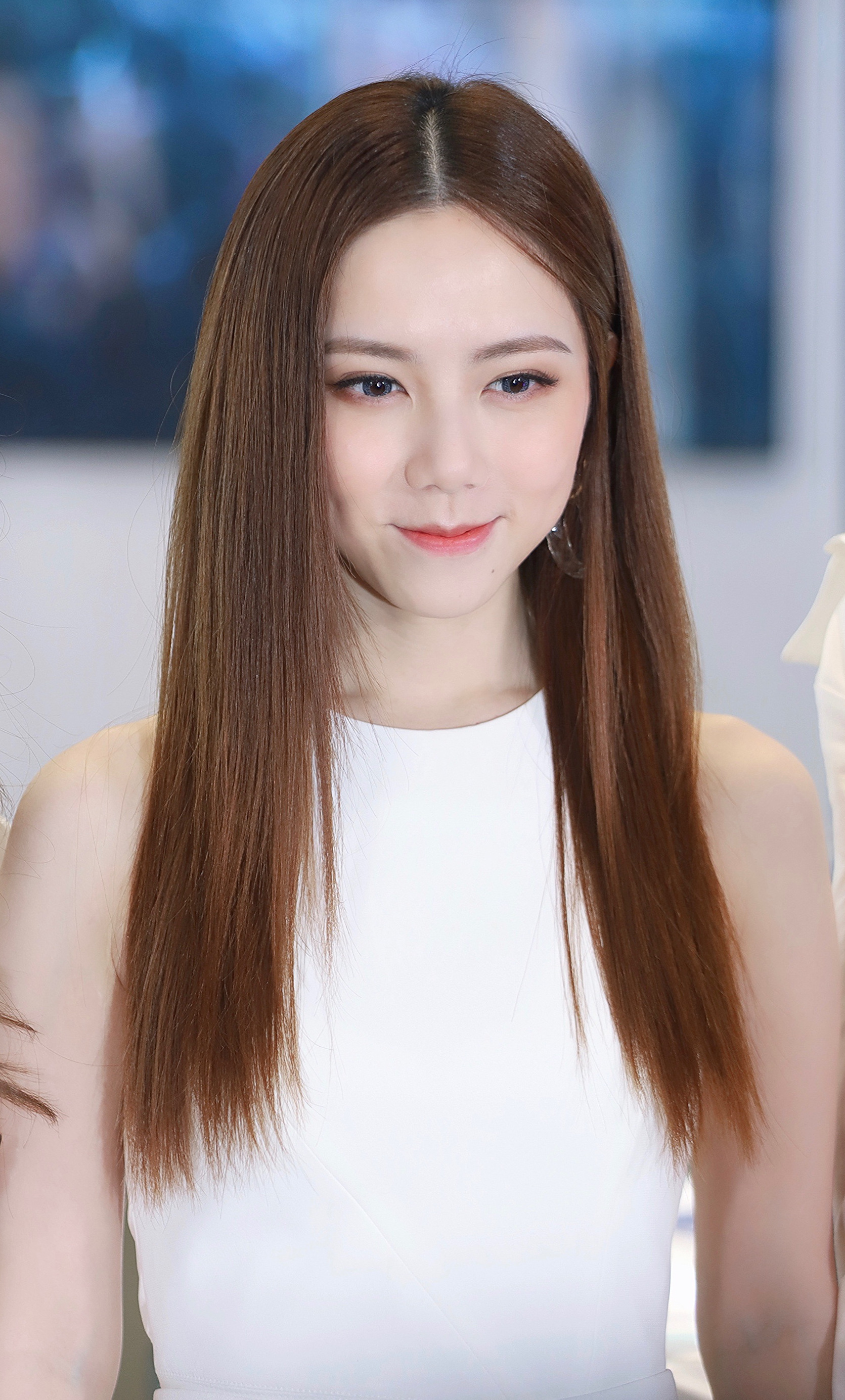
- G.E.M. in 2021
- Born: Gloria Tang Sze-wing; 16 August 1991 (age 35); Shanghai, China
- Occupations: Singer; songwriter; record producer; actress; investor
- Years active: 2008–present
- Works: Albums and singles; concerts
- Awards: Full list
- Musical career
- Also known as: Tang Tsz-kei
- Origin: Hong Kong
- Genres: Pop; dance-pop; R&B
- Instruments: Vocals; piano; guitar; drums
- Labels: Hummingbird; Sony Music; Warner

Chinese name
- Traditional Chinese: 鄧紫棋
- Simplified Chinese: 邓紫棋
Transcriptions
Standard Mandarin
- Hanyu Pinyin: Dèng Zǐqí
Yue: Cantonese
- Jyutping: Dang^{6} Zi^{2}kei^{4}
- Hong Kong Romanisation: Tang Tsz-kei

Birth name
- Traditional Chinese: 鄧詩穎
- Simplified Chinese: 邓诗颖
Transcriptions
Standard Mandarin
- Hanyu Pinyin: Dèng Shīyǐng
Yue: Cantonese
- Jyutping: Dang^{6} Si^{1}wing^{6}
- Hong Kong Romanisation: Tang Sze-wing

Gloria Tang Sze-wing (Note: Chinese: 鄧詩穎; pinyin: Dèng Shīyǐng; Jyutping: Dang^{6} Si^{1}wing^{6}; [tɐŋ˨ si˥ wɪŋ˨]) (born 16 August 1991), known professionally as G.E.M. (backronym of Get Everybody Moving) or Tang Tsz-kei, (Note: Chinese: 鄧紫棋; pinyin: Dèng Zǐqí; Jyutping: Dang^{6} Zi^{2}kei^{4}; [tɐŋ˨ tsi˧˥ kʰej˩]) is a Hong Kong singer, songwriter, and producer. Born in Shanghai and raised in Hong Kong, G.E.M. is known for her vocal performances, autobiographical songwriting, and musical versatility. She is recognized as a leading figure in Chinese popular music and among the most known artists in the Greater China region.

G.E.M. debuted under Hummingbird Music in 2008 with the release of her self-titled Cantonese extended play, G.E.M., which won her the gold award for best newcomer at three major award ceremonies in Hong Kong. Her debut studio album, 18... (2009), was recorded in both Mandarin and Cantonese and was named one of the top ten best-selling records in the territory in 2009. Xposed (2012) was named the best-selling Mandarin album of the year and made her the youngest nominee for Best Female Mandarin Singer in the history of the Golden Melody Awards. In 2014, her appearance on the Chinese singing competition I Am a Singer 2 gained her immense popularity in Greater China.

G.E.M. subsequently released her first Mandarin studio album, titled Heartbeat (2015), which produced the singles "Long Distance", "Goodbye", and "Away". The following year, she released the single "Light Years Away" as the Chinese theme song for the film Passengers, which remains the most viewed music video by a Chinese artist on YouTube. In March 2019, G.E.M. departed from Hummingbird after 11 years following a highly-publicized contractual dispute, and subsequently launched her own company G-Nation. She found continued success with City Zoo (2019) and Revelation (2022), both of which topped the Hong Kong album charts. Her I Am Gloria World Tour (2023–2026) grossed over $424 million in revenue across 86 shows, making it among the top-five highest-grossing tours by a female artist of all-time.

G.E.M. has won numerous accolades throughout her career, including sixteen IFPI Hong Kong Sales Awards, twelve RTHK Top 10 Gold Songs Awards, thirteen Metro Radio Mandarin Music Awards, one Golden Melody Award, and one MTV Europe Music Award. In 2016, G.E.M. became the only Asian artist featured on the Forbes 30 Under 30 list, and in 2018, she was included at number 34 on BBC's 100 Women list of the most influential women in the world.

== Early life ==
Tang Sze-wing was born on 16 August 1991, in Shanghai, China; she was given the English name Gloria by her father. Her father is from Hong Kong, and her mother is from Shanghai. She has a sister who is four years younger than her. G.E.M. spent her childhood at Caoyang New Village and lived with her maternal grandmother who died in March 2011. She moved to Hong Kong with her parents at the age of four. She attended Christian schools for her education.

G.E.M. grew up with a musical background, her mother being an alumnus of the Vocal Music department of Shanghai Conservatory of Music, her grandmother was a vocal coach, her grandfather was a saxophonist in an orchestra, and her uncle was a violinist. G.E.M. started to write songs at the age of five. She would play a few practice songs and improvise them herself. She was featured in a performance on Hong Kong's Educational Television at the age of seven. She achieved ABRSM's piano grade 8 at the age of thirteen. G.E.M. names Christina Aguilera, Beyoncé, and Mariah Carey as her influences.

In 2006, G.E.M. won the champion in the singing competition titled Spice It Up, and caught the attention of Chang Tan (張丹), who offered her a recording deal with Hummingbird Music. She then became a professional singer at the age of 16. She graduated from Heep Woh Primary School and True Light Girls' College with a score of 21 points in HKCEE. In 2008, she attended Hong Kong Academy for Performing Arts, but dropped out in 2009 due to her decision to focus on her singing career.

== Career ==
=== 2008–2010: G.E.M., 18..., and MySecret ===
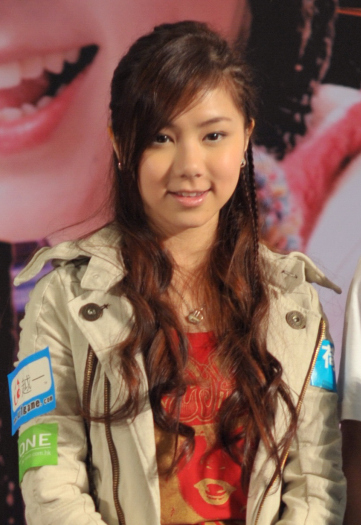
G.E.M. at an event in Plaza Hollywood, 2009

In October 2008, G.E.M. released her debut self-titled EP G.E.M. which included two Mandarin songs and three Cantonese songs. She won a series of awards for the album, and was dubbed the "Girl with Giant Lungs" and "Young Diva with Giant Lungs" for her vocal range. In May 2009, G.E.M. travelled to Los Angeles to record her first studio album, 18..., which was released in October 2009. In November 2009, she held her first concert G.E.M. 18 Live 2009 at Hong Kong International Trade and Exhibition Centre, and the concert featured special guests including Jan Lamb and Justin Lo. In the same year, she also held a concert in Toronto. In 2010, G.E.M. went to Taiwan to promote the album 18... and then returned to Los Angeles to record her next studio album, MySecret, which was released in October 2010.

=== 2011–2012: Get Everybody Moving Tour and Xposed ===
In May 2011, G.E.M. performed a three-day concerts titled Get Everybody Moving Tour in Hong Kong Coliseum, and became the youngest Hong Kong female artist to perform in the venue. She then performed another five concerts in the same venue in September and embarked a concert tour in eight countries.

In June 2012, she performed alongside Jason Mraz and Khalil Fong at the iTunes Live in Hong Kong, and sang "Lucky" with Jason Mraz. Her third studio album, Xposed, was released in July 2012. G.E.M. wrote the record based on her growth experience and life insights in the two years since her previous album, My Secret. After its official release, the album reached number one on the sales charts of major record stores in Hong Kong, including HMV and CD Warehouse. In debuted at number one on the Hong Kong Record Merchants Association (HKRMA) album chart, with the second and third places occupied by Maroon 5 and Linkin Park. It remained atop the sales chart for a second week.

The lead single, "What Have U Done", peaked number one on all four pop music charts in Hong Kong. The album's other singles included "Oh Boy, "Someday I'll Fly", and "Bubble". On 8 July 2012, she held a signing event at apm shopping mall in Kwun Tong, Hong Kong, attracting nearly 1,000 people. On 28 July, G.E.M. held her first concert in Taiwan at the Red House in Ximen. On 19 November, G.E.M.'s first official mobile app was released.

=== 2013–2015: X.X.X. Live Tour, I Am a Singer, and Heartbeat ===
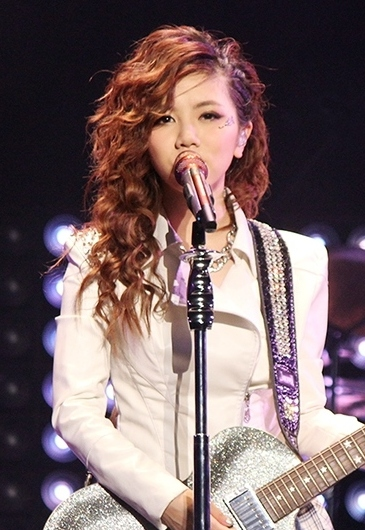
G.E.M. performing in Shanghai in 2014

G.E.M. embarked on her X.X.X. Live World Tour in April 2013, in support of her third studio album, Xposed. The tour started with five shows in Hong Kong Coliseum, and ended with a show at Wembley Arena in London, which is also her debut show in Europe. There was a total of 73 shows in 4 continents, and the tour attracted a total of 800,000 people. In May, she became the youngest nominee ever of Golden Melody Award for Best Female Vocalist Mandarin, with her album Xposed. In June, she released a cover of Chinese smash hit Intoxicated, which was played for 15 million times on QQ Music within a week.

In January 2014, she appeared in the second season of Hunan TV's I Am a Singer 2 alongside Han Lei, Zhou Bichang, Phil Chang, Gary Chaw and others, which was broadcast to over 200 million people. Her second-place finish gained her immense popularity and fame in Greater China. In the same year, she earned a World Music Award nomination for World's Best Female Artist and an MTV Europe Music Award nomination for Best Mainland China & Hong Kong Act. In December 2014, G.E.M.'s wax figure at Madame Tussauds Hong Kong was unveiled. On 10 February 2015, JJ Lin published the official music video for his song "Beautiful" (手心的薔薇) featuring G.E.M., which was included on his album Genesis (2014).

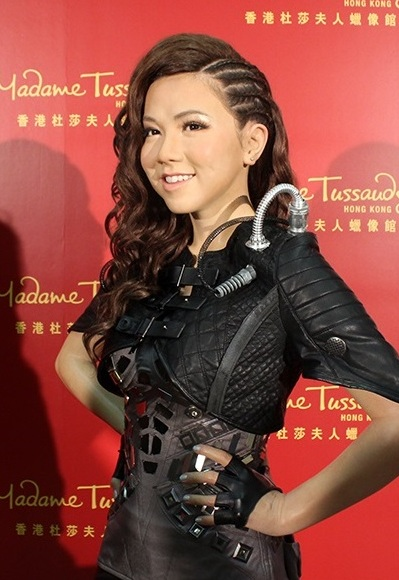
G.E.M.'s wax figure on display at Madame Tussauds Hong Kong

In early May of the same year, G.E.M. was ranked at number 11 on the Forbes China Power 100 Celebrity List. With an annual income of ¥62 million, she ranked first among artists born in the 1990s or later. In September 2015, she was selected to be the team advisor for team Wang Feng at The Voice of China 4. In November 2015, she appeared on the cover of China's Apple Music, and released her studio album Heartbeat with music videos of all ten tracks in the album. The album topped the iTunes chart in China.

=== 2016–2018: G-Force and Queen of Hearts Tour ===
In 2016, she appeared on the list of Forbes 30 Under 30 (Music), being the only Asian musician on the list. In the same year, she was asked to voice a lead role in the animated film Charming, alongside Demi Lovato, Ashley Tisdale, and Avril Lavigne. She also performed at Heroes of Remix that same year, singing EDM versions of songs such as "Loving You" (喜歡你) and "The Brightest Star In The Night Sky" (夜空中最亮的星), among others. In September 2016, she released her photobook 25 Looks and an EP, which includes four remix songs. In November 2016, she earned an MTV Europe Music Award for Best Mainland China & Hong Kong Act.

On 29 December 2016, G.E.M. released the Chinese theme song for the science fiction film Passengers titled "Light Years Away", which she also performed on several occasions, including NASA 2019 Breakthrough Prize. Lyrically, similar to the plot of the film itself, it speaks of a doomed love. The song reached number one on the Billboard Radio China Top 10 Chart, where it remained for two consecutive weeks. On its year-end annual chart ranking the top songs of the year, "Light Years Away" ranked at number four in 2017.

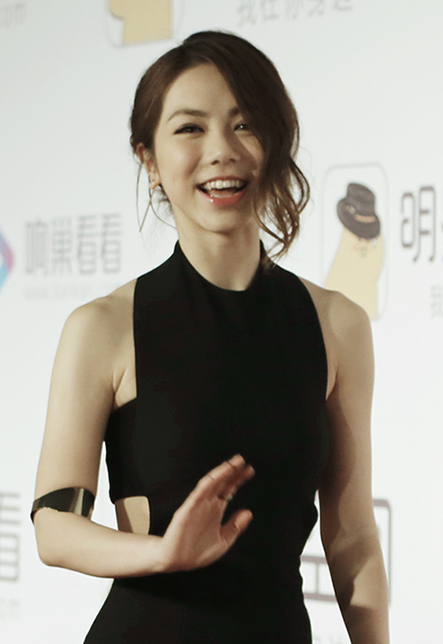
G.E.M. in April 2016

In May 2017, G.E.M released her first documentary G-Force, which was directed by Nick Wickham. In April 2017, she embarked on her Queen of Hearts World Tour. In June, G.E.M. released the single "Peach Blossom Promise" as the theme song for the Chinese television drama A Life Time Love. It peaked at number one on the Billboard Radio China Top 10 Chart for two non-consecutive weeks. On 21 October 2017, Chinese-Malaysian hip hop artist Namewee published a video featuring her in a cover of his song "Stranger in the North (KTV Version)" (漂向北方), which had received widespread popularity, where she sings the chorus which was originally performed by Taiwanese-American singer-songwriter Wang Leehom.

At the 13th Annual KKBox Music Awards on 21 January 2018, G.E.M. and Namewee together sang "Stranger in the North" immediately after she sang "Goodbye" (再見) and "Light Years Away" for her 2018 KKBox Artist of the Year award-winner performance. On April, she was invited to be the duet partner for Hua Chenyu in the finals of Singer 2018 and sang "Light Years Away". On 18 August 2018, her Queen of Hearts World Tour has called for an end for part 1 of the tour and she announced the part 2 tour will hold in 2019 with more new songs.

=== 2018–2021: Fairytale Trilogy project, Queen of Hearts Tour Part 2, and City Zoo ===
In 2018, G.E.M announced that she would be working on a project, Fairytale Trilogy, where each of the three EP's will feature three new songs written by herself, and produced by Lupo Groinig. The first EP, My Fairytale, with the lead single "Tik Tok" was released digitally on Chinese streaming platforms on 16 August and officially released worldwide on the 30th. The song reached number one on both the Billboard Radio China Top 10 Chart and the TME UNI Chart, and number two on the Billboard China Top 100 chart. On 4 November, G.E.M. was invited to perform the song "Light Years Away" and served as on-stage presenter in the Breakthrough Prize, being the first ever Chinese singer to perform at the ceremony. On 19 November, she was selected as one of the BBC 100 Women, being the only Chinese on the list. On 22 November, the number of subscribers of her official YouTube channel "GEMblog" exceeded 1 million.

On 26 October, the second EP, Fearless, with the single "Woke", was released digitally on Chinese streaming platforms and worldwide on 9 November. On 14 December, the third and final EP from the project, Queen G, with the lead single "Love Finds a Way", was released on Chinese streaming platforms and worldwide on 28 December. On the year-end Billboard Radio China chart for 2018, two of G.E.M's songs appeared in the top 10—"Tik Tok" at number six, and "Woke" at number eight. After gaining some more new commercial endorsements, G.E.M. composed and recorded new commercial songs in Los Angeles in early 2019.

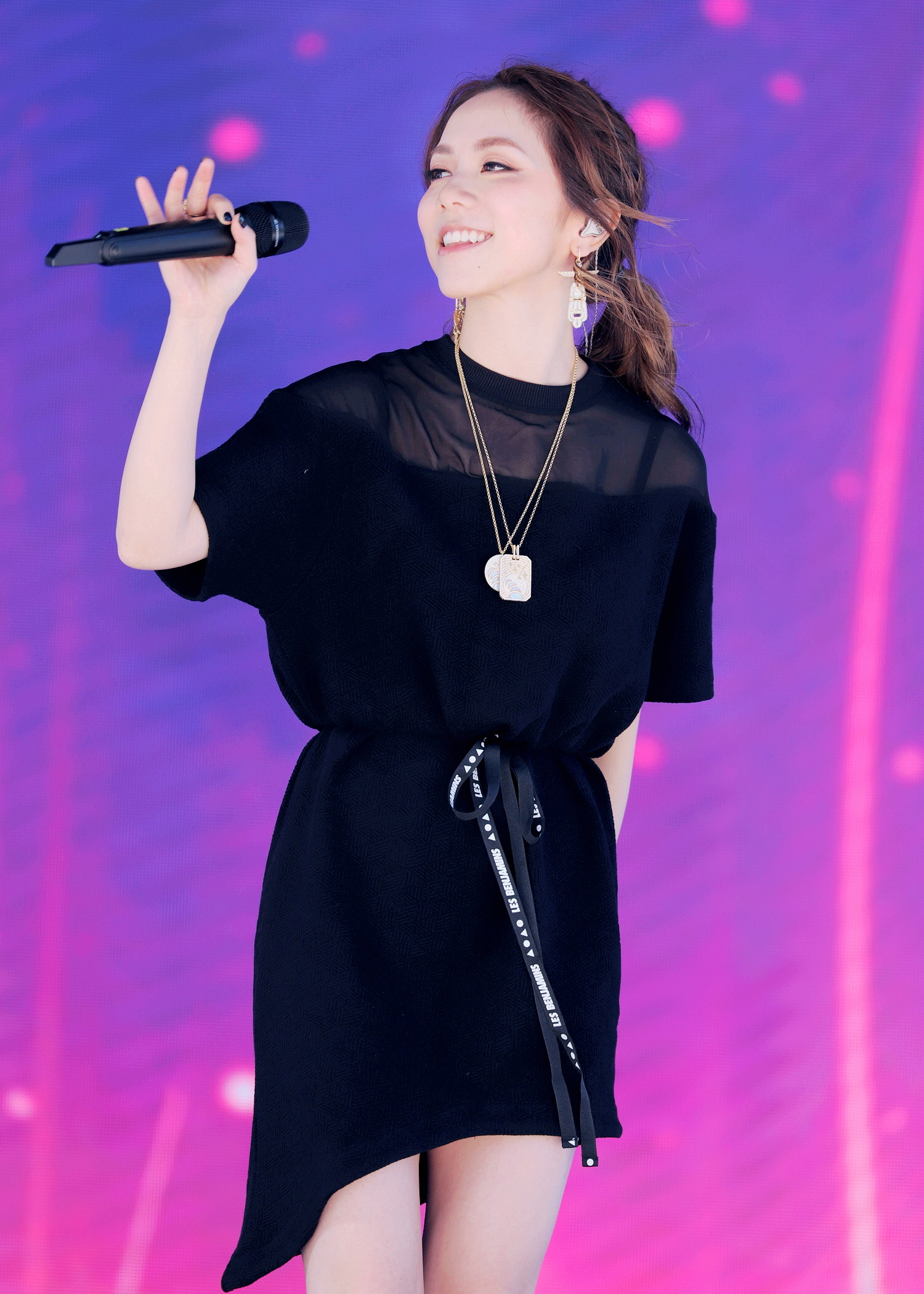
G.E.M. in 2018

Beginning March 2019, she resumed her Queen of Hearts World Tour with concerts across Canada, the United States and Eastern Asia. On 3 May 2019, G.E.M. released her sixth and last studio album with Hummingbird, Happily Ever After, which is a compilation of three EPs she released in late 2018 as part of the Fairytale Trilogy. G.E.M.'s personal studio G Nation Lmt. was founded on 19 April 2019. Later that year on 21 July, she released the single "Miss Similar" after having performed the song on the hip-hop variety show The Rap of China, which reached number one on the Billboard China Top 100. She subsequently released various singles, including "Walk on Water" and "Full Stop", which led up to the release of her seventh studio album City Zoo on 27 December 2019. She then appeared on the Bilibili New Year's Eve event and Jiangsu TV's New Year's Eve event simultaneously on 31 December, where performed her hit singles.

In March 2020, G.E.M. released the music video for the song "Long After", which serves as the theme for the Taiwanese drama Do You Love Me As I Love You (2020). The video for the song "Don't Force It', a collaboration with Taiwanese singer Eric Chou, was subsequently released in June of that year. In February 2021, G.E.M. released new single "Parallel". In November 2021, G.E.M. released new single "Double You".

=== 2022–present: Revelation, I Am Gloria World Tour and re-recordings ===
On 16 July 2022, G.E.M. announced her new album Revelation would be released soon. The 14-track album is to be released by Warner Music China. "Gloria", the first single from the album was released on 9 August 2022, G.E.M. spoke of the inspiration behind Revelation. On 8 December 2022, G.E.M. released her single "Wallfacer" (面壁者). On 10 July 2023, G.E.M. released her first Spanish language album, Revelación, making her the first Mandopop singer to release a full Spanish album.

On 7 November 2023, G.E.M. announced her fourth concert tour I Am Gloria World Tour. It started on 9 December 2023 at Guangdong Olympic Stadium in Guangzhou, China. In February 2024, G.E.M. served as a guest performer at the "Tatler Xfest: Hong Kong Team vs Inter Miami CF" at Hong Kong Stadium. In January 2025, it was reported that the I Am Gloria World Tour had already attracted over 3 million people and grossed HK$2.657 billion (US$341 million) in revenue, making it the highest-grossing tour by a Chinese artist in 2024. In March, it was reported that the tour had grossed $424 million across 86 shows, making it the fourth highest-grossing tour by a female artist of all-time, surpassing Madonna's Sticky & Sweet Tour, and one of the top-twenty highest-grossing tours overall.

On 12 June 2025, G.E.M. posted a lengthy statement on her Instagram detailing her experience signing a contract with Hummingbird Music at the age of 15 when beginning her music career, which later placed her at a disadvantage. She revealed that she had not received royalties from her songs since the 2019 lawsuit against Hummingbird Music. In the same statement, she announced the release of her first re-recorded album, I Am Gloria, featuring tracks from her previous singles and albums excluding Heartbeat and Happily Ever After.

On 19 September 2025, G.E.M. was announced as the chosen artist to perform the anthem of the 2025 League of Legends World Championship, set to be held in China. She performed the song at the tournament finals on 9 November in Chengdu, alongside Chrissy Costanza, Teya, and Anyma, who provided a remix of the song during her performance.

== Other ventures ==
=== Endorsements ===
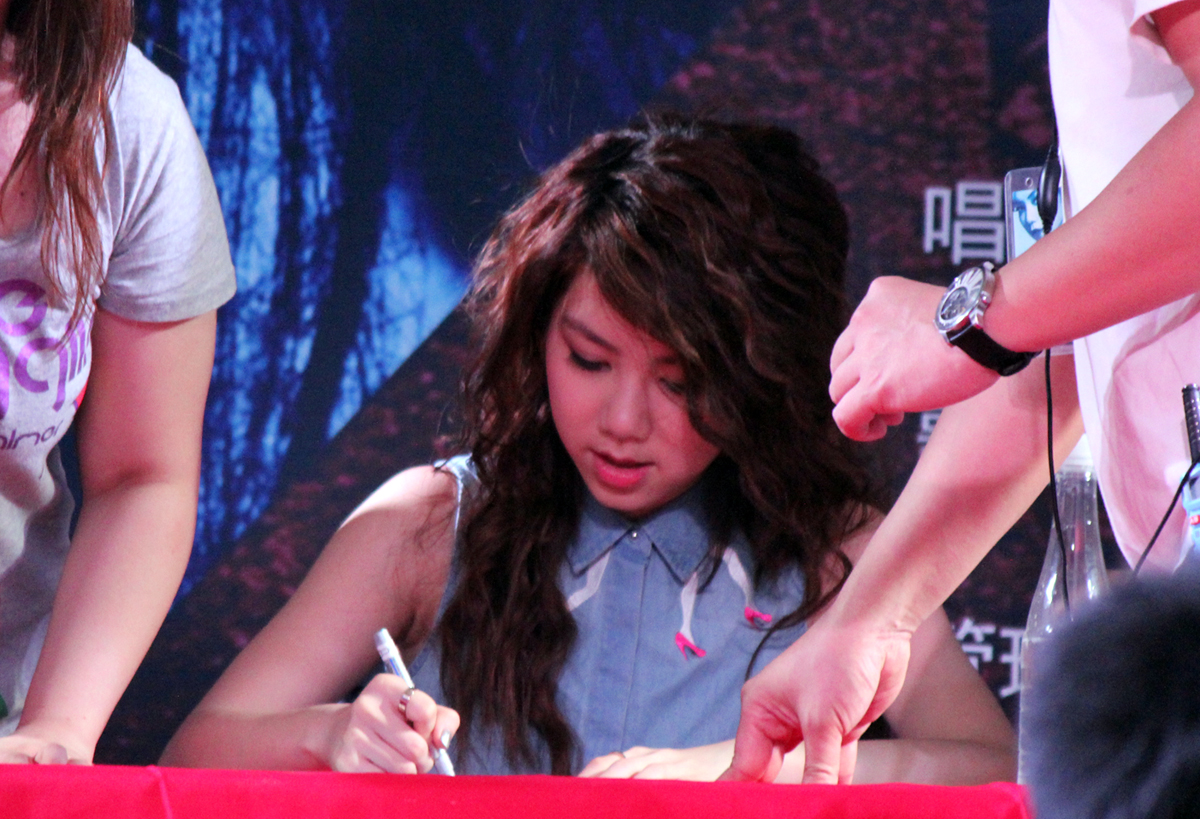
G.E.M. in 2010

G.E.M. has endorsed numerous international and regional brands, products, and organizations throughout her career, including Calvin Klein, CrossFire, Clash of Clans: Royal War, Forza Motorsport, Dove, IDA, King's Glory Education, Maybelline, Panadol, Pepsi, Skechers, TAG Heuer, Topshop, Urban Decay, and XCOR Aerospace.

== Personal life ==
G.E.M. is a devout Christian, and several of her songs reflect Christian themes, including "Gloria", "Heartbeat", and "Walk on Water". Her 2022 album, Revelation, is inspired by a "supernatural experience she encountered". She has stated that her work has been stressful, but that "her faith in God has kept her through the hardships of her career and allowed her to grow in trials".

== Contractual issues and lawsuit ==
On 7 March 2019, she announced that she would no longer be represented by Hummingbird after three months of negotiations on her contract and allegedly being pressured to work. Hummingbird replied saying that there was no such pressure or unfair practices. G.E.M. continued on The Queen of Hearts World Tour until April 2019 so as not to disappoint her fans. As "G.E.M." and "Tang Tsz-kei" are trademarks held by Hummingbird, it was speculated that she may have to give up using the stage name. However Hummingbird explained that the copyright was to prevent piracy, and a lawyer is being consulted before an appropriate course of action is carried out. A spokesperson added that "a lawyer has been assigned to make sure that [she] will receive all the basic rights that she deserves".

On 29 March 2019, Hummingbird filed a court case claiming that G.E.M. has three more years on her contract, ending in 2022, and is looking to validate the contracts signed in 2014, with no start date indicated on the documents, as to be taken in effect only in March 2017. Should their case succeed and she leaves the company, she may have to pay HK$120,000,000 (approximately US$15 million) as compensation for losses. G.E.M. maintained that the 2014 contract was signed under the pressure of not being able to participate in the finals of I Am a Singer if she did not sign the contract. G.E.M. had since filed a counter-suit for unspecified damages, claiming that the company had failed in fulfilling their contractual duties. Both parties seek exclusive rights to her copyrighted works, including the stage name.

On a Shende Wisdom Talents (捨得智慧人物) episode aired on 27 October 2020, G.E.M. alleged that she had suffered "mental abuse" at Hummingbird.

== Discography ==
=== Studio albums ===
- 18... (2009)
- MySecret (2010)
- Xposed (2012)
- Heartbeat (2015)
- Happily Ever After (2019)
- City Zoo (2019)
- Revelation (2022)

=== Re-recorded album ===
- I Am Gloria (2025)

== Filmography ==
=== Feature films ===
Year	Title	Role	Notes	Ref.
2009	Love Connected	Ah Yee	Cameo	
2009	Trick or Cheat	G.E.M.	Leading Actress	
2012	Wreck-It Ralph	Vanellope von Schweetz	Voiceover (Cantonese)	
2017	G.E.M.: G-Force	Herself	Documentary	
2018	Charming	Sleeping Beauty	Voiceover (English)	

=== Music video ===
Year	Title	Artist	Notes	Ref.
2018	"Woke"	G.E.M.	Co-director and co-screenwriter	

=== Short film ===
Year	Title	Role	Medium	Ref.
2018	When My Girl Friend Wants To Watch TV Series	Herself	YouTube	

=== Variety shows ===
Year	Title	Channel	Role	Ref.
2009	Beautiful Cooking 2	TVB	Guest	
2014	I Am a Singer 2	Hunan TV	Contestant	
2014	Miss Dong	Hunan TV	Cameo	
2015	Kangsi Coming	CTi Variety	Guest	
2015	The Amazing Race 2	Shenzhen TV	Contestant	
2016	Heroes of Remix	Jiangsu TV	Guest	
2018	The Rap of China	iQiyi	Mentor	
2018	The Next Top Bang	Dragon TV	Mentor	
2019	The Rap of China Season 2	iQiyi	Mentor	
2020	Me to Us	Mango TV	Guest	
2020	I Want to Live Like This	iQiyi	Guest	
2020	The Coming One: SUPER BAND	Tencent Video	Mentor	
2021	Youth With You 3	iQiyi	X Mentor	
2021	Game of Shark	iQiyi	Guest	
2021	Girls Like Us	Tencent Video	Guest	
2021	The Coming One 5	Tencent Video	Host	
2021	Never Say Never	Youku	Host	
2022	Keep Running	ZRTG	Guest	

== Concert tours ==
=== Headlining tours ===
- Get Everybody Moving Concert (2011–2012)
- X.X.X. Live Tour (2013–2015)
- Queen of Hearts World Tour (2017–2019)
- I Am Gloria World Tour (2023–2026)

=== Concerts ===
- 18 Live Concert (2009)

== See also ==
- List of highest-grossing concert tours by women
