= List of awards and nominations received by G.E.M =

G.E.M awards and nominations
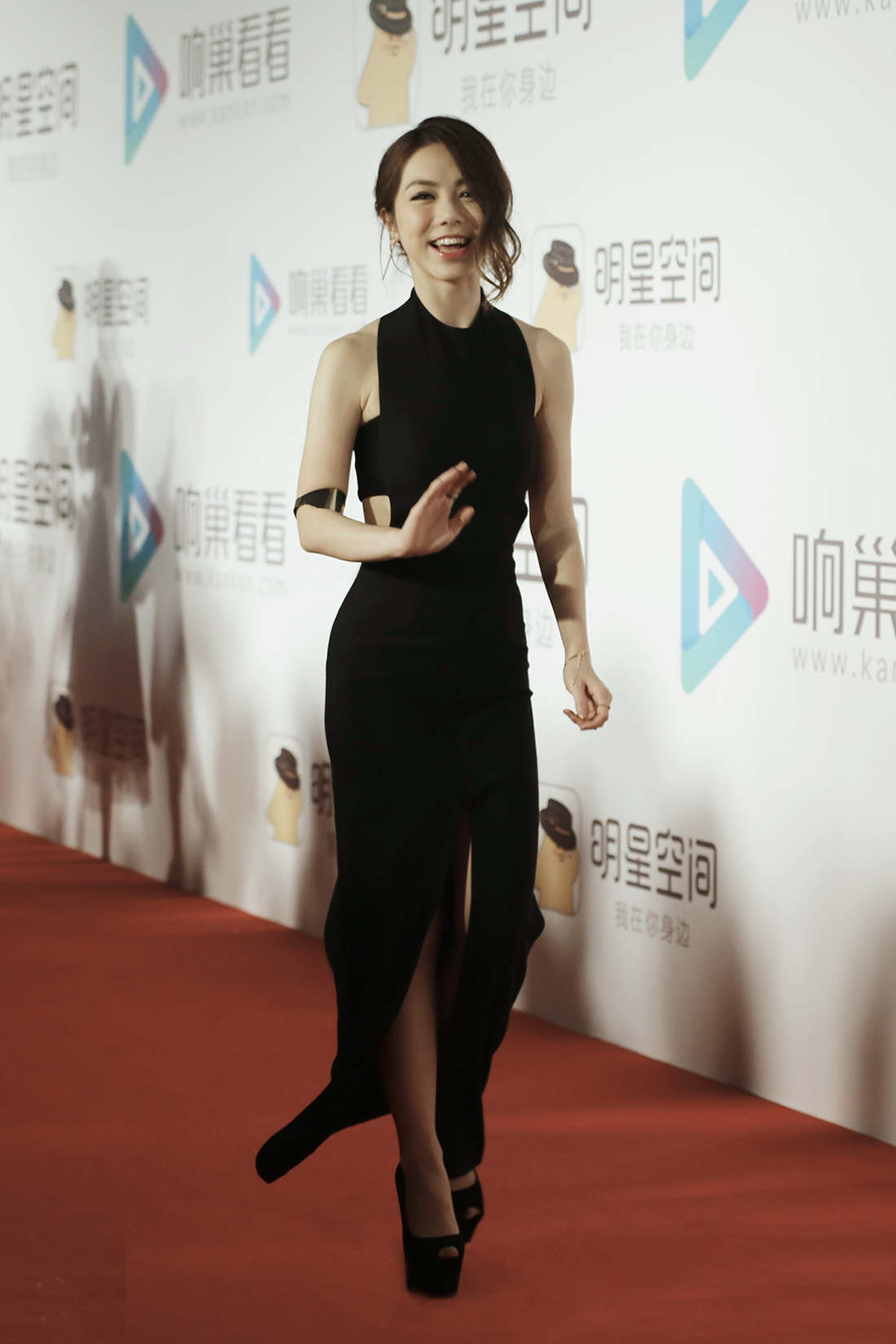
- G.E.M in 2016
Awards and nominations
Award	Wins	Nominations
Canadian Chinese Hit Music Chart	0	2
CASH Golden Sail Music Awards	0	4
Chinese Media Music Awards	0	2
Commercial Radio Hong Kong Ultimate Song Chart Awards	0	3
ERS Top Ten Music Awards	0	1
Global Chinese Golden Chart	0	3
Global Chinese Pop Chart	8	8
Golden Melody Awards	1	2
Guangzhou Chinese Music Awards	1	1
Hito Music Awards	1	1
Hong Kong Performing Artistes Guild Awards	1	1
IFPI Hong Kong Sales Awards	16	16
Jade Solid Gold Songs Awards Ceremony	5	5
KKBOX Music Awards	0	2
Ku Music Awards	2	234
Metro Radio Mandarin Music Awards	13	13
Metro Showbiz Hit Music Awards	16	16
Migu Music Awards	11	11
MTV Europe Music Awards	1	2
Hong Kong Music Video Awards	6	6
Nickelodeon Kids' Choice Awards	1	1
QQ Music Awards	0	0
RTHK Top 10 Gold Songs Awards	12	21
SINA Music Awards	1	1
Sprite Music Awards Ceremony	1	1
Top 10 Songs and Albums Award Ceremony	2	2
V-Chart Music Ceremony	0	4
World Music Awards	0	4
World Outstanding Youth Chinese Awards	1	1
Yahoo! Asia Buzz Awards	1	6
Yes!Hong Kong Idol Choice Awards	0	1

Totals (Note: Certain award groups do not simply award one winner. They acknowledge several different recipients, have runners-up, and have third place. Since this is a specific recognition and is different from losing an award, runner-up mentions are considered wins in this award tally. For simplification and to avoid errors, each award in this list has been presumed to have had a prior nomination.)
- Wins: 145
- Nominations: 166

This is the list of awards and nominations received by Chinese-Hong Kong singer G.E.M. (simplified Chinese: 邓紫棋; traditional Chinese: 鄧紫棋).

== Awards and nominations ==
Name of award ceremony, year presented, award category, nominee of award, and result of nomination
Award ceremony	Year	Category	Nominee(s) / Work(s)	Result	Ref.
Canadian Chinese Hit Music Chart Awards	2008	Best Female Singer–Songwriter	G.E.M.	Won	
Canadian Chinese Hit Music Chart Awards	2009	Top 10 Chinese Songs	"All About U"	Won	
CASH Golden Sail Music Awards	2017	Best Song	"Light Years Away"	Nominated	
CASH Golden Sail Music Awards	2017	Best Melody	"Light Years Away"	Nominated	
CASH Golden Sail Music Awards	2017	Best Lyrics	"Light Years Away"	Nominated	
CASH Golden Sail Music Awards	2017	Best Female Singer	"Light Years Away"	Nominated	
China Music Awards	2017	Artist of the Year	G.E.M.	Won	
China Music Awards	2017	Most Popular Female Artist	G.E.M.	Won	
China Music Awards	2017	Media Recommend Award	G.E.M.	Won	
China Music Awards	2017	Top 10 Songs	"Light Years Away"	Won	
Chinese Media Music Awards	2009	Best Cantonese Female New Artist	G.E.M.	Won	
Chinese Media Music Awards	2014	Artist of the Year	G.E.M.	Won	
Chinese Music Awards	2017	Best Dance/Electronica Performance	25 Looks	Nominated	
ERS Top Ten Music Awards	2016	Best Asian Female Artist	G.E.M.	Won	
ERS Top Ten Music Awards	2016	Best Singer Hong Kong/Taiwan	G.E.M.	Won	
Freshasia Music Award	2019	Most Popular Artist	G.E.M.	Won	
Global Chinese Golden Chart Awards	2016	Top 20 Songs	"Heartbeat"	Won	
Global Chinese Golden Chart Awards	2016	Most Recommended Album	Heartbeat	Won	
Global Chinese Golden Chart Awards	2016	Best Female Singer	G.E.M.	Won	
Global Chinese Pop Chart	2016	Top 20 Songs	"Heartbeat"	Won	
Global Chinese Pop Chart	2016	Top 5 Popular Female Singer	G.E.M.	Won	
Global Chinese Pop Chart	2016	Most Popular Female Singer	G.E.M.	Won	
Global Chinese Pop Chart	2016	Media Recommend Award	G.E.M.	Won	
Global Chinese Pop Chart	2018	Top 5 Popular Female Singer	G.E.M.	Won	
Global Chinese Pop Chart	2018	Most Popular Female Singer	G.E.M.	Won	
Global Chinese Pop Chart	2018	Best Stage Performance	G.E.M.	Won	
Global Chinese Pop Chart	2018	Top 20 Songs	"Light Years Away"	Won	
Guangzhou Chinese Music Awards	2008	Favorite Female New Artist	G.E.M.	Won	
Hong Kong Performing Artistes Guild Awards	2012	Music Excellence Award	G.E.M.	Won	
Golden Melody Awards	2013	Best Mandarin Female Singer	Xposed	Nominated	
Golden Melody Awards	2016	Best Vocal Recording Album	Heartbeat	Nominated	
Golden Melody Awards	2020	Song of the Year	"City Zoo"	Nominated	
Golden Melody Awards	2020	Best Composition	"City Zoo"	Nominated	
Golden Melody Awards	2020	Album of the Year	City Zoo	Nominated	
Golden Melody Awards	2020	Best Mandarin Album	City Zoo	Nominated	
Golden Melody Awards	2020	Best Female Mandarin Singer	City Zoo	Nominated	
Golden Melody Awards	2020	Jury Award	City Zoo	Won	
Hito Music Awards	2016	Best Singer Hong Kong	G.E.M.	Won	
Hito Music Awards	2020	Top 10 Mandarin Songs of the Year	"Selfless"	Won	
Hito Music Awards	2020	Asian Media Award	City Zoo	Won	
IFPI Hong Kong Sales Awards	2008	Best Female New Artist	G.E.M.	Won	
IFPI Hong Kong Sales Awards	2009	Top 10 Best Selling Albums	18...	Won	
IFPI Hong Kong Sales Awards	2009	Top 10 Best Selling Artists	G.E.M.	Won	
IFPI Hong Kong Sales Awards	2011	Top 10 Best Selling Albums	My Secret	Won	
IFPI Hong Kong Sales Awards	2011	Most Downloaded Song	"A.I.N.Y."	Won	
IFPI Hong Kong Sales Awards	2011	Best Live Album	Get Everybody Moving Concert	Won	
IFPI Hong Kong Sales Awards	2012	Top 10 Best Selling Albums	Xposed	Won	
IFPI Hong Kong Sales Awards	2012	Best Selling Mandarin Album of the Year	Xposed	Won	
IFPI Hong Kong Sales Awards	2012	Best Selling Hong Kong Female Artist	G.E.M.	Won	
IFPI Hong Kong Sales Awards	2012	Top 10 Best Selling Hong Kong Singers	G.E.M.	Won	
IFPI Hong Kong Sales Awards	2013	Top 10 Best Selling Hong Kong Singers	G.E.M.	Won	
IFPI Hong Kong Sales Awards	2013	Best Live Album	X.X.X. Live	Won	
IFPI Hong Kong Sales Awards	2015	Top 10 Best Selling Songs	"Intoxicated"	Won	
IFPI Hong Kong Sales Awards	2016	Best Selling Hong Kong Female Singer	G.E.M.	Won	
IFPI Hong Kong Sales Awards	2016	Top 10 Best Selling Albums	Heartbeat	Won	
IFPI Hong Kong Sales Awards	2016	Best Selling Mandarin Album	Heartbeat	Won	
IFPI Hong Kong Sales Awards	2017	Top 10 Best Selling Hong Kong Singers	G.E.M.	Won	
IFPI Hong Kong Sales Awards	2017	Top 10 Best Selling Mandarin Albums	25 Looks	Won	
IFPI Hong Kong Sales Awards	2017	Best Selling Mandarin Album	25 Looks	Won	
Jade Solid Gold Awards	2008	Best Female New Artist	G.E.M.	Gold	
Jade Solid Gold Awards	2009	Excellence Award	G.E.M.	Gold	
Jade Solid Gold Awards	2010	Outstanding Artist	G.E.M.	Won	
Jade Solid Gold Awards	2012	Top 10 Best Songs	"What Have U Done"	Won	
Jade Solid Gold Awards	2012	Most Popular Singer-Songwriter	G.E.M.	Silver	
KKBox Music Awards	2009	Most Popular Hong Kong Singer	G.E.M.	Won	
KKBox Music Awards	2015	Best Cantonese Singer	G.E.M.	Won	
KKBox Music Awards	2017	Top 10 Artists of the Year	G.E.M.	Won	
KKBox Music Awards	2018	Top 10 Artists of the Year	G.E.M.	Won	
Ku Music Awards	2016	Best Singer Hong Kong/Taiwan	Heartbeat	Won	
Metro Radio Mandarin Music Awards	2009	New Artist Award	G.E.M.	Won	
Metro Radio Mandarin Music Awards	2010	Top Songs of the Year	"A.I.N.Y."	Won	
Metro Radio Mandarin Music Awards	2011	Best Artist Award	G.E.M.	Won	
Metro Radio Mandarin Music Awards	2011	Best Performance	G.E.M.	Won	
Metro Radio Mandarin Music Awards	2012	Best Mandarin Song	"Oh Boy"	Won	
Metro Radio Mandarin Music Awards	2012	Best Female Singer	G.E.M.	Won	
Metro Radio Mandarin Music Awards	2012	Singer of the Year	G.E.M.	Won	
Metro Radio Mandarin Music Awards	2013	Best Mandarine Song	"Intoxicated"	Won	
Metro Radio Mandarin Music Awards	2013	Best Female Singer	G.E.M.	Won	
Metro Radio Mandarin Music Awards	2013	Singer of the Year	G.E.M.	Won	
Metro Radio Mandarin Music Awards	2013	Best Performance	G.E.M.	Nominated	
Metro Radio Mandarin Music Awards	2013	Best Composer	G.E.M.	Won	
Metro Radio Mandarin Music Awards	2014	Best Stage Performance	G.E.M.	Won	
Metro Radio Mandarin Music Awards	2015	Most Popular Mandarin Song	"Long Distance"	Won	
Metro Radio Mandarin Music Awards	2015	Song of the Year	"Long Distance"	Won	
Metro Radio Mandarin Music Awards	2015	Artist of the Year	G.E.M.	Won	
Metro Radio Mandarin Music Awards	2015	Best Stage Performance	G.E.M.	Won	
Metro Radio Mandarin Music Awards	2015	Most Popular Artist	G.E.M.	Won	
Metro Showbiz Hit Awards	2008	Best New Artist	G.E.M.	Won	
Metro Showbiz Hit Awards	2009	Best Performance	G.E.M.	Won	
Metro Showbiz Hit Awards	2009	Four Channels Excellence Award	G.E.M.	Silver	
Metro Showbiz Hit Awards	2010	Best Song	"Good to Be Bad"	Won	
Metro Showbiz Hit Awards	2010	Best Singer–Songwriter	G.E.M.	Won	
Metro Showbiz Hit Awards	2010	Best Performance	G.E.M.	Won	
Metro Showbiz Hit Awards	2011	Best Performance	G.E.M.	Won	
Metro Showbiz Hit Awards	2011	Female Singer of the Year	G.E.M.	Won	
Metro Showbiz Hit Awards	2012	Female Singer of the Year	G.E.M.	Won	
Metro Showbiz Hit Awards	2012	Best Album	Xposed	Won	
Metro Showbiz Hit Awards	2012	Song of the Year	"Someday I'll Fly"	Won	
Metro Showbiz Hit Awards	2013	Most Broadcast Singer of the Year	G.E.M.	Won	
Metro Showbiz Hit Awards	2014	Artist of the Year	G.E.M.	Won	
Metro Showbiz Hit Awards	2014	Best Stage Performance	G.E.M.	Won	
Metro Showbiz Hit Awards	2014	Best International Artist	G.E.M.	Won	
Metro Showbiz Hit Awards	2014	Song of the Year	"Like You"	Won	
Metro Showbiz Hit Awards	2018	Metro Mandopop Singer	G.E.M.	Won	
Metro Showbiz Hit Awards	2018	Metro Mandopop Song	"Tik Tok"	Won	
Migu Music Awards	2014	Top 10 Songs	"A.I.N.Y."	Won	
Migu Music Awards	2014	Popular Song of the Year	"Bubble"	Won	
Migu Music Awards	2014	Most Popular Female Singer Hong Kong/Taiwan	G.E.M.	Won	
Migu Music Awards	2015	Popular Entertainer of the Year	G.E.M.	Won	
Migu Music Awards	2016	Most Popular Singer	G.E.M.	Won	
Migu Music Awards	2016	Most Popular Female Singer Hong Kong/Taiwan	G.E.M.	Won	
Migu Music Awards	2016	Best Mandarin Album	Heartbeat	Won	
Migu Music Awards	2016	Top 10 Songs	"Long Distance"	Won	
Migu Music Awards	2017	Most Popular Singer	G.E.M.	Won	
Migu Music Awards	2017	Most Popular Female Singer Hong Kong/Taiwan	G.E.M.	Won	
Migu Music Awards	2017	Top 10 Songs	"Light Years Away"	Won	
Migu Music Awards	2018	Best Female Singer of the Year	G.E.M.	Won	
Migu Music Awards	2018	Most Popular Female Singer	G.E.M.	Won	
Migu Music Awards	2018	Top 10 Songs	"Tik Tok"	Won	
Migu Music Awards	2020	Top Female Artist Hong Kong/Taiwan	G.E.M.	Won	
Migu Music Awards	2020	Most Popular Singer by China Volleyball League Members	G.E.M.	Won	
Migu Music Awards	2020	Best Album of the Year	City Zoo	Won	
Migu Music Awards	2020	Top 10 Songs	"Miss Similar"	Won	
Mnet Asian Music Awards	2020	Best Asian Artist (Mandarin)	G.E.M.	Won	
MTV Europe Music Awards	2014	Best Mainland China & Hong Kong Act	G.E.M.	Nominated	
MTV Europe Music Awards	2016	Best Mainland China & Hong Kong Act	G.E.M.	Won	
MTV Global Mandarin Music Awards	2017	Best Female	G.E.M.	Won	
MTV Global Mandarin Music Awards	2017	Top 10 Songs	"Light Years Away"	Won	
MTV Global Mandarin Music Awards	2017	Top 10 Songs	"Goodbye"	Nominated	
Hong Kong Music Video Awards	2016	Top 10 Music Videos	"Moment"	Won	
Hong Kong Music Video Awards	2016	Best Female Music Video	"Moment"	Won	
Hong Kong Music Video Awards	2016	Most Popular Music Videos	"Moment"	Won	
Hong Kong Music Video Awards	2016	Top Music Videos	"Moment"	Won	
Nickelodeon Kids' Choice Awards	2014	Favorite Asian Act	G.E.M.	Won	
QQ Music Awards	2015	Top Songs	"Bubble"	Won	
QQ Music Awards	2015	Best Original Song for Motion Pictures	"The Continent"	Won	
QQ Music Awards	2015	Best Hong Kong Female Singer	G.E.M.	Won	
QQ Music Awards	2016	Best Female Singer Hong Kong/Taiwan	G.E.M.	Won	
QQ Music Awards	2016	Top Album	Heartbeat	Won	
RTHK Top 10 Gold Songs Awards	2009	Best New Artist	G.E.M.	Silver	
RTHK Top 10 Gold Songs Awards	2010	Outstanding Artist	G.E.M.	Won	
RTHK Top 10 Gold Songs Awards	2010	Most Improved Award	G.E.M.	Gold	
RTHK Top 10 Gold Songs Awards	2011	Top 10 Songs	"Get Over You"	Won	
RTHK Top 10 Gold Songs Awards	2011	Top 10 Singers	G.E.M.	Won	
RTHK Top 10 Gold Songs Awards	2012	Top 10 Singers	G.E.M.	Won	
RTHK Top 10 Gold Songs Awards	2012	Best Mandarin Song	"My Secret"	Silver	
RTHK Top 10 Gold Songs Awards	2013	Top 10 Best Songs	"What Have U Done"	Won	
RTHK Top 10 Gold Songs Awards	2014	Top 10 Singers	G.E.M.	Won	
RTHK Top 10 Gold Songs Awards	2014	Top 10 Best Songs	"Next Second"	Nominated	
RTHK Top 10 Gold Songs Awards	2014	Best Mandarin Song	"Intoxicated"	Gold	
RTHK Top 10 Gold Songs Awards	2015	Best Mandarin Song	"Sometimes"	bronze	
RTHK Top 10 Gold Songs Awards	2016	Best Mandarin Song	"Heartbeat"	Nominated	
RTHK Top 10 Gold Songs Awards	2016	Top 10 Singers	G.E.M.	Nominated	
RTHK Top 10 Gold Songs Awards	2018	Best Mandarin Song	"Crossfire"	Nominated	
RTHK Top 10 Gold Songs Awards	2019	Best Mandarin Song	"Tik Tok"	Silver	
Sprite Music Awards	2014	Best Female Vocalist	G.E.M.	Won	
Sina Music Awards	2012	Top 20 Digital Songs	"Someday I'll Fly"	Won	
Sina Music Awards	2012	Best Web Singer	G.E.M.	Won	
Sina Music Awards	2012	Best Singer-Songwriter	G.E.M.	Won	
Tencent Music Entertainment Awards	2019	Most Influential Artist of the Year (Female) HK/TW	G.E.M.	Won	
Tencent Music Entertainment Awards	2019	Best Artist of the Year (Female) HK/TW	G.E.M.	Won	
Tencent Music Entertainment Awards	2020	Best Artist of the Year (Female) HK/TW	G.E.M.	Won	
Tencent Music Entertainment Awards	2020	Ten Best Songs of the Year	"Full Stop"	Won	
Tencent Music Entertainment Awards	2021	Most Influential Artist of the Year (Female) HK/TW	G.E.M.	Won	
Tencent Music Entertainment Awards	2024	Most Influential Artist of the Year (Female) HK/TW	G.E.M.	Won	
Top 10 Songs and Albums Awards	2016	Top 10 Songs	"Moment"	Won	
Top 10 Songs and Albums Awards	2016	Top 10 Albums	Heartbeat	Won	
Ultimate Song Chart Awards	2008	Best New Artist	G.E.M.	Gold	
Ultimate Song Chart Awards	2009	My Favourite Female Singer	G.E.M.	Nominated	
V Chart Awards	2014	Best Hong Kong Female Artist	G.E.M.	Won	
V Chart Awards	2016	Artist of the Year	G.E.M.	Won	
V Chart Awards	2016	Best Female Artist Hong Kong/Taiwan	G.E.M.	Won	
V Chart Awards	2016	Most Popular Artist Hong Kong/Taiwan	G.E.M.	Won	
World Outstanding Youth Chinese Awards	2016	World Outstanding Chinese Youth	G.E.M.	Won	
Yahoo! Asia Buzz Awards	2008	Top New Artist	G.E.M.	Won	
Yahoo! Asia Buzz Awards	2012	Top 10 Songs	"What Have U Done"	Won	
Yahoo! Asia Buzz Awards	2012	Top Album	Xposed	Won	
Yahoo! Asia Buzz Awards	2013	Top Mandarin Song	"Intoxicated"	Won	
Yahoo! Asia Buzz Awards	2013	Top Music Video	"Sometimes"	Won	
Yahoo! Asia Buzz Awards	2013	Top Concert Tour	X.X.X. Live Tour	Won	
Yes! Hong Kong Idol Choice Awards	2009	Best Female Idol	G.E.M.	Won	

== Other accolades ==
=== Listicles ===
Name of publisher, name of listicle, year listed, and result
Publisher	Listicle	Year	Placement	Ref.
BBC	BBC 100 Women	2018	Placed	
Forbes	Forbes China Celebrity 100	2015	11th	
Forbes	30 Under 30 Music	2016	Placed	
Forbes	30 Under 30 Entertainment & Sports	2016	Placed	
Forbes	Asia's 100 Digital Stars	2020	Placed	
