= List of record charts =

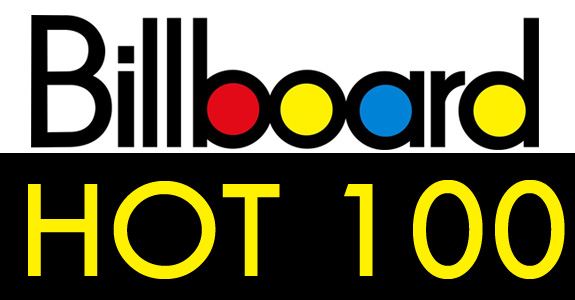
A previous logo for the Billboard Hot 100, main chart for singles in the U.S. (major world's music market)

A record chart, also known as a music chart, is a method of ranking music judging by the popularity during a given period of time. Although primarily a marketing or supermarketing tool like any other sales statistic, they have become a form of popular media culture in their own right.

Record charts are compiled using a variety of criteria. These commonly include sales of records, cassettes and compact discs; amount of radio airplay; requests to radio disk jockeys; voting for songs by the radio listeners and, more recently, number of downloads and streams.

Some charts are specific to a particular musical genre and most to a particular geographical location. The most common period of time covered by a chart is one week, with the chart being printed or broadcast at the end of this time. Summary charts for years and decades are then calculated from their component weekly charts. Component charts have become an increasingly important way to measure the commercial success of individual songs.

Reviewers often describe records using round number milestones within a chart. For example, a record that peaks at number 7 may be called a "Top 10" hit, even when there is no chart limited to only the top 10 records in that particular location.

== Africa ==
Egypt

- IFPI

Nigeria

- TurnTable Top
  - TurnTable Top 100 chart (singles chart)
  - TurnTable Top 100 Album (albums chart)

North Africa

- IFPI

South Africa

- The Official South African Charts

== Asia ==
China

- Billboard China
  - China Top 100
  - China Airplay/FL
- Music Radio China Top Chart Awards

India

- IMI International Top 20 Singles
- India Songs

Indonesia

- IFPI
- Billboard Indonesia
  - Billboard Indonesia Top 100

Israel

- Media Forest
- Mako Hitlist

Japan

- Billboard Japan
  - Billboard Japan Hot 100
  - Billboard Japan Hot Albums
- Oricon
  - Oricon Combined Singles Chart
  - Oricon Combined Albums Chart
  - Oricon Singles Chart
  - Oricon Albums Chart

Malaysia

- IFPI
- RIM Charts

Philippines

- IFPI
  - Official Philippines Chart
- Billboard Philippines
  - Philippine Hot 100
  - Top Philippine Songs
  - Philippine Top 20
  - Catalog Chart

Saudi Arabia

- IFPI

Singapore

- IFPI
- RIAS Top Charts

South Korea

- Circle Chart
  - Circle Digital Chart
  - Circle Album Chart
  - Circle Social Chart
- Melon Chart

Thailand

- IFPI
- Thailand Top 100 by JOOX

United Arab Emirates

- IFPI

Vietnam

- IFPI
- Billboard Vietnam
  - Vietnam Hot 100
  - Top Vietnamese Songs

== Europe ==
Continental Europe

- European Hot 100 Singles
- European Top 100 Albums

Austria

- Ö3 Austria Top 40

Belgium

- Ultratop
  - Ultratop 50 Singles (Flanders)
  - Ultratop 50 Singles (Wallonia)
  - Ultratop 200 Albums

Bulgaria

- PROPHON

Croatia

- Croatian Airplay Radio Chart

Czech Republic

- Rádio – Top 100

Denmark

- Hitlisten

Finland

- The Official Finnish Charts

France

- Syndicat National de l'Édition Phonographique

Germany

- GfK Entertainment Charts

Greece

- Greek IFPI singles and albums charts
- Billboard Greece
  - Greek Airplay Charts

Hungary

- Association of Hungarian Record Companies

Iceland

- Félag hljómplötuframleiðenda
  - Tónlistinn – Lög (single)
  - Tónlistinn – Plötur (album)

Ireland

- Irish Recorded Music Association
  - Irish Singles Chart
  - Irish Downloads Chart
  - Irish Albums Chart
  - Irish Independent Albums Chart

Italy

- Federazione Industria Musicale Italiana

Netherlands

- GfK Netherlands
  - Single Top 100
  - Album Top 100

Norway

- VG-lista

Poland

- Polish Society of the Phonographic Industry
  - Polish music charts
  - OLiS

Portugal

- Top Oficial da AFP

Romania

- Romanian record charts:
  - Romanian Top 100 (1995-2012)

Slovakia

- Rádio – Top 100

Slovenia

- SloTop50

Spain

- Productores de Música de España

Sweden

- Sverigetopplistan
- Tio i Topp (1961-1974)
- Svensktoppen (1962-1982, 1985-present)

Switzerland

- Swiss Hitparade

Turkey

- Billboard Türkiye
  - Türkçe Top 20
  - Türkiye Top 20
  - Turkish Rock Top 20 Chart

Ukraine

- FDR Media
- TopHit

United Kingdom

- Official Charts Company
  - UK Singles Chart
  - UK Singles Downloads Chart
  - Official Audio Streaming Chart
  - Official Vinyl Singles Chart
  - UK Albums Chart
  - UK Album Downloads Chart
  - Official Albums Streaming Chart
  - Official Record Store Chart
  - Official Vinyl Albums Chart
  - UK Compilation Chart
- The Official Big Top 40 from Global

== North America ==
Canada

- Canadian Albums Chart
- Canadian Hot 100
- Canadian Singles Chart
- RPM (1964-2000)
- Steede Report (1975-1979)
- Music Canada (1977-1979)
- The Record (1983-2001)
- CHUM Chart

Mexico

- Mexico Airplay (singles chart)
- Monitor Latino (singles chart)
- Top 100 Mexico (albums chart)

United States

- Billboard
  - Billboard charts
  - Billboard Hot 100 (singles chart)
  - Billboard 200 (albums chart)
- Cash Box (magazine) (1942-1996, 2006-present)
- Mediabase
- Radio & Records
- Rolling Stone charts (2019-2021)
- JazzWeek
- US Albums Chart
- US Singles Chart

== Oceania ==
Australia

- ARIA Charts
  - ARIA Digital Track Chart
  - ARIA Digital Album Chart

New Zealand

- Recorded Music NZ
  - Official New Zealand Music Chart

== South America ==
Argentina

- Billboard Argentina Hot 100
- CAPIF charts

Brazil

- Billboard Brasil Hot 100
- Crowley Charts
- Top Álbuns Brasil

Colombia

- National-Report

Venezuela

- Record Report

== Bibliography ==
The following books list recording artists in alphabetical order unless otherwise stated.

- Australia. Kent, David. Australian Chart Book 1940–1969: the hit songs and records from thirty years of specially compiled charts. Turramurra, N.S.W.: Australian Chart Book, 2005 ISBN 0-646-44439-5
- Australia. Kent, David. Australian Chart Book 1970–1992: 23 years of hit singles & albums from the top 100 charts. Turramurra, N.S.W.: Australian Chart Book, 1993 ISBN 0-646-11917-6
- Australia. Kent, David. Australian Chart Book 1993–2009: the hit singles and albums from 17 years of Australia's national charts. Turramurra, N.S.W.: Australian Chart Book, 2010 ISBN 978-0-646-52995-0
- Australia. Kent, David. The Australian top 20 book (1940-2006): All the top 20 singles charts covering more than 67 years. Turramurra, N.S.W.: Australian Chart Book, 2007 ISBN 978-0-646-47665-0
- Australia. Ryan, Gavin. Australia's Music Charts 1988-2010: Containing ARIA Chart information from their Singles, Albums and Music DVD Charts. Mt Martha, Vic.: Moonlight Publishing, 2011
- Australia. Barnes, Jim and Stephen Scanes. The Book: Top 40 Research 1956-2010. Gorokan, N.S.W.: Scanes Music Research, 2011 ISBN 0-646-25736-6
- Austria. Wittmann, Wolfgang. Österreichisches Hitlexikon. 1956-1983/84. Graz: DBV Verlag, 1984 OCLC 144800830
- Belgium. Collin, Robert. Het Belgisch Hitboek: 45 jaar hits in Vlaanderen: 1954-1999. Lier: Vox, 1999 ISBN 90-76695-01-6
- Belgium. Jaspers, Sam. Ultratop 20.000 hits!: 1995-2005. Deurne (Antwerpen): Book & Media Publishing, 2006 ISBN 90-5720-232-8
- Canada. Lwin, Nanda. The Canadian singles chart book: 1975–1996. Mississauga, Ont.: Music Data Canada, 1996 ISBN 1-896594-09-3
- Canada. Lwin, Nanda. Top 40 hits: the essential chart guide. Mississauga, Ont.: Music Data Canada, 2000 ISBN 1-896594-13-1
- Canada. Lwin, Nanda. Top albums: the essential chart guide. Toronto: Music Data Research, 2003 ISBN 1-896594-14-X
- Canada. Tarling, Brian. RPM's Pop Charted Songs: From June 24, 1964 to February 10, 1990. Burnaby, B.C.: Brian Tarling, 2015 ISBN 978-0-9877593-2-0 854p.
- Canada. Tarling, Brian. RPM's Pop Charted Tracks: Hit Songs From Across Canada: 1990 to 2000. Burnaby, B.C.: Brian Tarling, 2018 432p.
- Denmark. Jensen, Andrew & Jan Poulsen. Hitlisten, alt om 2.015 hits på Tjeklisten. Copenhagen: Gyldendal, 2005 ISBN 87-02-03549-9
- Finland. Pennanen, Timo. Sisältää hitin: levyt ja esittäjät Suomen musiikkilistoilla vuodesta 1972. Helsingissä: Otava, 2006 ISBN 951-1-21053-X
- Finland. Lassila, Juha. Mitä suomi soittaa?: hittilistat 1954-87. Jyväskylä: Jyväskylän yliopisto, Nykykulttuurin tutkimusyksikkö, 1990 ISBN 951-680-321-0
- France. Habib, Elia. Muz hit .tubes: tubes, numéros 1, disques d'or, charts, 1984-2002. Rouillon: Alinéa bis éd., 2002 ISBN 2-9518832-0-X
- France. King, Alex. Hit-parade: 20 ans de tubes. Paris: Editions Pascal, 2005 ISBN 2-35019-009-9
- France. Suiveng, Yannick. Dictionnaire des tubes en France: 1950-2010, 60 ans de hits !. Domptin: Carrefour du net, 2010 ISBN 978-2-35451-060-2
- Germany. Ehnert, Günter. Hit Bilanz: deutsche Chart Singles: 1956-1980. Hamburg: Taurus Press, 1990 ISBN 3-922542-24-7
- Germany. Ehnert, Günter. Hit Bilanz: deutsche Chart Singles: 1981-1990. Hamburg: Taurus Press, 1994 ISBN 3-922542-44-1
- Germany. Ehnert, Günter. Hit Bilanz: deutsche Chart Singles: 1991-2000. Hamburg: Taurus Press, 2002 ISBN 3-922542-74-3
- Germany. Ehnert, Günter. Hit Bilanz: deutsche Chart Singles: 1956-2001 CD-ROM. Hamburg: Taurus Press, 2002 ISBN 3-922542-60-3
- Germany. Ehnert, Günter. Hit Bilanz: Singles 1956-1980 Top 10. Hamburg: Taurus Press, 1990 ISBN 3-922542-41-7 chronological
- Germany. Ehnert, Günter. Hit Bilanz: Singles 1981-2000 Top 10. Hamburg: Taurus Press, 2001 ISBN 3-922542-46-8 chronological
- Germany. Ehnert, Günter. Hit Bilanz: LP 1962-1986. Hamburg: Taurus Press, 1988 ISBN 3-922542-29-8
- Germany. Amtage, Jörg & Matthias Müller. Alle Hits aus Deutschlands Charts 1950-2005. Berlin: ePubli, 2022 ISBN 978-3-7549-7404-9 (2 vols.)
- Germany. 30 Jahre Single-Hitparade die Jahres-Single-Hitparaden vom 20. Dez. 1959 bis 15. Dez. 1988. Starnberg: Keller, 1989 (Supplement: 40 Jahre Single-Hitparade: Ergänzungsband 1989-1998 (2000))
- Ireland. Gogan, Larry. The Larry Gogan book of Irish chart hits. Dublin: Maxwell in association with RTÉ Radio 2, 1987 ISBN 1-870846-00-1
- Ireland. Kelly, Eddie. The complete guide to Ireland's top ten hits 1954-1979. Dublin: Original Writing, 2010 ISBN 978-1-907179-33-4
- Italy. Padovano, Romy. Hit parade: classifiche, dischi, artisti dagli anni '50 ai nostri giorni. Milan: Mondadori, 1997 ISBN 88-04-42563-6
- Italy. Salvatori, Dario. 40 anni di hit parade italiana: [le canzoni, gli interpreti, i record e le curiosità di tutte le classifiche dal 1957 a oggi]. Firenze: Tarab, 1999 ISBN 88-86675-55-0
- Italy. Spinetoli, John Joseph. Artisti In Classifica: I Singoli: 1960-1999. Milano: Musica e dischi, 2000
- Italy. Spinetoli, John Joseph. Artisti In Classifica: I Album: 1970-1996. Milano: Musica e dischi, 1997
- Japan. Single Chart-Book Complete Edition 1968–2010. Tokyo: Oricon, 2012 ISBN 4-87131-088-4
- Japan. Album Chart-Book Complete Edition 1970–2005. Tokyo: Oricon, 2006 ISBN 4-87131-077-9
- Netherlands. Hit dossier: 1939 tot 1998: samengesteld door Johan van Slooten met medewerking van de Stichting Nederlandse top 40. Haarlem: Becht, 1998 ISBN 90-230-0974-6
- Netherlands. Top 40-Hitdossier: 1965-2025. Just Publishers, 2025 ISBN 97890-8975-956-6
- Netherlands. Arens, Bart, Edgar Kruize and Ed Adams. Mega Top 50 presenteert: 50 jaar hitparade: zoals wekelijks uitgezonden bij de publieke omroep tussen 1963 en 2013. Houten: Spectrum, Uitgeverij Unieboek, 2013 ISBN 978-90-00-33100-0
- New Zealand. Freeman, Warwick. New Zealand Top 20 Singles of the Sixties. Warkworth: Warwick Raymond Freeman, 2016 ISBN 9780473374426 205p.
- New Zealand. Scapolo, Dean. The complete New Zealand music charts, 1966–2006: singles, albums, DVDs, compilations. Wellington: Maurienne House, 2007 ISBN 978-1-877443-00-8
- Norway. Gilde, Torre. Den store norske hitboka: en komplett guide til populaermuikken i norge 1958-1993. Oslo: Exlex, 1994 ISBN 82-7776-000-0
- South Africa. Kimberley, C. South Africa Chart Book. Harare: C. Kimberley, 1997
- Spain. Salaverri, Fernando. Sólo éxitos: 1959-2012. Madrid: Fundación SGAE, 2015 ISBN 978-84-8048-866-2
- Sweden. Hallberg, Eric. Eric Hallberg presenterar Kvällstoppen i P3: Sveriges radios topplista över veckans 20 mest sålda skivor 10/7 1962-19/8 1975. Värmdö: Drift musik, 1993 ISBN 91-630-2140-4
- Sweden. Hallberg, Eric and Ulf Henningsson. Eric Hallberg, Ulf Henningsson presenterar Tio i topp med de utslagna på försök 1961-74. Stockholm: Premium, 2012 ISBN 978-91-89136-89-2
- Sweden. Wendt, Wille. Topplistan: the official Swedish single & album charts 1975–1993. Stockholm: Premium, 1993 ISBN 91-971894-2-1
- Switzerland. Hufschmid, Gusty. 33 Jahre Schweizer Hitparade — Single Charts. Starnberg: J. Keller, 2001 ISBN 3-7808-0182-5
- United Kingdom. The Virgin book of British hit singles. Volume 2. London: Virgin Books, 2010 ISBN 978-0-7535-2245-5
- United Kingdom. The Virgin book of Top 40 charts. London: Virgin Books, 2010 ISBN 978-0-7535-2200-4 chronological
- United Kingdom. The Virgin book of British hit albums. London: Virgin Books, 2009 ISBN 978-0-7535-1700-0
- United Kingdom. Warwick, Neil et al. The complete book of the British charts: singles & albums. London: Omnibus Press, 2004 ISBN 1-84449-058-0

Note: The four books above have been superseded by the Betts/OCC set of books, thus:

- United Kingdom. Betts, Graham. The Official Charts & Hits - The Fifties. London: Official UK Charts Company, 2020 ISBN 978-1-7905-5812-4
- United Kingdom. Betts, Graham. The Official xx Hits Book (60s; 70s; 80s; 90s; 00s; 10s). London: Official UK Charts Company, 2019-20 six volumes
- United Kingdom. Betts, Graham. The Official Singles Charts: 70s; 80s; 90s; 00s; 10s. London: Official UK Charts Company, 2019-20 five chronological volumes
- United Kingdom. Betts, Graham. The Official Albums Charts: 70s; 80s; 90s; 00s; 10s. London: Official UK Charts Company, 2019-20 five chronological volumes
- United Kingdom. Betts, Graham. The Official Compilations Charts: 90s; 00s; 10s. London: Official UK Charts Company, 2019-20 three chronological volumes
- United Kingdom. Rees, Dafydd et al. 40 years of NME charts. London: Boxtree, 1995 ISBN 0-7522-0829-2 chronological
- United Kingdom. Rees, Dafydd et al. 30 years of NME album charts. London: Boxtree, 1995 ISBN 0-7522-0824-1 chronological
- United Kingdom. White George R. British Hit EPs 1955-1989. York: Music Mentor, 2014 ISBN 978-0-9562679-6-2
- United States. Joel Whitburn's Billboard pop hits, singles & albums, 1940–1954. Menomonee Falls, Wisc.: Record Research, 2002 ISBN 0-89820-152-7
- United States. Joel Whitburn’s Top Pop Singles 1955–2018. Menomonee Falls, Wisc.: Record Research, 2019
- United States. Joel Whitburn's Top Pop Albums 1955-2016. Menomonee Falls, Wisc.: Record Research, 2018
- United States. Whitburn, Joel. Billboard Hot 100 Charts. Menomonee Falls, Wisc.: Record Research, various dates (comprises 1950s; The Sixties; The Seventies; The Eighties; The Nineties; The 2000s) chronological
- United States. Joel Whitburn presents Billboard Pop Album Charts 1965-1969. Menomonee Falls, Wisc.: Record Research, 1993 ISBN 0-89820-097-0 chronological
- Zimbabwe. Kimberley, C. Zimbabwe: singles chart book. Harare: C. Kimberley, 2000
- Zimbabwe. Kimberley, C. Albums chart book: Zimbabwe. Harare: C. Kimberley, 1998
