= Happily Ever After (G.E.M. album) =

Studio album by G.E.M.
- Released: May 3, 2019
- Recorded: 2018
- Genre: Pop
- Length: 34:46
- Language: Mandarin; Cantonese
- Label: Hummingbird; PCEP Company, Ltd.; Sony Music Taiwan
- Producer: Lupo Groinig

G.E.M. chronology
Heartbeat (2015)	Happily Ever After (2019)	City Zoo (2019)

Singles from Happily Ever After
- 1. "Tik Tok" Released: August 10, 2018; 2. "Woke" Released: November 9, 2018; 3. "Love Finds a Way" Released: December 7, 2018

Happily Ever After (Chinese: 童話的休止符; pinyin: Tónghuà de xiūzhǐfú) is the fifth studio album by Hong Kong singer-songwriter G.E.M. The album was preceded by three extended plays (EP) each containing three songs: My Fairytale, Fearless, and Queen G, which were released between August and December 2018. The full album Happily Ever After was later released as a CD and exclusively on YouTube Music on May 3, 2019, amidst legal disputes between G.E.M. and her label, Hummingbird Music.

The title of the separate extended plays are taken from one of the B-side songs in each of the respective releases. The music video for the single "Tik Tok" reached 119 million views as of July 2022.

== Background ==
Following the success, and to support her first full Mandarin and fourth studio album Heartbeat, G.E.M. kicked off her third solo tour, "Queen of Hearts", on April 1, 2017, in Guangzhou, China. During the sold-out three-day concert schedule in Taiwan held on March, it was revealed by her agency that the singer will release a new album that summer. On July 8, in celebration of her 10th anniversary, G.E.M. held a fan meeting in Guangzhou and confirmed additional details about the project, announcing that she will release a total of three EPs in a row, releasing one every two months starting August and that she will also release music videos.

== Release ==
On August 10, 2018, G.E.M. released the music video for her single "Tik Tok" which was shot in Inner Mongolia, featuring Taiwanese actor Tender Huang. She performed the song on iQIYI's "Idol Hits" and shared the creative process that it only took three minutes for the song to be completed, claiming it to be "fate". The first out of three EPs from the project, My Fairytale, was released digitally on Chinese streaming platforms on August 16 and officially released worldwide on the 30th, with its lead single "Tik Tok" reaching 9 million views at that time. The cover for the EP was illustrated by Giselle Ukardi, an Instagram creator from Canada portraying G.E.M. as a realistic fairytale. According to G.E.M., the EP depicts her own fairytale that she found in real world.

On October 12, 2018, G.E.M. released the teaser for the second single "Woke", and announced on the 20th that the music video will be postponed and reshot. She followed with the second EP, Fearless, which was released digitally on Chinese streaming platforms on October 26. The EP, along with the music video, was officially released worldwide on November 9. The music video marked G.E.M.'s directorial debut, where she portrayed two characters, the white one depicts her crazy self, and the black one depicts love and self-discipline.

On December 5, 2018, G.E.M. released the teaser for the third single "Love Finds a Way", and released the official music video on the 7th which was shot in Taiwan, featuring Taiwanese actor Edison Song. According to G.E.M., the song employed flowers as a metaphor to a feeling that is not appreciated by people from the outside. She drew from her personal experiences of being a public figure that is often talked about by people, and realizing that the people around her are more important than those who are critical of her. The third and final EP, Queen G was released on Chinese streaming platforms on December 14. The EP was released worldwide on December 28, along with the fan made video of her song "Queen G" which was uploaded on her official YouTube. The music video featured clips of her debut, live performances, and other behind-the-scenes to celebrate her 10th anniversary. It is the only song in the EP sung in Cantonese.

== Legal disputes with Hummingbird Music ==
On March 7, 2019, G.E.M. announced on her social media that she will be terminating her contract with Hummingbird Music. According to G.E.M., the company continued to violate her contractual rights even after multiple chances. Despite the contract termination, she made the decision to continue with the remaining eight stops for her ongoing concert, "Queen of Hearts", which she wrapped up in Kaohsiung on April 28.

On March 28, Hummingbird officially filed a lawsuit against G.E.M. regarding her contract. In the documents submitted, it was stated that G.E.M. initially signed a five-year contract in 2007 and renewing it in March 2012 for another five years. Three years before the end of the contract, Hummingbird claimed that the singer signed another renewal contract which was not dated but it was agreed upon that it will take effect in March 2017, making the contract's effective end date to be in March 2022. In the court documents, the company was also looking at claiming ownership of the singer's copyrighted works, along with her stage name.

On April 5, G.E.M. filed a counter lawsuit, asking the court to not allow Hummingbird to take ownership of her work and trademark, along with an unspecified compensation amount. On May 3, Happily Ever After was released in Hong Kong under PCEP Company, Ltd., and on May 10 in Taiwan under Sony Music. Happily Ever After marked G.E.M.'s last studio album to be released under Hummingbird.

== Track listing ==
All songs are written by G.E.M. and produced by G.E.M. and Lupo Groinig.

Happily Ever After track listing
No.	Title	Length
1.	"Tik Tok" (倒數; Dàoshǔ)	3:49
2.	"Rightfully Wrong" (錯過不錯; Cuòguò bu cuò)	3:58
3.	"My Fairytale" (另一個童話; Lìng yīgè tónghuà)	3:03
4.	"Woke" (那一夜; Nà yīyè)	3:54
5.	"Fearless" (毒蘋果; Dú píngguǒ)	4:11
6.	"Unexpectedly" (突然之間; Túrán zhī jiān)	3:20
7.	"Love Finds a Way" (岩石裏的花; Yánshí lǐ de huā)	4:54
8.	"Why"	3:41
9.	"Queen G" (睡皇后; Seoi6 wong4hau6)	3:56
Total length:		34:46

== Credits and personnel ==
Credits from the album's liner notes.

Musicians

- G.E.M. – vocals, background vocals (all tracks)
- Gigi Worth – background vocals (track 8)
- Sam Vahdat – keys/synths & programming (tracks 1, 2, 3, 4, 5, 9)
- Lupo Groinig – keys/synths & programming (tracks 1, 2, 3, 4, 5, 9), guitar (tracks 2, 3, 5, 6)
- Doug Petty – keys & programming (track 9), piano & B3 (tracks 6, 8), piano & Moog (track 7), string arrangement (track 6, 7, 8)
- Aaron Sterling – drums (tracks 6, 7, 8)
- Derek Frank– bass (tracks 6, 8)
- Dan Petty – guitars (track 6)

Technical

- Tan Chang – executive producer, A&R, art direction
- Lupo Groinig – executive producer, A&R
- Giselle Ukardi – graphic designer
- Kei Meguro – graphic designer
- Ilya Kuvshinov – graphic designer
- Damon Tedesco – engineering (tracks 6, 7, 8)
- Richard Furch – mixing
- Reuben Cohen – mastering

== Charts ==
Chart performance for Happily Ever After
Chart (2019)	Peak position
Hong Kong Albums (HKRMA)	1

== Release history ==
Release dates and formats for Happily Ever After
Region	Date	Format(s)	Edition(s)	Label
Hong Kong	May 3, 2019	CD	Standard; pre-order limited	PCEP Company Limited
Taiwan	May 10, 2019	CD	Standard; pre-order limited	Sony Music Taiwan
