= Miss Similar =

Single by G.E.M.

from the album City Zoo
- Language: Mandarin
- Released: July 21, 2019
- Recorded: 2019
- Genre: Pop rap; hip-hop; dance
- Length: 3:50
- Label: G Nation; Sony
- Songwriter(s): G.E.M.
- Producer(s): G.E.M.

G.E.M. singles chronology
"Love Finds A Way" (2018)	"Miss Similar" (2019)	"Walk on Water" (2019)

Music video
- "Miss Similar" on YouTube

"Miss Similar" (Chinese: 差不多姑娘; pinyin: Chàbùduō gūniáng) is a song by Hong Kong singer-songwriter G.E.M., released for digital download and streaming through G Nation on July 21, 2019. It was written and produced by G.E.M., and was included in her sixth studio album, City Zoo (2019).

Musically, "Miss Similar" is a hip-hop and pop rap song with lyrics containing themes of materialism and self-worth. Commercially, it reached number one on the Billboard China Top 100 chart and number two on the Billboard Radio China Top 10 Chart. It won Song of the Year at the Global Chinese Golden Chart Awards.

== Background and release ==
In July 2019, G.E.M. appeared on the third season of the variety show The Rap of China and adapted the song "Mr. Almost" by rapper MC HotDog to fulfill a task assigned by the program team. She performed the adapted version on the show and later released a studio version of "Miss Similar" as a digital single.

== Composition and lyrics ==
The song's lyrics address societal issues and contains themes of female empowerment. They depict women who become consumed by material desires and lose their sense of self. G.E.M. sought to encourage girls to remain authentic, to avoid stressing their worth in the pursuit of being "almost perfect", and to embrace individuality.

== Music video ==
The music video for "Miss Similar" was directed by Bill Chia and portrays the journey of a girl who becomes trapped by a materialistic world and loses her sense of self. Under surreal, flashing lights, the character played by G.E.M. is held captive by a group of blue-haired women dressed in black. She is forced to apply makeup, change outfits, and surrender her will. She ultimately breaks free from the crowd's constraints and bursts the bubble. In the video, G.E.M sports dreadlocks along with a fluorescent green sportswear, which stands out against the dim lighting.

== Accolades ==
Awards and nominations for "Miss Similar"
Organization	Year	Award	Result	Ref.
Asia New Songs Chart	2019	Media Recommended Song of the Year	Won	
Global Chinese Golden Chart Awards	2020	Song of the Year	Won	

== Track listing ==
- Digital download / streaming
1. "Miss Similar" – 3:50

== Charts ==
=== Weekly charts ===
Chart (2019)	Peak position
China (China Top 100)	1
China (TME UNI Chart)	9
China Airplay (Billboard Radio China)	2

== Release history ==
Release dates and formats
Region	Date	Format	Label
Various	July 21, 2019	Digital download; streaming	Hummingbird Music
