= Have a Good Time =

Have a Good Time may refer to:

- Have a Good Time, an album by Al Green
- Have a Good Time, an album by Ruth Brown
- Have a Good Time, an album by MC Cheung
- "Have a Good Time," a song by Paul Simon from the album Still Crazy After All These Years
- "Have a Good Time," a song by Morning Runner from the album Wilderness Is Paradise Now
- “Have a Good Time”, a song by Sue Thompson
- “Have a Good Time”, a song by The Brand New Heavies from the album Brother Sister
