= Light Years Away (G.E.M. song) =

- Single cover

Single by G.E.M.
- Language: Mandarin
- Released: 30 December 2016
- Recorded: 2016
- Genre: Pop
- Length: 3:55
- Label: Hummingbird Music
- Songwriter: G.E.M.
- Producer: Lupo Groinig

G.E.M. singles chronology
"Goodbye (Club Remix)" (2016)	"Light Years Away" (2016)	"Crossfire" (2017)

Music video
- "Light Years Away" on YouTube

"Light Years Away" (Chinese: 光年之外; pinyin: Guāngnián zhī wài) is a song recorded by Hong Kong singer-songwriter G.E.M., released for digital download and streaming under Hummingbird Music on 30 December 2016. Its lyrics were written by G.E.M. whilst production was handled by her long time collaborator Lupo Groining. "Light Years Away" serves as the Chinese theme song for the American sci-fi film Passengers (2016).

G.E.M. composed the song after watching Passengers multiple times and developed several versions of the piece, which eventually became "Light Years Away." Musically, it is a mid-tempo pop song that incorporates piano and drum instrumentations, while its lyrics contain themes of longing and romance. It received positive reviews from music critics, who praised G.E.M.'s vocal performance and the song's production. It reached number one on the Billboard Radio China Top 10 chart and was ranked number four on its year-end ranking in 2017.

An accompanying music video for "Light Years Away" intersperses scenes from Passengers with shots of G.E.M. performing aboard the Avalon. The video became the first by a Hong Kong artist to reach 100 million views on YouTube, and has since become the most-viewed music video by a Chinese artist on the platform, garnering over 280 million views. The song won several accolades at award ceremonies in Greater China, including Top 10 Songs at the China Music Awards, Migu Music Awards, and MTV Global Mandarin Music Awards.

== Background and development ==
She was invited to write the song because of her influence in China and her songwriting skill. After she watched few scenes of the film, she was touched by the love between the two characters. She then wrote different demos and chose this as the final work.

== Music video ==
The music video captures scenes from the film Passengers, and G.E.M. is singing in the Avalon. The music video starts with G.E.M. standing alone in the Avalon, then intersperses the scenes of Jennifer Lawrence and Chris Pratt taken from the film, such as dancing together, playing games, watching films, etc. At the end, it shows the sleeper ship out of control and uses special effects to imitate giant spherical water flow caused by weightlessness.

The video is the first by a Hong Kong artist to reach 100 million views on YouTube. It is also the twelfth Chinese music video to reach 100 million views and the fastest music video by a Chinese female singer to reach 100 million views on YouTube. On 17 March 2019, it has become the most viewed Chinese music video among female singers on YouTube, with a view count of over 177 million. As of July 2025, the music video has garnered over 295 million views on the platform.

== Live performances ==
G.E.M. performed "Light Years Away" at various events following its release. She premiered the song at the HunanTV New Year Concert for 2016-2017. Following this, she made an appearance at the Tencent Myapp Internet Festival on 13 January 2017. Later that year, on 18 June, she attended the Weibo Film Gala. On 16 December 2017, she appeared and performed the song at the 2017 Migu Music Awards.

G.E.M. attended and performed the song at the KKBox Music Awards on 21 January 2018. On 13 April, she performed it alongside Hua Chenyu during Singer 2018. On 4 November 2018, G.E.M. performed "Light Years Away" live at the Seventh Annual Breakthrough Prize at the NASA Ames Research Center in Silicon Valley, California.

== Accolades ==
Awards and nominations for "Light Years Away"
Organization	Year	Award	Result	Ref.
CASH Golden Sail Music Awards	2017	Cash Best Song Award	Nominated	
CASH Golden Sail Music Awards	2017	Best Melody Award	Nominated	
CASH Golden Sail Music Awards	2017	Best Lyrics Award	Nominated	
CASH Golden Sail Music Awards	2017	Best Female Vocalist Performance	Nominated	
China Music Awards	2017	Top Ten Chinese Songs Award	Won	
Global Chinese Pop Chart	2018	Top 20 Songs	Won	
Migu Music Awards	2017	Top Ten Golden Songs Award	Won	
MTV Global Mandarin Music Awards	2017	Top Ten Songs Award	Won	

== Track listing ==
- Digital download / streaming
1. "Light Years Away" – 3:55

== Charts ==
=== Weekly charts ===
Chart (2017–2019)	Peak position
China (China Top 100)	39
China Airplay (Billboard Radio China)	1
Singapore Regional (RIAS)	25

=== Year-end charts ===
Chart (2017)	Position
China Airplay (Billboard Radio China)	4

== Release history ==
Release dates and formats
Region	Date	Format	Label
Various	30 December 2016	Digital download; streaming	Hummingbird Music
