= Revelation (G.E.M. album) =

Studio album by G.E.M.
- Released: September 23, 2022
- Recorded: 2022
- Genre: Mandopop; Christian pop
- Length: 54:56
- Language: Mandarin
- Label: G Nation; Warner Music
- Producer: G.E.M.; Terrence Ma; Lao Dao

G.E.M. chronology
City Zoo (2019)	Revelation (2022)

Alternative cover
- Revelación cover

Revelation (Chinese: 啓示錄; pinyin: Qǐshì lù) is the seventh studio album by Hong Kong singer-songwriter G.E.M., released on September 23, 2022, by G Nation and Warner Music. G.E.M. collaborated with producer Terrence Ma to write and produce the album, which centers on pop and electronica influences drawn from Christian music. She felt that the album's tracks reflect her personal struggles and emotional challenges, and conveys the revelation she experienced through her faith.

The album received acclaim from music critics, who praised its production as well as G.E.M.'s vocal performance and songwriting. It won various awards at regional award ceremonies, including four Chinese Music Awards. Music videos for each of the album's fourteen tracks were produced which were designed to form a cohesive short film. A Spanish version of the record, titled Revelación, was released on July 10, 2023.

G.E.M. embarked on the I Am Gloria World Tour in December 2023 in support of Revelation, travelling across Asia, Europe, and North America. The tour grossed over $340 million in revenue within one year alone, making it amongst the highest-grossing concert tours by a female artist worldwide.

== Background and release ==
During the development behind the album, G.E.M. wrote down the many questions she had about life. She commented, "It was like a direct dialogue between me and heaven. I write letters to heaven, and they write back. This is what gradually gave shape to the concept behind Revelation." She added, "during the songwriting process, I seemed to have discovered wounds buried in my subconscious ... I got to know more about myself and what love truly is".

For a month, G.E.M. contemplated whether to name the album Revelation, questioning, "Should I really choose a title inspired by the Book of Revelation?" In the end, she decided to go head with the name as she felt that it represented a project that conveyed her authentic emotions.

=== Spanish version ===
A Spanish version of the album, titled Revelación, was released on July 10, 2023. G.E.M. commented, "It has been an incredible journey working on this project as I do not speak Spanish, but I was determined to fulfill a prophecy that was made to me 10 years ago that one day I would sing in the language".

== Writing and lyrics ==
...the inspiration for the entire Revelation album came from a supernatural experience she encountered. One day, overwhelmed by sadness, she was crying and praying in the bathroom. When she began humming a melody unconsciously in the shower, she began to feel it bringing her peace, transcending her circumstances. The inspiration for an album emerged: She wanted to use her new song to speak of her struggles, heartbreaks, and prayers, and to remember how God answered prayers to redeem and bless her.

—Christianity Today

G.E.M. commented that the process of writing Revelation delved into some of the most vulnerable parts of her soul. The album's lead single, "Gloria", was created from a moment of realization she experienced in the shower. She described hearing the word "Gloria" as if it were a voice from above. "It felt like God was singing directly to me from the heavens, calling me,". She explained that her world initially felt overwhelmed by a storm, but in an instant, everything became calm and peaceful. This melody ultimately became the chorus of "Gloria".

== Promotion and singles ==
The fourteen tracks on the album were released over a seven-week period beginning in August 2022. Each song has an accompanied music video, with all the videos intended to create a unified narrative that ties them together.

=== Music videos ===
G.E.M. invested NT$101 million (HK$25.94 million) in producing the short film for the album and dedicated two months to writing the script. The Revelation video series portrays the life of an avatar who once thrived in a utopian society before being deactivated. It follows a paralyzed woman who navigates a virtual world through her avatar, where she encounters a character controlled by her real-life neighbor. However, as their online romance advances, she decides to delete her account, leaving her avatar abandoned into a deserted wasteland.

== Critical reception ==
The album received acclaim from music critics. A reviewer from Douban wrote how G.E.M. mastered the balance between mainstream appeal and the artist's deeper message and values that can create a special connection with listeners. The editor added, "it is undoubtedly a benchmark for concept albums today [...] with its arrangement, composition, and vocal performance surpassing all expectations". A reviewer from Hit FM lauded G.E.M's vocal performance in the tracks, as well as the album's auditory and visual cohesiveness. Some critics, however, noted that the focus on love over broader social issues rendered the album somewhat limited in ideological depth. Others argued that despite its concentration on love, the album adopts a broader perspective of "human love and destiny in this era."

== Live performances ==
G.E.M. embarked on her fourth world tour, titled the I Am Gloria World Tour, at the Guangdong Olympic Stadium in Guangzhou on December 7, 2023, playing to 90,000 people over three days. Over the course of the following year, G.E.M. attracted 3,000,000 people from 75 shows across mainland China, setting a record for the most attended tour in both 2024 and by a Chinese female artist of all time. The tour generated approximately $341 million in revenue, making it the highest-grossing concert tour by an Asian female recording artist worldwide.

== Accolades ==
Awards and nominations for Revelation
Organization	Year	Category	Result	Ref.
Asian Pop Music Awards	2022	Best Female Vocalist Award	Won	
Asian Pop Music Awards	2022	Album of the Year	Won	
Asian Pop Music Awards	2022	Top 20 Album of the Year	Won	
Asian Pop Music Awards	2022	Best Producer Award	Nominated	
Chinese Music Awards	2024	Best Mandarin Female Singer of the Year Award	Won	
Chinese Music Awards	2024	Top Ten Chinese Albums Award	Won	
Chinese Music Awards	2024	Best Mandarin Album of the Year Award	Won	
Chinese Music Awards	2024	Jury Prize	Won	
Chinese Music Awards	2024	Best Singer-Songwriter	Nominated	
Chinese Music Awards	2024	Producer of the Year	Nominated	
Chinese Music Awards	2024	Best Album Project of the Year	Nominated	
Chinese Top Ten Music Awards	2023	Best Album Award (Hong Kong and Taiwan)	Won	
Golden Melody Awards	2023	Producer of the Year, Album	Nominated	

== Track listing ==
All tracks are written by G.E.M..

Revelation – CD 1
No.	Title	Length
1.	"Young Man & Sea" (少年與海)	3:43
2.	"Hell"	4:08
3.	"Me & You" (只有我和你的地方)	3:17
4.	"Man Who Laughs" (你不是第一個離開的人)	3:20
5.	"Solitude" (不想回家)	4:06
6.	"Ice Age" (冰河時代)	3:30
7.	"Passion" (受難曲)	2:59
Total length:		25:03

Revelation – CD 2
No.	Title	Length
8.	"Gloria"	4:04
9.	"Old Man & Sea" (老人與海)	3:12
10.	"Find You"	4:16
11.	"F=mw²r" (離心力)	5:01
12.	"One Minute" (讓世界暫停一分鐘)	3:52
13.	"The End of Night" (夜的盡頭)	4:41
14.	"The Sky" (天空沒有極限)	4:39
Total length:		30:45

== Charts ==
Chart (2022)	Peak position
Hong Kong Albums (HKRMA)	1

== Release history ==
Release dates and formats for Revelation
Region	Date	Format	Edition	Label
Various	September 23, 2022	CD; digital download; streaming	Standard edition	G Nation; Warner Music
Various	November 25, 2022	2CD	2CD Celebration edition	G Nation; Warner Music
Various	December 28, 2022	Digital download; streaming	Full Journey edition	G Nation; Warner Music
Various	March 15, 2023	LP	LP edition	G Nation; Warner Music
Various	July 10, 2023	CD; digital download; streaming	Revelación	G Nation; Warner Music
