= Xposed =

Studio album by G.E.M.
- Released: June 27, 2012
- Recorded: 2011–2012
- Genre: Pop; R&B; pop rock
- Length: 39:33
- Language: Mandarin; Cantonese; English
- Label: Hummingbird Music; Forward Music; Sony Music; Columbia Records; Epic Records
- Producer: Lupo Groinig

G.E.M. chronology
My Secret (2010)	Xposed (2012)	The Best of 2008–2012 (2013)

Singles from Xposed
- 1. "Someday I'll Fly" Released: March 14, 2012; 2. "What Have U Done" Released: May 12, 2012; 3. "Oh Boy" Released: July 2, 2012; 4. "Bubble" Released: October 14, 2012

Xposed is the third studio album by Hong Kong singer-songwriter G.E.M., released on digital platforms on June 27, 2012, by Hummingbird Music. The physical edition of the album was released on July 5, 2012, while a limited special edition was made available on July 10 in Hong Kong. The album's material contains tracks recorded in both Mandarin and Cantonese, with minor phrases in English. Its lyrics were penned entirely by G.E.M. whilst production was handled by various composers including G.E.M. and Lupo Groinig.

Musically, Xposed is primarily a pop album with elements of pop rock and R&B. It spawned several singles, including the hit "Bubble", "Someday I'll Fly", "What Have U Done", "Oh Boy". Commercially, the album saw success in Asia and reached the number one position on the HKRMA album chart in Hong Kong for two consecutive weeks. In support of the album, G.E.M. embarked on the X.X.X. Live Tour in April 2013, travelling across Asia, North America, Europe, and Oceania. It spanned 73 shows and attracted over 800,000 people.

== Background and release ==
Xposed chronicled G.E.M.'s growth experience and life insights since her last album, My Secret (2010). During this time, she experienced the illness of her grandmother as well as work and emotional pressure. G.E.M. cut her long hair and adopted a "rock" aesthetic as a gesture of a transformative chapter in her artistry.

The album was released digitally on June 27, 2012, while the physical edition was released in several countries in Asia on July 5, 2012. A limited special edition of the album was released exclusively in Hong Kong on July 10.

== Commercial performance ==
After its official release on July 5, the album reached number one on the sales charts of major record stores in Hong Kong, including HMV and CD Warehouse. In the first week after its release, Xposed reached number one on the Hong Kong Record Merchants Association (HKRMA) album chart, with the second and third places occupied by Maroon 5 and Linkin Park, respectively. It remained atop the sales chart for a second week.

== Accolades ==
The album was awarded the Best Selling Mandarin Album at the 2012 IFPI Hong Kong Top Sales Awards. It also brought G.E.M. her first Best Female Mandarin Singer nomination at 24th Golden Melody Awards in Taiwan, making her the youngest nominee ever for the category, at the age of 21.

At the Metro Radio Hits Music Awards, Xposed won the Album of the Year award, while "Someday I'll Fly" won the Metro Power Song of the Year Award. "What Have U Done" was named one of the Top 10 Songs at the 2012 Jade Solid Gold Best Ten Music Awards.

== Promotion and live performances ==
In support of the album, G.E.M. embarked on her second concert tour, the X.X.X. Live Tour, in April 2013 with five consecutive shows at the Hong Kong Coliseum. At the age of 21, she became the youngest Chinese singer to hold ten concerts at the venue. The tour spanned 73 shows in various countries in Asia, North America, Oceania, and Europe, and attracted 800,000 spectators in total.

== Track listing ==
Xposed – CD
No.	Title	Lyrics	Music	Language	Length
1.	"What Have U Done"	G.E.M.	Johnny Pederson, Michael Jay, Rike Boomgaarden	Cantonese, English	3:36
2.	"Next Second" (下一秒 (我們就要死掉); Xià yī miǎo (wǒmen jiù yào sǐ diào))	G.E.M.	Anthony Anderson, Steve Smith, Amanda Stott	Mandarin	3:12
3.	"Someday I'll Fly"	G.E.M.	Franzel Jeffrey B, Hollander Andrew B, Dana Parish	Cantonese, English	3:51
4.	"Bubble" (泡沫; Pàomò)	G.E.M.	G.E.M.	Mandarin	4:18
5.	"Inception" (潛意式的殘酷; Qián yì shì de cánkù)	G.E.M.	G.E.M., Lupo Groinig	Mandarin	3:58
6.	"Oh Boy"	G.E.M.	G.E.M., Lupo Groinig	Mandarin, English	3:04
7.	"After Tonight"	G.E.M.	G.E.M., Lupo Groinig	Mandarin, English	4:37
8.	"Distortion" (失真; Sat1zan1)	G.E.M.	Cousin Fung	Cantonese	3:57
9.	"Miracle" (奇蹟; Qíjī)	G.E.M.	G.E.M.	Mandarin	3:51
10.	"Non-Existent Existence" (不存在的存在; Bù cúnzài de cúnzài)	G.E.M.	G.E.M.	Mandarin	5:04
Total length:					39:28

Xposed – DVD
No.	Title	Length
1.	"Someday I'll Fly"	4:32
2.	"What Have U Done"	3:50
Total length:		8:22

== Charts ==
Chart positions for Xposed
Chart (2012)	Peak position
Hong Kong Albums (HKRMA)	1

== Release history ==
Release dates and formats for Xposed
Region	Date	Edition(s)	Format(s)	Label
Various	June 27, 2012	Standard edition	Digital download; streaming	Hummingbird Music
Hong Kong	July 5, 2012	Standard edition	CD	Hummingbird Music
China	July 5, 2012	Standard edition	CD	Hummingbird Music
Malaysia	July 5, 2012	Standard edition	CD	Hummingbird Music
Singapore	July 5, 2012	Standard edition	CD	Hummingbird Music
Hong Kong	July 10, 2012	Limited special edition	CD	Hummingbird Music
