= Walk on Water (G.E.M. song) =

Single by G.E.M.

from the album City Zoo
- Language: Mandarin; English
- Released: October 22, 2019
- Recorded: 2019
- Genre: Dance-pop
- Length: 3:31
- Label: G Nation
- Songwriter(s): G.E.M.
- Producer(s): G.E.M.; Terrence Ma

G.E.M. singles chronology
| "Miss Similar" (2019) | "Walk on Water" (2019) | "Full Stop" (2019) |

Music video
- "Walk on Water" on YouTube

"Walk on Water" is a song by Hong Kong singer-songwriter G.E.M., released as a single through G Nation on October 22, 2019. Written by G.E.M. and Terrence Ma, it is a dance-pop song with lyrics about growth and resilience.

The song was included in G.E.M.'s sixth studio album, City Zoo (2019), and was used as the theme song for the Chinese version of the film Terminator: Dark Fate (2019).

== Background ==
"Walk on Water" was conceived based on G.E.M's experiences with cyberbullying and perseverance. The song draws inspiration from the Jesus Lizard, an animal capable of walking on water to evade danger. G.E.M. used the animal as a metaphor to convey the message that during times of difficulty and adversity, one should not give up but embrace confidence to overcome personal limitations.

"I have faced desperate cyberbullying, fallen into emotional eating, occasionally overeating, and occasionally not eating at all, or received unreasonable, disrespected, and even unfair things at work... All these experiences have challenged my confidence, but made me more determined."

— G.E.M. discussing the inspiration behind "Walk on Water"

== Music video ==
The music video for "Walking on Water" was directed by Tian Xun and Xiao Tian and features G.E.M. performing the song interspersed with scenes from Terminator: Dark Fate (2019).

== Live performances ==
On December 31, 2019, G.E.M. performed the song at the 2020 Jiangsu Satellite TV New Year's Eve Concert in Macau. It was also added to the set list of her I Am Gloria World Tour.

== Track listing ==
- Digital download / streaming
1. "Walk on Water" – 3:31

== Credits and personnel ==
- G.E.M. – vocals, background vocals, lyrics, production
- Terrence Ma – production, arrangement
- Tian Xun – music video director
- Xiao Tian – music video director

== Charts ==
Chart performance for "Walk on Water"
| Chart (2019) | Peak position |
|---|---|
| China (TME UNI Chart) | 11 |

== Release history ==
Release dates and formats
| Region | Date | Format | Label |
|---|---|---|---|
| Various | October 22, 2019 | Digital download; streaming | G Nation |
