= Someday I'll Fly =

- Single cover

Single by G.E.M.

from the album Xposed
- Language: Cantonese; English
- Released: March 14, 2012
- Recorded: 2012
- Genre: Pop
- Length: 3:51
- Label: Hummingbird Music
- Songwriter(s): G.E.M.
- Producer(s): Franzel Jeffrey B; Hollander Andrew B; Dana Parish

G.E.M. singles chronology
"The Rose" (2010)	"Someday I'll Fly" (2012)	"What Have U Done" (2012)

Music video
- "Someday I'll Fly" on YouTube

"Someday I'll Fly" is a song by Hong Kong singer-songwriter G.E.M., serving as the first single for her third studio album, Xposed (2012). It was released via digital download and streaming through Hummingbird Music on March 14, 2012. Its lyrics were written by G.E.M., while Franzel Jeffrey B, Hollander Andrew B, and Dana Parish composed the track. Additional production and arrangement was handled by Lupo Groinig. Musically, "Someday I'll Fly" is a pop rock influenced number with aspirational lyrics.

== Background and release ==
"Someday I'll Fly"
A sample of "Someday I'll Fly", a pop number with lyrics revolving around embracing a fresh start.

Written by G.E.M., the lyrics of "Someday I'll Fly" chronicles her personal experiences from 2011 to 2012, during which she faced increasing pressures in her life. G.E.M. described this period as a time of struggle, as she sought to break free from everything weighing her down. She believed that "Someday I'll Fly" symbolized her determination to let go of those burdens and embrace a fresh start.

== Music video ==
The music video for "Someday I'll Fly", directed by Bill Chia, was shot over the course of 22 hours. It was uploaded to YouTube on April 7, 2012. G.E.M. plays the role of a ballet dancer in the video, having spent a month learning ballet to prepare for the video shoot. She saw the dance routines as a reflection of life's challenges and complexities; at the same time, she believed that like ballet, life should embody qualities of lightness, grace, and freedom.

== Accolades ==
Awards and nominations for "Someday I'll Fly"
Year	Organization	Award	Result	Ref.
2012	Metro Radio Mandarin Music Awards	Metro Song of the Year Award	Won	
2013	Canadian Chinese Pop Music Chart	Top Ten Songs Awards	Won	
2013	Sina Music Public Opinion Index Awards	Top 20 Songs	Won	

== Credits and personnel ==
=== Mixing ===
- Mixed at MixHaus Studios, Los Angeles

=== Personnel ===
- G.E.M. – vocals, background vocals
- Franzel Jeffrey B – composer
- Hollander Andrew B – composer
- Dana Parish – composer
- Lupo Groinig – producer and arranger
- Richard Furch – mixer

== Release history ==
Release dates and formats
Region	Date	Format	Label
Various	March 14, 2012	Digital download; streaming	Hummingbird Music
