= Tik Tok (G.E.M. song) =

Single by G.E.M.

from the EP My Fairytale
- Language: Mandarin
- Released: August 10, 2018
- Recorded: 2018
- Genre: Pop
- Length: 3:49
- Label: Hummingbird Music
- Songwriter(s): G.E.M.
- Producer(s): Lupo Groinig

G.E.M. singles chronology
"Victoria" (2017)	"Tik Tok" (2018)	"Woke" (2018)

Music video
- "Tik Tok" on YouTube

"Tik Tok" (Chinese: 倒数; pinyin: Dàoshǔ) is a song by Hong Kong singer-songwriter G.E.M., serving as the lead single for her third extended play My Fairytale (2018). Written by G.E.M. and produced by Austrian songwriter Lupo Groinig, "Tik Tok" is a dance-pop number with lyrics encompassing themes of romance. It was released via digital download and streaming on August 10, 2018, by Hummingbird Music.

"Tik Tok" was subject to positive reviews from music critics, who praised its production and composition. The song was a commercial success, peaking at number one on the Billboard Radio China Top 10 chart and the TME Singles Chart. The song received two accolades at regional award ceremonies, including the Hottest Mandarin Singer Award at the Migihui Awards and Top 10 Songs of the Year at the Billboard Radio China Awards.

The accompanying music video for "Tik Tok" was directed by Birdy Nio and was filmed in Inner Mongolia, China. It features Taiwanese actor Tender Huang portraying the singer's romantic interest. G.E.M. performed "Tik Tok" at several award shows and events in the Greater China region, and included it on the set lists of two of her world tours: the Queen of Hearts World Tour (2017–2019) and the I Am Gloria World Tour (2023–present).

== Background and release ==
G.E.M. performed "Tik Tok" on iQiyi's "Idol Hits" and shared the creative process that it only took three minutes for the song to be completed, claiming it to be "fate".

== Music video ==
On August 10, 2018, G.E.M. released the music video for her single "Tik Tok" which was shot in Inner Mongolia, featuring Taiwanese actor Tender Huang. The production spanned three days and features G.E.M. embarking on a journey to Inner Mongolia where she encounters a couple. She imagines the couple escaping with her car for a joyride, and images herself in the scenario of developing romantic feelings for the male lead. She then discovers a concealed bomb in the rear of the car, equipped with a countdown timer, symbolizing the imminent eruption of conflicts and issues within the couple's relationship. The video ends in a cliffhanger, with G.E.M. attempting to disarm the bomb located in the trunk.

In October 2018, the song's music video on exceeded 100 million views on various platforms worldwide. On June 3, 2020, the music video exceeded 100 million views on YouTube, making G.E.M. the first Chinese female singer and Hong Kong singer to have three music videos that exceeded 100 million views on the platform, tied with Taiwanese singer Jay Chou.

== Credits and personnel ==
- G.E.M. – vocals, background vocals
- Lupo Groinig – producer, keys/synths & programming, executive producer
- Sam Vahdat – keys/synths & programming
- Richard Furch – mixing
- Reuben Cohen – mastering
- Tan Chang – executive producer

== Charts ==
=== Weekly charts ===
Chart (2018–2019)	Peak position
China (China Top 100)	2
China (TME UNI Chart)	1
China Airplay (Billboard Radio China)	1
Singapore Regional (RIAS)	15

=== Year-end charts ===
Chart (2018)	Position
China Airplay (Billboard Radio China)	7

== Release history ==
Release dates and formats
Region	Date	Format	Label
Various	August 10, 2018	Digital download; streaming	Hummingbird Music
