= This Is MC =

2023 Cantopop studio album

This is MC

Studio album by MC Cheung
- Released: January 20, 2023
- Genre: Cantopop
- Length: 33:19
- Label: Warner Music Hong Kong
- Producer: Terry Chui; Gareth Chan; Edward Chan

MC Cheung chronology
Have a Good Time (2021)	This is MC (2023)

This is MC is a studio album by Hong Kong singer MC Cheung, released by Warner Music Hong Kong in January 2023. The album reached the number one spot on the Hong Kong Record Merchants Association weekly album chart. It features three chart-topping singles, "Caution Wet Floor", "A Gentleman's Guide to Old-Fashioned Dating", and "The One For U". To accommodate the album's release, Cheung held a three-day live concert at the Hong Kong Coliseum.

== Background and release ==
Following the release of his debut EP in December 2021, MC Cheung proceeded to unveil a series of standalone singles throughout 2022, all of which were subsequently incorporated into the album alongside other new songs. This is MC was digitally released on January 20, 2023, with the physical album following on March 15, 2023. The album is said to highlight Cheung's exploration of new experiments, diverse themes, musical styles, and visuals.

== Singles and composition ==
"Caution Wet Floor" is a rock-oriented song that explores the theme of karma, tracing the transformation of a kind-hearted individual who, faced with unjust consequences, undergoes a dark evolution filled with resentment. Cheung deliberately executed the song with "a contrasting and intense mood", particularly towards the end, to amplify the detestable tone inherent in the lyrics. The lyrics, penned by Wyman Wong, draw inspiration from the anger-driven rock music and Wong's personal life disappointments. Despite the words carrying a sense of raging anger, Wong revealed that the initial inspiration for the title "Caution Wet Floor" stemmed from a vision of two individuals skating together, sharing a sweet moment. The term "floor" in the lyrics represents the numerous life traps, cautioning against the ubiquitous challenges and hidden dangers. The song peaked at number one on the Hong Kong Songs chart.

"A Gentleman's Guide to Old-Fashioned Dating" is an attempt to blend R&B and traditional Chinese sounds. During a collaborative songwriting session with Goo Chan, Cheung stumbled upon his demo, leading them to complete the song together. Its concept involves incorporating elements of "time travel" and introducing traditional Chinese instruments like the guzheng in the chorus to enhance the song's depth. The lyrics align with this concept, depicting a bittersweet love story that transitions between the "modern" era before the chorus and shifts into the "ancient" era during the chorus. Also written by Wyman Wong, the lyrics draw inspiration from a prose piece by the late Taiwanese author Weijing Li. The song also peaked atop the Hong Kong Songs.

"Overkill" is characterized as an EDM track infused with a K-pop-influenced flavor, featuring rhythmic beats and sharp synths. The lyrics are highlighted by phrases like "Going non stop / Every time the beat drops / Going non stop / I can hear no pin drops". The music video presents Cheung as a character of both righteousness and wickedness, demonstrating his dancing skills for the first time.

"The One For U" is described as a R&B track, with an additional duet version featuring Kiri. With Wyman Wong serving as the lyricist for the third time, the song expresses a deep and devoted love, emphasizing the importance of being the number one in someone's heart and the joy of having that special person by your side. The original version reached the top position at number one while the duet version peaked at number 12 on Hong Kong Songs chart. Its music video also topped YouTube Hong Kong's year-end list.

== Promotion and reception ==
The album peaked at number one on Hong Kong Record Merchants Association weekly "Best-selling albums" chart, maintaining a position in the Top Ten for eight weeks. To accommodate the album release, Cheung held three consecutive sold-out live concerts titled This is MC at the Hong Kong Coliseum on January 20–22, 2023.

== Track listing ==
No.	Title	Writer(s)	Producer(s)	Length
1.	"Overkill"	HRDR; Jason Guerra; Luyo; Richard Lam	Terry Chui	3:18
2.	"This is MC"	Dash Guy; Moode; Orae; Richard Lam	Terry Chui	3:13
3.	"The One For U (世一)"	Jay Fung; JNYBeatz; Gareth Chan; Young Hysan; Wyman Wong	Gareth Chan	4:23
4.	"A Gentleman's Guide to Old-Fashioned Dating (老派約會之必要)"	MC Cheung; Goo Chan; Wyman Wong	Terry Chui	3:43
5.	"Obedience (乖乖報到)"	Terry Chui; Tsang Lok-tung	Terry Chui	3:38
6.	"Fun Fair (只限成人入場)"	SeaTravel; Richard Lam; Hong Jian-rui; Wang Zi-min	Gareth Chan	3:23
7.	"Caution Wet Floor (小心地滑)"	Terry Chui; Wyman Wong	Terry Chui	3:59
8.	"Assurance (最低保障)"	Lesta Cheng; Richard Lam	Terry Chui	4:01
9.	"Drink Up (乾)"	Raymond Wan; Erin Yan	Edward Chan	3:39
Total length:				33:19

Deluxe edition (bonus track)
No.	Title	Writer(s)	Producer(s)	Length
10.	"The One For U (Not For Me) (世一 (不可一世)) (feat. Kiri T.)"	Jay Fung; JNYBeatz; Gareth Chan; Wyman Wong	Gareth Chan	4:23
Total length:				37:43

== Personnel ==
Credits for This is MC adapted from AllMusic.

- MC Cheung – vocals, background vocals, composer
- Anson Chan – arranger
- Edward Chan – arranger, producer, programming, recording
- Gareth Chan – composer, producer
- Chan Hsien-che – guitar
- Lesta Cheng – composer
- Fergus Chow – arranger, bass, piano, programming
- Terry Chui – arranger, bass, choir/chorus, composer, drums, keyboards, mixing, piano, producer, programming, synthesizer, background vocals
- Lee Yat-ding – drums
- Enzo – programming
- Susan French – violin
- Jay Fung – composer
- Goo Chan – composer, arranger, guitar
- Dash Guy – arranger, bass, composer, keyboards
- Cass Ho – viola
- Gallant Ho – violin
- HRDR – arranger, composer, programming
- Young Hysan – lyricist
- JNYBeatz – composer
- Chan Siu-kei – bass
- Anna Kwan – cello
- Jackson Lam – lyricist
- Leslie Quartets – strings
- Luyo – composer
- Wang Zi-min – composer
- Moode – arranger, composer
- Orae – arranger, composer, drums, synthesizer
- Álex Psaroudakis – mastering engineer
- Jackel Pun – guitar
- Katrina Rafferty – violin
- Hong Jian-rui – composer
- Leslie Ryan – violin
- Leslie Moonsun Ryang – violin
- SeaTravel – arranger, composer, guitar, programming
- Derrick Sepnio – arranger, guitar
- Zhang Shu-ying – viola
- Matthew Sim – mixing
- Soho – choir/chorus
- Jay Tse – mixing engineer
- Nic Tsui – guitar
- Tsang Lok-tung – lyricist
- Jason Guerra Valencia – composer
- Raymond Wan – arranger, composer, guitar, programming, background vocals
- Miyaka Suzuki Wilson – violin
- Nick Wong – arranger, piano, synthesizer
- Wyman Wong – lyricist
- Erin Yan – lyricist

== Charts ==
=== Weekly charts ===
Chart	Peak position
Hong Kong Albums (HKRMA)	1

== Release history ==
Release dates and formats for This is MC
Region	Date	Version	Format(s)	Label	Ref.
Worldwide	January 20, 2023	Standard	digital download; streaming	Warner Music Hong Kong	
Worldwide	March 15, 2023	Deluxe	CD; digital download; streaming	Warner Music Hong Kong	
