= Have a Good Time (MC Cheung album) =

2021 Cantopop EP

EP by MC Cheung
- Released: December 22, 2021
- Genre: Cantopop
- Length: 22:52
- Label: Warner Music Hong Kong
- Producer: Randy Chow; Schumann; Terry Chui; Gareth Chan; T-ma

MC Cheung chronology
Have a Good Time (2021)	This is MC (2023)

Have a Good Time is the debut extended play (EP) by Hong Kong singer MC Cheung, released by Warner Music Hong Kong in December 2021. The track "Pillow Talk" reached number one on the Hong Kong Songs, while "Overruled" and "About Time" reached the top five. The album itself peaked at number three on Hong Kong Record Merchants Association weekly "Best-selling albums" chart. To accommodate the album release, Cheung held two consecutive Have A Good Time – Meet & Greet concerts.

== Background and release ==
MC Cheung gained recognition and rose to fame after finishing as the runner-up in the viuTV's singing competition King Maker II (2019). Despite receiving an offer to join a boyband, he declined to prioritize his individual artistic freedom. Initially aspiring to establish his own company, he faced challenges due to limited resources and connections. Recognizing the need for support, Cheung signed a record label deal with Warner Music Hong Kong in December 2020. Prior to securing the deal, he regularly posted song cover videos on his personal YouTube channel. Starting with the debut single "Good Time" in March 2021, the initial plan was to release a total of four standalone singles during the year. Subsequently, these songs were incorporated into the EP. The digital version of the album was released on various streaming platforms on December 22, 2021, followed by the physical album release on December 30, 2021. The songs predominantly feature R&B influence, reflecting Cheung's love for the genre.

== Singles and composition ==
The opening track, "Good Time", features an upbeat R&B melody and lyrically encourages embracing a positive mindset and living a fulfilling life even in challenging times. Cheung noted during the recording process, producer Randy Chow prioritized his expressive interpretation, emphasizing emotions rather than solely considering his vocal condition at the time. The second track, "Overruled", composed by Jay Fung in 2017, instantly captured Cheung's heart with its ad-lib in the demo's prelude. The song was said to harmoniously merge R&B with a rich commercial appeal, conveying the message of unwavering love in the face of opposition. The song peaked at number two digitally on the Hong Kong Songs chart, and its music video ranked ninth among the Top Ten YouTube videos of the year. On Spotify, it ranked second on the local "Top 10 Newcomer Songs".

The third track, "Pillow Talk", is an emotional ballad that narrates the experience of facing lingering memories after a breakup, which are not easily erased, resulting in a complex web of emotions. The song topped the Hong Kong Songs for 12 weeks, and its music video accumulated more than 20 million YouTube views. A music critic praised the song for its impeccable "mood, layers, and emotional impact", effectively conveying "genuine feelings without any pretense". As of November 2022, the song accumulated 8.69 million plays on Spotify. The fourth track, "Loser", is a Lo-Fi R&B song that lyrically captures the inner thoughts of a man coping with the abandonment of his partner, approaching heartbreak with a sense of ease. To establish an emotional connection with the song, Cheung and the producer, Gareth Chan, shared their dating and emotional experiences prior to recording. They also tried out diverse rap styles, ranging from the comical to a "black" aesthetic.

Cheung co-wrote the fifth track, "About Time", which is another emotional piece that lyrically portrays bittersweetness of farewell. The song reached number three on the chart. The last track, "How Many Times", is the English version of "Overruled". Jay Fung personally penned the lyrics during a period when his career was struggling, reflecting his imagination that his significant other would leave him. Fung and Cheung released a live studio duet version in July 2021.

== Promotion and reception ==
The album peaked at number three on Hong Kong Record Merchants Association weekly "Best-selling albums" chart, maintaining a position in the Top Ten for at least three weeks. In conjunction with the album release, Cheung organized two consecutive concerts titled Have A Good Time – Meet & Greet on December 13–14, 2021, during which he performed his original works as well as covers of songs by other artists.

== Track listing ==
No.	Title	Writer(s)	Producer(s)	Length
1.	"Good Time"	Jimmy Brown; Soho; Adams Wu; Jackson Lam	Randy Chow	2:46
2.	"Overruled (反對無效)"	Cameron Browne; Jay Fung; Chan Wing-him	Schumann	3:48
3.	"Pillow Talk (記憶棉)"	Terry Chui; Jackson Lam	Terry Chui	4:33
4.	"Loser"	JNYBeatz; T-Rexx; Gareth Chan	Gareth Chan	4:13
5.	"About Time (時候不早)"	Goo Chan; MC Cheung; Cheng Man; T-ma	T-ma	3:40
6.	"How Many Times"	Cameron Browne; Jay Fung	Schumann	3:49
Total length:				22:52

== Personnel ==
Credits for Have a Good Time adapted from AllMusic.

- MC Cheung – vocals, background vocals, composer
- Randy Chow – producer, arranger, guitar, programming, synthesizer programming
- Jimmy Brown – composer
- Soho – composer, background vocals
- Adams Wu – composer
- Vigilant Nation – arranger
- Jackson Lam – lyricist
- Cousin Fung – background vocals
- Alex Burke – synthesizer, wurlitzer
- Ramage Jacobs – guitar
- Courtney Jones – trumpet
- Padget Nanton III – drums
- Jon Reshard – bass
- Matthew Sim – mixing
- Schumann – producer
- Cameron Browne – composer
- Jay Fung – composer, lyricist
- Yusuke Hatano – arranger, keyboards, programming
- Chan Wing-him – lyricist
- Kwan Tan An Anna – cello
- Rayvon Covington – bass
- Leslie Moonsun Ryang – violin
- Wong Chung-yin – guitar
- Terry Chui – producer, arranger, bass, composer, drums, piano, programming, synthesizer
- Nick Wong – arranger
- Leslie Quartets – strings
- Gareth Chan – producer, arranger, composer, drums, keyboards, programming, synthesizer
- JNYBeatz – arranger, composer, keyboards, synthesizer
- Su Dao-zhe – producer, arranger, keyboards
- T-Rexx – lyricist
- Darrell – bass
- Derrick Sepnio – guitar
- T-ma – producer, composer, lyricist
- Goo Chan – composer
- Cheng Man – lyricist
- Nic Tsui – arranger, guitar

== Charts ==
=== Weekly charts ===
Chart	Peak position
Hong Kong Albums (HKRMA)	3

== Release history ==
Release dates and formats for Have A Good Time
Region	Date	Version	Format(s)	Label	Ref.
Worldwide	December 22, 2021	Standard	digital download; streaming	Warner Music Hong Kong	
Worldwide	December 30, 2021	Standard	CD	Warner Music Hong Kong	
