= My Fairytale =

EP by G.E.M.
- Released: August 30, 2018
- Recorded: 2018
- Genre: Pop
- Length: 10:50
- Language: Mandarin
- Label: Hummingbird
- Producer: Lupo Groinig

G.E.M. chronology
25 Looks (2016)	My Fairytale (2018)	Fearless (2018)

Singles from My Fairytale
- 1. "Tik Tok" Released: August 10, 2018

My Fairytale (Chinese: 另一個童話) is the third extended play (EP) by Hong Kong singer-songwriter G.E.M., released on August 30, 2018, by Hummingbird Music. It serves as the first part of G.E.M.'s "fairytale" trilogy, which led up to the release of the singer's fifth studio album, Happily Ever After (2019). The EP spawned the single "Tik Tok".

== Background and release ==
My Fairytale was conceived out of G.E.M.'s realization of her musical aspirations. The melody weaves a tale of love and explores various interpretations of a fairytale. She shared with Billboard Radio China that "Life isn't exactly a fairytale", adding that "This new EP depicts my fairytale that I found in the real world."

G.E.M.'s long-time producer Lupo Groinig told Billboard Radio China, "This release marks our 10-year anniversary working together. The new songs really showcase how far she has come as an artist and songwriter." The cover artwork of the EP was designed by Canadian illustrator Giselle Ukardi.

== Singles ==
"Tik Tok" tells the story of "infinite love throughout life". The music video for the song was shot in Inner Mongolia, China.

== Track listing ==
My Fairytale track listing
No.	Title	Lyrics	Music	Length
1.	"Tik Tok"	G.E.M.	G.E.M., Lupo Groinig	3:49
2.	"Rightfully Wrong"	G.E.M.	G.E.M., Lupo Groinig	3:58
3.	"My Fairytale"	G.E.M.	G.E.M.	3:03
Total length:				10:50

== Credits and personnel ==
Credits from the liner notes of Happily Ever After.

- G.E.M. – vocals, background vocals, lyricist, composer
- Lupo Groinig – producer, keyboard, synths, programming
- Sam Vahdat – keyboard, synths, programming
- Richard Furch – mixing
- Reuben Cohen – mastering
- Tan Chang – executive producer, A&R, art direction
- Giselle Ukardi – graphic designer

== Release history ==
Release dates and formats for My Fairytale
Region	Date	Format	Label
Various	August 30, 2018	Digital download; streaming	Hummingbird Music
