= City Zoo =

2019 studio album by G.E.M.

Studio album by G.E.M.
- Released: December 27, 2019
- Recorded: March–December 2019
- Genre: Pop
- Length: 49:31
- Language: Mandarin
- Label: G Nation; Sony
- Producer: G.E.M.; Terrence Ma

G.E.M. chronology
Happily Ever After (2018)	City Zoo (2019)	Revelation (2022)

Singles from City Zoo
- 1. "Full Stop" Released: November 22, 2019; 2. "City Zoo" Released: December 13, 2019; 3. "Selfless" Released: December 27, 2019

City Zoo (Chinese: 摩天動物園; pinyin: Mótiān dòngwùyuán) is the sixth studio album by Hong Kong singer-songwriter G.E.M., released on December 27, 2019, by Sony Music. As the executive producer, G.E.M. worked with producer Terrence Ma. The self-written album was done after G.E.M.'s departure from her former record label Hummingbird Music Limited in early 2019. It was produced and finished within eight months.

City Zoo marks G.E.M.'s first time acting in multiple creative roles, including the system director, music video director, visual director, and creative and planning director. Entirely produced by G.E.M. and Terrence Ma, the record blends pop and dance elements with influences from various genres such as trap music, electronic music, rock, rhythm blues, and other musical styles. Its lyrics touches on themes of self-worth, romance, and relationships.

The concept of the album uses the idea of animals as a metaphor to human nature, outlining the different aspects as well as expressing the voices of human beings between animal and nature. Each track represents a different animal and reflects themes of social phenomena and relationships. The album also includes a collaboration with Taiwanese singer Eric Chou.

City Zoo was preceded by the singles "Full Stop", "City Zoo", and "Selfless". The tracks "Miss Similar" and "Walk on Water" were also included in the album's track list, with the latter serving as the theme for the Chinese version of the film Terminator: Dark Fate (2019). The song "Long After" served as the theme for the film Do You Love Me As I Love You (2020).

== Background ==
City Zoo is an album that fully realizes G.E.M.'s vision from the concept of the album from song to song creation, music production, visual creativity, and event planning and promotion. The album starts from the human nature she has experienced in the past, turning her observation and care into lyrics. Each song uses metaphorical methods to convey the status of interpersonal relationships or social phenomena through an animal image.

== Music and lyrics ==
The album begins with the album title track, which incorporates a large number of hip-hop arrangements, Describe the living postures of various animals, and reflect social phenomena, and sneer at the dark side that everyone may appear at some moment and hope that everyone can clear the temptation of false lies with the clearest vision and make the best choice. The second track "Fly Away" is a very melancholy song, and the symbolic animal is owl. Through this song, G.E.M. hopes to express her inner struggle and desire to share the mood with others, not to hear from others consolation, the producer used a very complicated rhythm set with G.E.M. whispering and multi-segmentation, and some echo effects, successfully creating the effect of empty echoes in the forest.

The third song "Selfless" symbolizes the animal as a chameleon. The song describes the state of being too fond of the other party and fascinates itself with the pulling state. When it is completely for the other party that it wants to sacrifice itself, in the end, it will only endure all the pain alone. The fourth track, "Long After" is symbolize the animals as cats. On December 18, the listening session shared the sound source of the song. The song describes that if it is injured, it can only hide in the corner and lick the wound, but it must be strong in front of people. The fifth track, "Walk on Water" is a very self-confident song. The representative animal of this song is the Jesus Lizard. When they are in danger, they can walk on the water to escape. This is exactly the meaning of the song: In times of difficulties and wind and waves, refuse to lose, don't retreat, and breakthrough with confidence. The sixth track, "Mama" is a song that G.E.M. written to her mother. The representative animal of this song is fireflies. This song describes about mother's love.

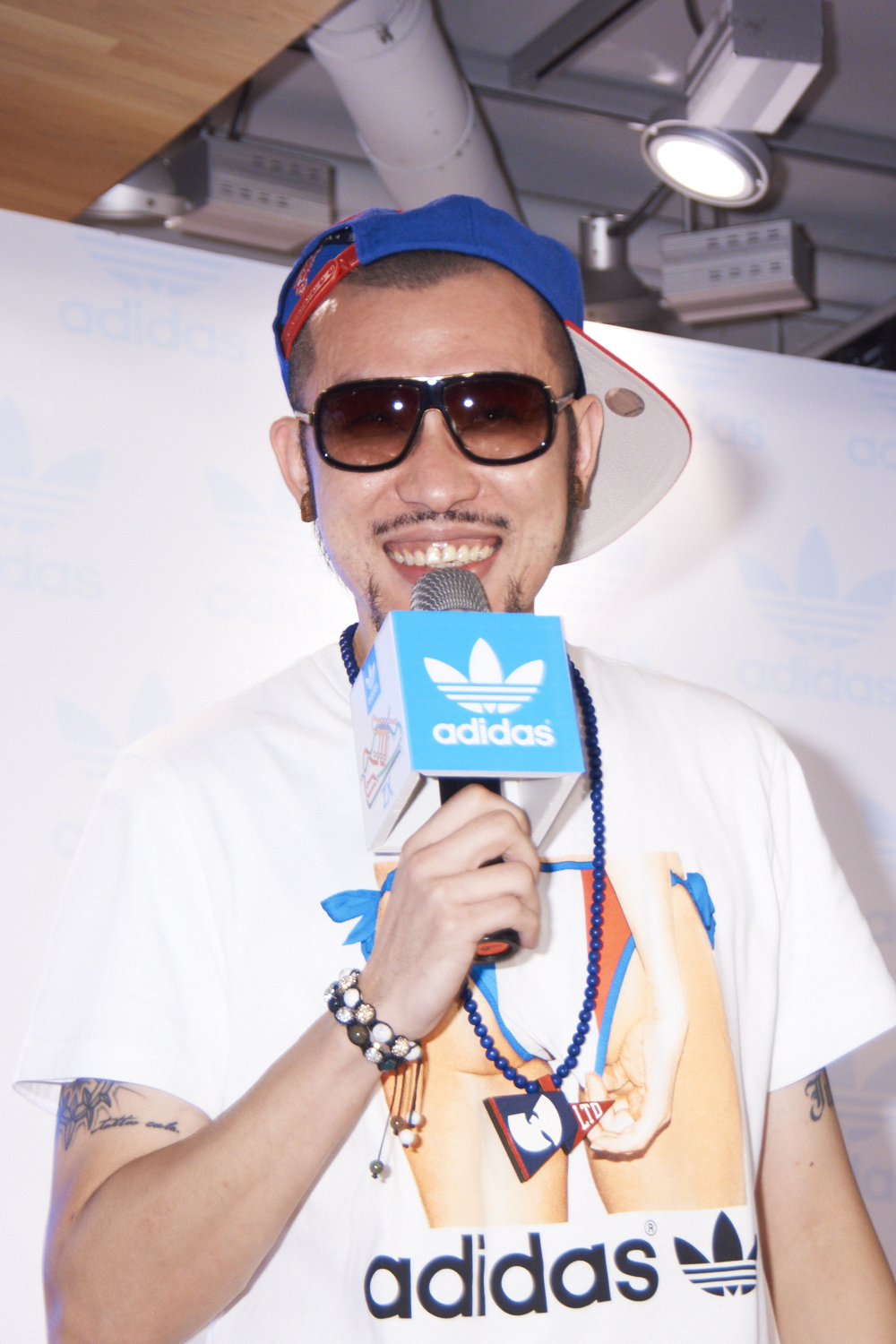
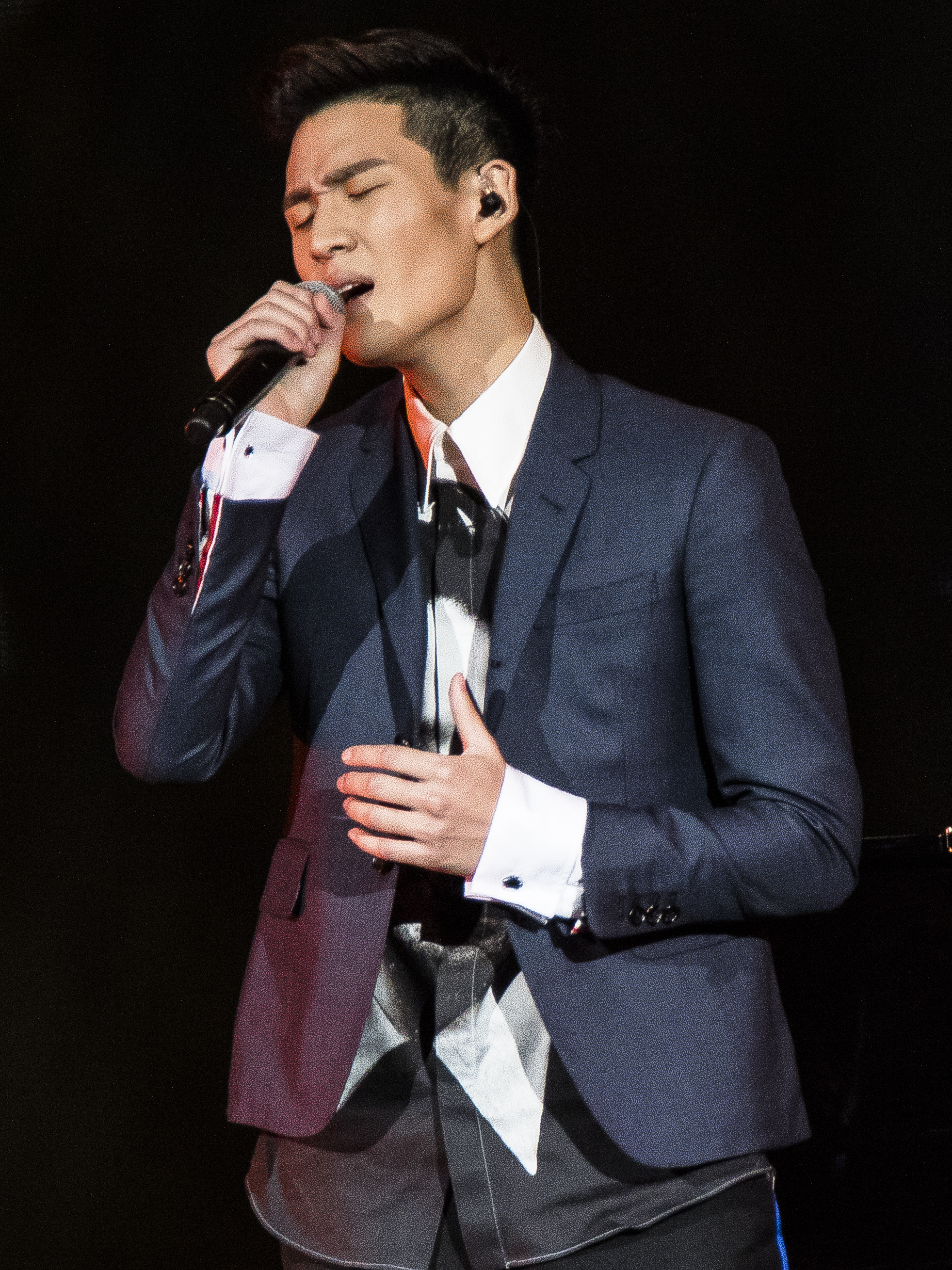
"Miss Similar" is adapted from MC HotDog's "Almost Mr." (left), and "Don't Force It" is a duet with Eric Chou (right).

The seventh track, "Grey Wolf" does not want to show the slyness of the wolf, but G.E.M. hopes to let everyone reflect on the facts we see through the wolf. The overall arrangement is very modern, and a lot of effort has been put into vocal processing. The echo of the sound, more reveals the lingering blur and the sly hidden features of the wolf that the music wants to show. The eighth track, "Miss Similar" symbolizes the animal as a peacock, and describes this generation of imitation, giving birth to all kinds of strange ecology and humans. It is the only rap song in the album. The ninth track, "Missing You" is a pure guitar's ballad song. It rumors is a love song that written for G.E.M.'s current couple, Mark Ngai. The song is not symbolized or representative any animal. The tenth track, "Don't Force It" is a duet song featuring Eric Chou, representing the animal as a hedgehog. The "hedgehog's hug" is used to compare the state of a relationship. The two voices overlap to perfectly explain the heartbreak in love. The eleventh track, "Unreachable" is using a very strong synthesizer sounds, symbolizing as a butterfly. The song describes precious things that are often not caught, and thank you for helping you along the way.

The twelfth track, "Full Stop". The representative animal of this song is the hummingbird. With G.E.M. song reviewing the 12 years of her artistic career, she once learned a blank piece of paper. Some things that cannot be conceded, tolerant of others are cruel to herself. She also hopes to use songs to encourage all those who stand at the crossroads of life and are confused about the future. Those who are in the middle of the authorities are confused and look up at the vast sky. No matter how hard the front is, it is right to face the challenge. It is not so difficult to draw a "full stop". The last track of the album, "Still That Girl", which was also added later. G.E.M. wrote down the limitations and pains of life and showed her determination not to be defeated by reality.

== Release ==
The album was released on December 27, 2019, by Sony Music Taiwan, the first album by G.E.M. to be released under the label since her departure from Hummingbird Music Limited in March 2019. The standard edition was physically released on CD, as well as made available for digital download and streaming. The album was started to pre-save on December 13, 2019, which is the same day of the listening session of City Zoo and released of the album title track as single. The album trailer was released on YouTube on December 10, 2019.

== Singles ==
The song "Full Stop" serves as the album's lead single. It was released along with its accompanying music video on November 22, 2019. The song was top all the KKBox daily and singles and new songs chart in Hong Kong and Taiwan. The music video earned 2 million views worldwide on YouTube on its first day of release. As of June 2020, the music video has gained over 28 million views on YouTube. It peaked at number 1 on KKBox weekly Chinese charts in Hong Kong and Taiwan for 3 weeks.

During the listening session on December 13, 2019, G.E.M. premiered the music video of the title track and announced the title track as the second single off the album. The music video contained an interpolation of Michael Jackson album art cover and several art cover and movies. It reached the top 5 of KKBox daily and weekly chart in Hong Kong and Taiwan.

The third single, "Selfless" serves as the third single off the album. It was released along the music video on December 27, 2019, 12 hours after the album had been released. The song debuted at number 2 on the KKBox Taiwan daily new song chart and number 8 on Taiwan daily single chart. It reached a new peak of number 1 on two of the chart. It also peaked at number 1 on the KKBox Hong Kong daily new song chart and number 2 on Hong Kong daily single chart. also No. 1 on Malaysia and Singapore's KKBox streaming chart and 3 weeks number 2 on China's largest music streaming platform Tencent's QQ music.

The songs "Miss Similar" and "Walk on Water" were released before the lead single was released. Those singles were released as stand-alone singles and the tracks in the album, not released as the album single.

== Critical reception ==
Professional ratings
Review scores
Source	Rating
Douban Music	5 stars

The album City Zoo was generally well received after its release. Positive evaluations indicate that each song in the album has distinctive features, and in addition, the arrangement has also been well received. Some commented that this was a new peak of Chinese music, pointing out that G.E.M.'s used very spoken but profound music to show her struggling during this period of time and her 12 years of debut. The entire album arranges climaxes, and the rhythm is properly controlled. Adding experimental human voice effects in many places makes people appreciate the arrangement and lyrics of the arranger, and the symbol of animals, making the album more complete and interesting. Many music critics have pointed out that although there have been significant improvements in lyric writing, individual songs are still weak, and the album's idea integrity is slightly inferior.

== Promotion and live performances ==
A few weeks before the expected release of the album, Tang invited a selected group of fans to the City Zoo listening sessions, the live listening sessions were streaming on YouTube on December 13, 2019. During the listening sessions, G.E.M. and her team was premiere the music video of the album title track and released it as the album's second single.

G.E.M. promoted the album and its songs on several live performances. On November 30, 2019, G.E.M. made the first live performance of "Full Stop" at the 2019 AFA Asian Fashion Awards at Taipei City, Taiwan. On December 18, 2019, G.E.M. held a new song listening session, sharing with the live media and fans new works that have not been exposed. On December 26, 2019, a new album launch event was held in Beijing, China.

== Track listing ==
Track listing and credits adapted from the album liner notes, Apple Music.

All tracks are written by G.E.M. and produced by G.E.M. and Terrence Ma.

City Zoo track listing
No.	Title	Length
1.	"City Zoo" (摩天動物園; Mótiān dòngwùyuán)	4:30
2.	"Fly Away"	3:58
3.	"Selfless" (透明; Tòumíng)	3:37
4.	"Long After" (很久以後; Hěnjiǔ yǐhòu)	4:50
5.	"Walk on Water"	3:31
6.	"Mama" (螢火; Yíng huǒ)	3:50
7.	"Grey Wolf" (灰狼; Huī láng)	3:23
8.	"Miss Similar" (差不多姑娘; Chàbùduō gūniáng)	3:50
9.	"Missing You" (好想好想你; Hǎo xiǎng hǎo xiǎng nǐ)	3:24
10.	"Don't Force It" (別勉強; Bié miǎnqiáng; featuring Eric Chou)	4:42
11.	"Unreachable" (多美麗; Duō měilì)	3:41
12.	"Full Stop" (句號; Jùhào)	3:55
13.	"Still That Girl" (依然睡公主; Yīrán shuì gōngzhǔ)	2:40
Total length:		49:31

== Charts ==
Chart (2019–2020)	Peak position
Hong Kong Albums (HKRMA)	1

== Certifications ==
Region	Certification	Certified units/sales
Singapore (RIAS)	Gold	5,000^{*}
^{*} Sales figures based on certification alone.

== Release history ==
Release dates and formats for City Zoo
Region	Date	Format(s)	Edition(s)	Label
Various	December 13, 2019	Digital download; streaming	Standard	G Nation
Taiwan; China	December 27, 2019	CD	Standard; pre-order limited	G Nation; Sony
Taiwan; China	August 15, 2021	Vinyl LP	Limited	G Nation; Sony
