= Full Stop (G.E.M. song) =

Single by G.E.M.

from the album City Zoo
- Language: Mandarin
- Released: November 22, 2019
- Recorded: 2019
- Genre: Mandopop
- Length: 3:55
- Label: G Nation; Sony Music Taiwan
- Songwriter: G.E.M.
- Producers: Terrence Ma; G.E.M.

G.E.M. singles chronology
"Walk on Water" (2019)	"Full Stop" (2019)	"City Zoo" (2019)

Music video
- "Full Stop" on YouTube

"Full Stop" (Chinese: 句号; pinyin: Jù hào) is a song by Hong Kong singer-songwriter G.E.M. for her seventh studio album, City Zoo (2019). G.E.M. produced the song with Terrence Ma, and it was released via digital platforms on November 22, 2019, by Sony Music Taiwan as the lead single from the album. "Full Stop" is a pop number with a retro-styled musical motif, with lyrics discussing the drama surrounding the relationship and her experiences with her previous record label, Hummingbird Music Limited.

"Full Stop" peaked at number one on the TME Uni Chart in China and remained on the chart for six weeks. In Singapore, it peaked at number nine on the RIAS Regional chart. The accompanying music video for "Full Stop" was directed by Birdy Nio as was uploaded to the singer's YouTube channel on the same day as its digital release. The pink-hued visual features G.E.M. performing the song in a forest, a prairie, and a beach. It was included on the set list for her I Am Gloria World Tour, which she embarked on in December 2023.

== Background and composition ==
Through the song "Full Stop", G.E.M reminisces upon her 12-year musical journey. She, from a blank slate, learnt a difficult truth; some pursuits are not worth conceding, tolerance to others is cruelty to oneself. Speaking to her same realisation; those who are conflicted at the crossroads of life, uncertain about the future, are confused simply for they are trapped in the feverish midst of it all. All it takes, is to glance up at the vast sky; you'd notice that, even as the path ahead appears treacherous, it will be worth facing head on. Perhaps, it was never that difficult to draw a "Full Stop".

The symbolic animal of this song is a hummingbird, referencing her producers at Hummingbird Music.

== Music video and promotion ==
The music video was released on YouTube on November 22, 2019, the same day of the single released. The music video was directed by Birdy Nio. In the video, G.E.M.'s hairstyle reflected the styling from her earlier albums and showcased looks from the beginning of her career, particularly from 18..., My Secret, and "All About U".

The music video earned a million views on the first day of released. It earned two million views on the following day. As of June 2020, the music video has gained over 28 million views.

=== Live performances ===
G.E.M. performed "Full Stop" at the 2020 Jiangsu Satellite TV New Year's Eve Concert on December 31, 2019, which was held at the Cotai Arena in Macau. On January 5, 2020, she performed it live at the 2019 Kugou Live Annual Ceremony in Guangzhou. On January 18, she performed it at the 15th KKBOX Chart Awards held at the Taipei Arena in Taiwan. On February 28, 2021, she sang it at the Weibo Night 2020 even held at the Mercedes-Benz Arena in Shanghai.

== Accolades ==
"Full Stop" was named one of the professionally recommended top ten Mandarin songs by the Canadian Chinese Pop Music Awards. It received the Top Ten Golden Songs Award at the 2020 Miguhui Awards and the 2021 Tencent Music Entertainment Festival.

== Track listing ==
- Digital download / streaming
1. "Full Stop" – 3:55

== Credits and personnel ==
- G.E.M. – vocals, songwriter, producer
- Terrence Ma – producer
- Richard Furch – mixer, producer
- Birdy Nio – music video director

== Charts ==
Chart performance for "Full Stop"
Chart (2019)	Peak position
China (TME UNI Chart)	1
Singapore Regional (RIAS)	9

== Release history ==
Country	Date	Format	Label	Ref.
Various	November 22, 2019	Digital download; streaming	Sony Music Taiwan	
