= Billboard China Airplay/FL =

International record chart in China for songs

The Billboard China Airplay/FL (simplified Chinese: 中国公告牌电台外语音乐榜; traditional Chinese: 中國公告牌電台外語音樂榜) was a record chart published weekly by Billboard China that measured the airplay of foreign language songs in China, based on audience impressions from a panel of radio stations compiled by Nielsen-CCData.

== List of number one songs ==
| Week of | Song | Artist | Ref. |
|---|---|---|---|
| April 29, 2019 | "Me!" | Taylor Swift feat. Brendon Urie | |
| May 6, 2019 | "Me!" | Taylor Swift feat. Brendon Urie | |
| May 13, 2019 | "Old Town Road" | Lil Nas X | |
| May 20, 2019 | "Old Town Road" | Lil Nas X | |
| May 27, 2019 | "Old Town Road" | Lil Nas X | |
| June 3, 2019 | "I Don't Care" | Ed Sheeran & Justin Bieber | |
| June 10, 2019 | "I Don't Care" | Ed Sheeran & Justin Bieber | |
| June 17, 2019 | "I Don't Care" | Ed Sheeran & Justin Bieber | |
| June 24, 2019 | "If I Can't Have You" | Shawn Mendes | |
| July 1, 2019 | "Señorita" | Shawn Mendes & Camila Cabello | |
| July 8, 2019 | "Señorita" | Shawn Mendes & Camila Cabello | |
| July 15, 2019 | "Can You Feel the Love Tonight" | Beyoncé, Donald Glover, Seth Rogen & Billy Eichner | |
| July 22, 2019 | "Señorita" | Shawn Mendes & Camila Cabello | |
| July 29, 2019 | "Can You Feel the Love Tonight" | Beyoncé, Donald Glover, Seth Rogen & Billy Eichner | |
| August 5, 2019 | "Beautiful People" | Ed Sheeran feat. Khalid | |
| August 12, 2019 | "You Need to Calm Down" | Taylor Swift | |

== See also ==
- Billboard China
- Billboard China Top 100
