= Bubble (G.E.M. song) =

2012 single by G.E.M.

- Remix cover

Single by G.E.M.

from the album Xposed
- Language: Mandarin
- Released: 14 October 2012
- Recorded: 2012
- Genre: Pop
- Length: 4:18
- Label: Forward Music; Sony Music
- Songwriter(s): G.E.M.
- Producer(s): Lupo Groinig

G.E.M. singles chronology
"Miracle" (2012)	"Bubble" (2012)	"Blur" (2012)

Music video
- "Bubble" on YouTube

"Bubble" (Chinese: 泡沫; pinyin: Pào mò) is a song recorded by Hong Kong singer-songwriter G.E.M., taken from her third studio album, Xposed (2012). It was released as one of the singles from the album by Hummingbird Music on 14 October 2012. Written by G.E.M. and produced by Austrian songwriter Lupo Groinig, "Bubble" is a power ballad with lyrics exploring themes of love and heartbreak. The song compares relationships to bubbles, using them as a metaphor to illustrate both their beauty and their delicate yet fragile nature.

"Bubble" received critical acclaim from music critics, who praised the song's composition and G.E.M.'s vocal performance. The song surged in popularity after she performed it during season two of I Am a Singer in mainland China in January 2014. It has since garnered over 100 million streams on Xiami Music and over 70 million views on YouTube. The song's accolades include the Popularity Golden Song Award at the 2014 Migu Music Awards and the Popularity Search Award at the 2015 QQ Music Awards.

== Background and development ==
"Bubble"
A sample of "Bubble", which is a power ballad containing lyrics that liken the fragile nature of relationships to bubbles.

In an interview, G.E.M. said the song was written in 2011 after her breakup. She felt depressed and escaped to New York City to stay for a week. One day, she walked down a crowded street and saw some clowns blowing bubbles. It was a beautiful scene but in her eyes, although the bubbles were beautiful, they were also fragile.

== Critical reception ==
The song received acclaim from music critics. Radio DJ Zheng Yang noted that the appeal of the song's melody, while music professor Mr. Shanhe observed that G.E.M. demonstrated her full vocal range with ease and acknowledged her strong vocal performance.

== Music video ==
The music video for "Bubble" was directed by Tan Chang. The video was filmed in a single take, requiring the crew to dedicate an entire day to rehearsals beforehand. The shoot required precise coordination of lighting, camera work, bubbles, and G.E.M.'s movements. Producers who worked on the video commented that even the slightest misstep, such as turning the lights on too early, blowing the bubbles too late, or a minor deviation in G.E.M.'s actions, meant that the video and to be reshot.

To stay hidden as the camera moved, the on-set staff had to wear black clothing and remain concealed in the shadows. A particularly difficult scene to shoot involved scooping water from a shallow pool, catching a bubble, and keeping it intact on her hand.

== Live performances ==
With "Bubble" being one of G.E.M.'s most popular and acclaimed songs, she has performed it several times, including at the 13th Global Chinese Music Chart Awards Ceremony on October 5, 2013, in Kuala Lumpur. In January 2014, G.E.M. performed "Bubble" on the first episode of I Am a Singer (season 2), which led to a significant surge in the song's popularity in mainland China. On February 16, 2018, she performed it at the Spring in the East 2018 Dragon TV Spring Festival Gala in Shanghai.

== Accolades ==
Awards and nominations for "Bubble"
Organization	Year	Award	Result	Ref.
Global Chinese Pop Chart	2013	Top 20 Most Popular Songs of the Year	Won	
Migu Music Awards	2014	Popularity Golden Song Award	Won	
QQ Music Awards	2015	Peak Chart Popularity Search Award	Won	

== Track listing ==
- Digital download and streaming – Remix
1. "泡沫 (Pào Mò Remix)" – 4:59

== Release history ==
Release dates and formats
Region	Date	Format	Version	Label
Various	14 October 2012	Digital download; streaming	Original	Forward Music; Sony Music
Various	29 March 2016	Digital download; streaming	Remix	Forward Music; Sony Music
