= Joox Thailand Top 100 =

Thai music chart

The JOOX Thailand Top 100 is a weekly record chart published by JOOX Thailand, a music streaming service owned by Tencent. It ranks the most popular songs in Thailand based on the streaming activity of its app users and claims to be the only record chart in the country.

== See also ==
- JOOX Thailand Music Awards
