= City Zoo (song) =

2019 single by G.E.M.

Single by G.E.M.

from the album City Zoo
- Released: December 13, 2019
- Genre: Mandopop
- Length: 4:30
- Label: G Nation; Sony Music Taiwan
- Songwriter: G.E.M.
- Producers: Terrence Ma; G.E.M.

G.E.M. singles chronology
"Full Stop" (2019)	"City Zoo" (2019)	"Selfless" (2019)

Music video
- "City Zoo" on YouTube

City Zoo is a song by Hong Kong singer-songwriter G.E.M., released as the second single from her seventh studio album, City Zoo (2019). The song was written by G.E.M. and co-produced alongside Terrence Ma, with its official release taking place on December 13, 2019, through Sony Music Taiwan. From a musical perspective, "City Zoo" can be characterized as a Mandopop composition that incorporates retro-inspired sonic elements while maintaining a contemporary popular music framework. The song utilizes a combination of rhythmic instrumentation, stylized production techniques, and melodic vocal performance to establish its overall musical identity. From a lyrical standpoint, the composition employs a diverse range of animal-related imagery and symbolic metaphors as a narrative device for representing different categories of human behavior. Through these metaphorical representations, the lyrics explore various dimensions of contemporary urban society, illustrating how individuals display distinct characteristics and behavioral patterns within complex social environments. Collectively, these thematic elements contribute to the song's broader conceptual framework, in which the modern city is portrayed as a metaphorical zoo that reflects social interaction, individual identity, and the multifaceted nature of human society.

== Background and composition ==
"City Zoo" the album title track, which incorporates a large number of hip-hop arrangements, Describe the living postures of various animals, reflects social phenomena, and sneers at the dark side of how everyone may appear at some moment and hope that everyone can clear the temptation of false lies with the clearest vision and make the best choice.

== Music video ==
The music video for "City Zoo" was directed by OuterSpace Leo. The video was premiered on the listening session for the album "City Zoo" on December 13, 2019. The video is set in a computerized atmosphere and contains an interpolation of Michael Jackson's album art cover and several other art covers and movies. As of June 2020, the music video has gained over 11 million views.

== Release history ==
Release dates and formats
Region	Date	Format	Label
Various	December 13, 2019	Digital download; streaming	G Nation; Sony Music Taiwan
