= 2012 Jade Solid Gold Awards =

Hong Kong music awards ceremony

The 2012 Jade Solid Gold Best Ten Music Awards Presentation (Chinese: 2012年度十大勁歌金曲頒獎典禮) was held on January 13, 2013. It is part of the Jade Solid Gold Best Ten Music Awards Presentation series.

== Top 10 song awards ==
The top 10 songs (十大勁歌金曲) of 2012 are as follows.

Song name in Chinese	Artist
"What Have You Done"	G.E.M.
"重新長大"	Alfred Hui
"白頭到老"	Charlene Choi
"幼稚完"	Raymond Lam
"一首歌"	Terence Siufay
"牆紙"	Joey Yung
"預防針"	Linda Chung
"樹藤"	Mag Lam
"失戀哲理"	Jade Kwan
"留白"	Ivana Wong

== Additional awards ==
Award	Song (if available for award)	Recipient
The most popular group (最受歡迎組合獎)	-	(gold) RubberBand
-	-	(silver) C AllStar
-	-	(bronze) Sugar Club
The best newcomer artist (最受歡迎新人（男）獎)	-	(gold) Hubert Wu
-	-	(silver) Jay Fung
-	-	(bronze) Adason Lo
The best newcomer artist (最受歡迎新人（女）獎)	-	(gold) Sita Chan
-	-	(silver) Super Girls
-	-	(bronze) Rainky Wai
Outstanding Performance award (傑出表現獎)	-	(gold) Joyce Cheng
-	-	(silver) Hanjin Tan
-	-	(bronze) Gin Lee
Newcomer impact award (新人薦場飆星獎)	-	Fala Chen
The most popular commercial song (最受歡迎廣告歌曲獎)	"途經北海道"	Joey Yung
The most popular duet song (最受歡迎合唱歌曲獎)	"生命之花"	(gold) Louis Cheung & Ivana Wong
-	"追風箏的風箏"	(silver) Joey Yung & Mag Lam
-	"犯眾憎"	(bronze) Jason Chung & Karene Mak
Best Songwriter singer award (最受歡迎唱作歌星)	-	(gold) Endy Chow
-	-	(silver) G.E.M.
-	-	(bronze) RubberBand
Best Mandarin Song award (最受歡迎華語歌曲獎)	"霧裡看花"	(gold) Joey Yung
-	"戰利品"	(silver) Lollipop F
-	"頑石點頭"	(bronze) Raymond Lam
Best Revision Song Award (最受歡迎改編歌曲獎)	"面具"	Alfred Hui
The best compositions (最佳作曲)	"幼稚完"	Tang Chi Wai
The best lyrics (最佳填詞)	"頑石"	Albert Leung
The best music arrangement (最佳編曲)	"告別我的戀人們"	Chan Fai-young
The best song producer (最佳歌曲監製)	"預防針"	Johnny Yim
Asian Pacific most popular Hong Kong male artist (亞太區最受歡迎香港男歌星獎)	-	Lollipop F
Asian Pacific most popular Hong Kong female artist (亞太區最受歡迎香港女歌星獎)	-	Twins
The most popular male artist (最受歡迎男歌星)	-	Raymond Lam
The most popular female artist (最受歡迎女歌星)	-	Joey Yung
Gold song gold award (金曲金獎)	"留白"	Ivana Wong
