= Billboard China Top 100 =

Chinese music chart

The Billboard China logo

The Billboard China Top 100 (simplified Chinese: 中国公告牌音乐单曲榜; traditional Chinese: 中國公告牌音樂單曲榜) was the music industry standard record chart in China for local songs, compiled by Nielsen-CCData and published weekly by Billboard China. Chart rankings are based on digital sales, radio play, and online streaming in China.

The short-lived chart was last updated on September 6, 2019.

== List of number one songs ==
Issue date	Song	Artist	Ref.
January 4, 2019	"Ugly Beauty" (怪美的)	Jolin Tsai	
January 11, 2019	"People Like Me" (像我这样的人)	Mao Buyi	
January 17, 2019	"Get Rid of Blues" (消愁)	Mao Buyi	
January 25, 2019	"Let's Laugh Out Loud" (一起笑出来)	Jackie Chan & Cai Xukun	
February 1, 2019	"People Like Me" (像我这样的人)	Mao Buyi	
February 8, 2019	"People Like Me" (像我这样的人)	Mao Buyi	
February 15, 2019	"Get Rid of Blues" (消愁)	Mao Buyi	
February 22, 2019	"Half of it is Me" (一半是我)	Chen Linong	
March 1, 2019	"Half of it is Me" (一半是我)	Chen Linong	
March 8, 2019	"People Like Me" (像我这样的人)	Mao Buyi	
March 15, 2019	"People Like Me" (像我这样的人)	Mao Buyi	
March 22, 2019	"People Like Me" (像我这样的人)	Mao Buyi	
March 29, 2019	“Don’t You Know?” (知否知否)	Hu Xia & Yisa Yu	
April 5, 2019	“Don’t You Know?” (知否知否)	Hu Xia & Yisa Yu	
April 12, 2019	"People Like Me" (像我这样的人)	Mao Buyi	
April 19, 2019	"People Like Me" (像我这样的人)	Mao Buyi	
April 26, 2019	"People Like Me" (像我这样的人)	Mao Buyi	
May 3, 2019	"People Like Me" (像我这样的人)	Mao Buyi	
May 10, 2019	"Nature" (体会)	Lu Han	
May 17, 2019	"Nature" (体会)	Lu Han	
May 24, 2019	"Green" (绿色)	Shirley Chen	
May 31, 2019	"Green" (绿色)	Shirley Chen	
June 6, 2019	"Green" (绿色)	Shirley Chen	
June 14, 2019	"Big Bowl, Thick Noodle" (大碗宽面)	Kris Wu	
June 21, 2019	"Geng" (耿)	Silence Wang	
June 28, 2019	"Green" (绿色)	Shirley Chen	
July 5, 2019	"Puppet" (木偶人)	Joker Xue	
July 12, 2019	"Puppet" (木偶人)	Joker Xue	
July 19, 2019	"Puppet" (木偶人)	Joker Xue	
July 26, 2019	"Wa" (哇)	Li Yuchun	
August 2, 2019	"Eternal Love" (守护永恒的爱)	Stefanie Sun	
August 9, 2019	"Eternal Love" (守护永恒的爱)	Stefanie Sun	
August 16, 2019	"Miss Similar" (差不多姑娘)	G.E.M.	
August 23, 2019	"Space" (太空)	Wu Qing-feng	
August 30, 2019	"Space" (太空)	Wu Qing-feng	
September 6, 2019	"Space" (太空)	Wu Qing-feng	

== See also ==
- Billboard China
- Billboard China Airplay/FL
