= Billboard China =

Chinese Internet musical publication

- Billboard China logo
- Website type: Online magazine
- Available in: Chinese
- Owner: Vision Media Group
- Website: billboardchina.cn
- Commercial: Yes
- Registration: None
- Launched: September 5, 2016; 10 years ago
- Current status: Active

Billboard China (simplified Chinese: 中国公告牌; traditional Chinese: 中國公告牌) was a Chinese online music magazine founded by Vision Media Group on September 5, 2016. It served as the Chinese version of Billboard, also featuring independent coverage of both Chinese and international music content.

== Background ==
On May 28, 2015, Billboard launched Billboard Radio China, marking the debut of Asia's first internet radio station under the Billboard brand. After entering the Philippines and Thailand markets, Billboard formed another partnership with Chinese media company Vision Media Group in September 2016. The partnership resulted in several music content channels across platforms, including print, online, and mobile. Co-president of Billboard John Amato described: "This expansion into China is a milestone for Billboard." On December 29, 2016, Billboard China's website was officially launched.

On August 8, 2022, Billboard announced their return to Chinese music market, by relaunching their music charts.

== Charts ==
On October 3, 2016, Billboard Radio China rebranded their weekly top 10 Mandarin and top 10 Cantonese singles chart as the Top 10 Hero chart, maintaining separate lists for Mandarin and Cantonese songs. Charting period is from Monday to Sunday. Ranking is based on the mainstream radio charts in Chinese-speaking regions as well as online streams and digital sales, sources include Taiwan's KKBox, mainland China's Kugou Music, Weibo's Asia New Songs Chart, and YinYueTai's V Chart.

On April 21, 2017, Billboard China partnered with Nielsen-CCData and Sina Weibo to launch the Billboard China Weibo Music Chart. On January 7, 2018, the Billboard China Weibo Music Chart developed into the Billboard China Social Music Chart.

In January 2019, Billboard China announced the launch of the Billboard China Top 100, the Chinese equivalent to the US Billboard Hot 100.

In April 2019, the China Airplay/FL chart was launched. The chart measured the airplay of foreign language songs in China, based on audience impressions from a panel of radio stations compiled by Nielsen-CCData. It was active from April 29, 2019, to August 12, 2019.

- Billboard Radio China Top 10 Chart
- Billboard China Social Music Chart
- Billboard China Top 100
- Billboard China Airplay/FL
