= List of number-one albums in Hong Kong =

Hong Kong Record Merchants Association Limited (Chinese: 香港唱片商會) is a trade organization that represents record distributors and retailers in Hong Kong. It was founded on 3 September 1982. The association releases a weekly sales chart for "Best-selling Albums" and "Best-selling DVD/Blu-ray" titles. In recent years, the rankings are announced every Friday on the radio program Made in Hong Kong, which is aired on RTHK.

== List of number-one albums ==
=== 2025 ===
No.	Issue date	Album title	Artist(s)	Ref.
1	January 3	Interlude	Ian Chan	
2	January 10	EMO	Jay Fung	
3	January 17	Leon Lai 4CD Collection	Leon Lai	
4	January 24	Leon Lai 4CD Collection	Leon Lai	
6 (Note: No ranking for Week 5 dated January 31, 2025)	February 7	EMO	Jay Fung	
7	February 14	Touch of Absence	Cloud Wan	
8	February 21	Twins Spirit Since 2001 Live in Hong Kong	Twins	
9	February 28	Leap of Faith	Gin Lee	
10	March 7	Leap of Faith	Gin Lee	
11	March 14	Leap of Faith	Gin Lee	
12	March 21	Leap of Faith	Gin Lee	
13	March 28	Leap of Faith	Gin Lee	
14	April 4	Leap of Faith	Gin Lee	
15	April 11	Leap of Faith	Gin Lee	
16	April 18	Released (Splatter Vinyl LP)	Nicolas Tse	
17	April 25	Believe (Splatter Vinyl LP)	Nicolas Tse	
18	May 2	Kaho Live 2024	Kaho Hung	
19	May 9	Leap of Faith	Gin Lee	
20	May 16	Love, Sandy (Vinyl LP)	Sandy Lam	
21	May 23	Teresa Teng 4CD Collection	Teresa Teng	
22	May 30	Last Song for You OST	Various Artists	
23	June 6	Teresa Teng 4CD Collection	Teresa Teng	
24	June 13	Teresa Teng 4CD Collection	Teresa Teng	
25	June 20	Leap of Faith	Gin Lee	
26	June 27	nude	Mayao	
27	July 4	My Story Your Song	Tang Siu Hau	
28	July 11	My Story Your Song	Tang Siu Hau	
29	July 18	My Story Your Song	Tang Siu Hau	
30	July 25	Gratitude	Kelly Chen	
31	August 1	Sweet & Sour	MC Cheung	
32	August 8	Sweet & Sour	MC Cheung	
33	August 15	The Best of Kelly Chen	Kelly Chen	
34	August 22	e to E	Edan Lui	
35	August 29	Writer's Block	AGA	
36	September 5	Fear and Dreams	Eason Chan	
37	September 12	Fear and Dreams	Eason Chan	
38	September 19	Fear and Dreams	Eason Chan	
40 (Note: No ranking for Week 39 dated September 26, 2025)	October 3	Bloom	Pandora	
41	October 10	Fear and Dreams	Eason Chan	
42	October 17	Fear and Dreams	Eason Chan	
43	October 24	Bloom	Pandora	
44	October 31	Priscilla Chan Fantasy 40	Priscilla Chan	
45	November 7	Fear and Dreams	Eason Chan	
46	November 14	Fear and Dreams	Eason Chan	
47	November 21	Fear and Dreams	Eason Chan	
48	November 28	Kintsugi	Jer Lau	
49	December 5	Canvas	Kaho Hung	
50	December 12	Canvas	Kaho Hung	
51	December 19	Alan Tam In Concert '91	Alan Tam	
52	December 26	Time to Time/Later	On Chan	

=== 2024 ===
No.	Issue date	Album title	Artist(s)	Ref.
1	January 5	Juntos	RubberBand	
2	January 12	Juntos	RubberBand	
3	January 19	in Rhythm	Jason Chan	
4	January 26	We Are Twins	Twins	
5	February 2	We Are Twins	Twins	
6	February 9	We Are Twins	Twins	
7	February 16	We Are Twins	Twins	
8	February 23	Another Side...Joey · My Secret · Live	Joey Yung	
9	March 1	Another Side...Joey · My Secret · Live	Joey Yung	
10	March 8	Another Side...Joey · My Secret · Live	Joey Yung	
11	March 15	Life afteR Life	On Chan	
12	March 22	Treble	MC Cheung	
13	March 29	Treble	MC Cheung	
14	April 5	Introduction to Pain	Cloud Wan	
15	April 12	Introduction to Pain	Cloud Wan	
16	April 19	Introduction to Pain	Cloud Wan	
17	April 26	Light in Your Heart (念)	Panther Chan	
18	May 3	Light in Your Heart (念)	Panther Chan	
19	May 10	Final Encounter of the Legend	Leslie Cheung	
20	May 17	Final Encounter of the Legend	Leslie Cheung	
21	May 24	Final Encounter of the Legend	Leslie Cheung	
22	May 31	Final Encounter of the Legend	Leslie Cheung	
23	June 7	Final Encounter of the Legend	Leslie Cheung	
24	June 14	Final Encounter of the Legend	Leslie Cheung	
25	June 21	Onederful Live 2023	AGA	
26	June 28	The Original Music & Soundtrack of Blossoms Shanghai	Various Artists	
27	July 5	The Original Music & Soundtrack of Blossoms Shanghai	Various Artists	
28	July 12	ISFP	Terence Lam	
29	July 19	Sound of Mi	Sammi Cheng	
30	July 26	Sound of Mi	Sammi Cheng	
31	August 2	Sound of Mi	Sammi Cheng	
32	August 9	Sound of Mi	Sammi Cheng	
33	August 16	Healing	Connie Hau	
34	August 23	Healing	Connie Hau	
35	August 30	Healing	Connie Hau	
36	September 6	One Dance	Ansonbean	
37	September 13	Priscilla Chan in Concert	Priscilla Chan	
38	September 20	Priscilla Chan in Concert	Priscilla Chan	
39	September 27	Priscilla Chan in Concert	Priscilla Chan	
40	October 4	Priscilla Chan in Concert	Priscilla Chan	
41	October 11	Priscilla Chan in Concert	Priscilla Chan	
42	October 18	Priscilla Chan in Concert	Priscilla Chan	
43	October 25	Harlequin	Lady Gaga	
44	November 1	10+1	Lolly Talk	
45	November 8	To Whom It May Concern	Chow Yan-ting	
46	November 15	To Whom It May Concern	Chow Yan-ting	
47	November 22	To Whom It May Concern	Chow Yan-ting	
48	November 29	Vivian Chow 4CDs Collection	Vivian Chow	
49	December 6	Twins Spirit Since 2001 Live in Hong Kong	Twins	
50	December 13	Leslie Cheung '88 Live Concert	Leslie Cheung	
51	December 20	Project Reject	On Chan	
52	December 27	Camouflage (隱形色)	Terence Lam	

=== 2023 ===
No.	Issue date	Album title	Artist(s)	Ref.
1	January 6	Daughter	Janice Vidal	
2	January 13	Love & Loss	Jay Fung	
3	January 20	Uncle Jan Lamb 2023	Jan Lamb	
4	January 27	The Next 20 Hins Live in Hong Kong	Hins Cheung	
5	February 3	The Next 20 Hins Live in Hong Kong	Hins Cheung	
6	February 10	The Next 20 Hins Live in Hong Kong	Hins Cheung	
7	February 17	The Next 20 Hins Live in Hong Kong	Hins Cheung	
8	February 24	The Next 20 Hins Live in Hong Kong	Hins Cheung	
9	March 3	The Next 20 Hins Live in Hong Kong	Hins Cheung	
10	March 10	The Next 20 Hins Live in Hong Kong	Hins Cheung	
11	March 17	The Next 20 Hins Live in Hong Kong	Hins Cheung	
12	March 24	This is MC	MC Cheung	
13	March 31	The Next 20 Hins Live in Hong Kong	Hins Cheung	
14	April 7	Remembrance Leslie	Leslie Cheung	
15	April 14	Remembrance Leslie	Leslie Cheung	
16	April 21	Remembrance Leslie	Leslie Cheung	
17	April 28	Remembrance Leslie	Leslie Cheung	
18	May 5	Remembrance Leslie	Leslie Cheung	
19	May 12	Remembrance Leslie	Leslie Cheung	
20	May 19	大人的童話 (Adult Fairy Tales)	Hacken Lee	
21	May 26	大人的童話 (Adult Fairy Tales)	Hacken Lee	
22	June 2	大人的童話 (Adult Fairy Tales)	Hacken Lee	
23	June 9	Cleanse	Kaho Hung	
24	June 16	The Next 20 Hins Live in Hong Kong	Hins Cheung	
25	June 23	Summer Blues Live	Terence Lam	
26	June 30	懷顧：一個顧嘉煇的時代	Joseph Koo	
27	July 7	懷顧：一個顧嘉煇的時代	Joseph Koo	
28	July 14	Summer Blues Live	Terence Lam	
29	July 21	Dream	Sammi Cheng	
30	July 28	Dream	Sammi Cheng	
31	August 4	Dream	Sammi Cheng	
32	August 11	Ireallylovetosing	Leo Ku	
33	August 18	Ireallylovetosing	Leo Ku	
34	August 25	Hacken Lee X HK Phil Concert 2023	Hacken Lee	
35	September 1	Hacken Lee X HK Phil Concert 2023	Hacken Lee	
36	September 8	Hacken Lee X HK Phil Concert 2023	Hacken Lee	
37	September 15	The Poetess – 70th Anniversary Special	Teresa Teng	
38	September 22	Hacken Lee X HK Phil Concert 2023	Hacken Lee	
39	September 29	Leslie Final Collection	Leslie Cheung	
40	October 6	Christopher Wong Live 2022	Christopher Wong	
41	October 13	One	Chantel Yiu	
42	October 20	Just (無題)	Dave Wang	
43	October 27	Just (無題)	Dave Wang	
44	November 3	Chin Up!	Eason Chan	
45	November 10	Chin Up!	Eason Chan	
46	November 17	Chin Up!	Eason Chan	
47	November 24	Chin Up!	Eason Chan	
48	December 1	Chin Up!	Eason Chan	
49	December 8	Chin Up!	Eason Chan	
50	December 15	Chin Up!	Eason Chan	
51	December 22	Life afteR Life	On Chan	
52	December 29	0	Sandy Lam	

=== 2022 ===
No.	Issue date	Album title	Artist(s)	Ref.
1	January 7	A Classic Tour: Finale Hong Kong	Jacky Cheung	
2	January 14	Seven	Terence Lam	
3	January 21	Seven	Terence Lam	
4	January 28	Seven	Terence Lam	
5	February 4	Dark Light of the Soul	Vincy Chan	
6	February 11	Eyes on Me	Kayee Tam	
7	February 18	Eyes on Me	Kayee Tam	
8	February 25	Forever Young at Heart OST	Various Artists	
9	March 4	不同名	Sodagreen	
10	March 11	Anthropocene	C Allstar	
11	March 18	Anthropocene	C Allstar	
12	March 25	Forever Young at Heart OST	Various Artists	
13	April 1	Forever Young at Heart OST	Various Artists	(Note: No source is available, but a written list of the week's Top Ten ranking list is available here.)
14	April 8	紅	Leslie Cheung	(Note: No source is available, but a written list of the week's Top Ten ranking list is available here.)
15	April 15	紅	Leslie Cheung	
16	April 22	紅	Leslie Cheung	
17	April 29	痴心眼內藏	Danny Chan	
18	May 6	子曰	Chet Lam	
19	May 13	謝霆鋒精選	Nicolas Tse	
20	May 20	Come Away With Me (20th Anniversary)	Norah Jones	
21	May 27	Mike	Mike Tsang	
22	June 3	Mike	Mike Tsang	
23	June 10	Mike	Mike Tsang	
24	June 17	Learning Curve	Joey Hung	
25	June 24	Love Songs From Dreams	Justin Lo	
26	July 1	When the Sun Goes Dark	Endy Chow	
27	July 8	傾 ∙ 聽	Alan Tam	
28	July 15	傾 ∙ 聽	Alan Tam	
29	July 22	Time & Faith	Gin Lee	
30	July 29	Greatest Works of Art	Jay Chou	
31	August 5	Greatest Works of Art	Jay Chou	
32	August 12	Present	Jolie Chan	
33	August 19	Memento	Terence Lam	
34	August 26	Memento	Terence Lam	
35	September 2	Mama's Affair OST	Various Artists	
36	September 9	Mama's Affair OST	Various Artists	
37	September 16	Mama's Affair OST	Various Artists	
38	September 23	Mama's Affair OST	Various Artists	
39	September 30	Mama's Affair OST	Various Artists	
40	October 7	Momento	Terence Lam	
41	October 14	Revelation	G.E.M.	
42	October 21	Revelation	G.E.M.	
43	October 28	Revelation	G.E.M.	
44	November 4	一生懸命	Priscilla Chan	
45	November 11	一生懸命	Priscilla Chan	
46	November 18	Semicolon	One Promise	
47	November 25	TVB 55th Anniversary Album	Various Artists	
48	December 2	TVB 55th Anniversary Album	Various Artists	
49	December 9	一生懸命	Priscilla Chan	
50	December 16	一生懸命	Priscilla Chan	
51	December 23	一生懸命	Priscilla Chan	
52	December 30	Daughter	Janice Vidal	
