= Ukrainian Match Factory =

Ukrainian match manufacturer

Ukrainian Match Factory Ltd
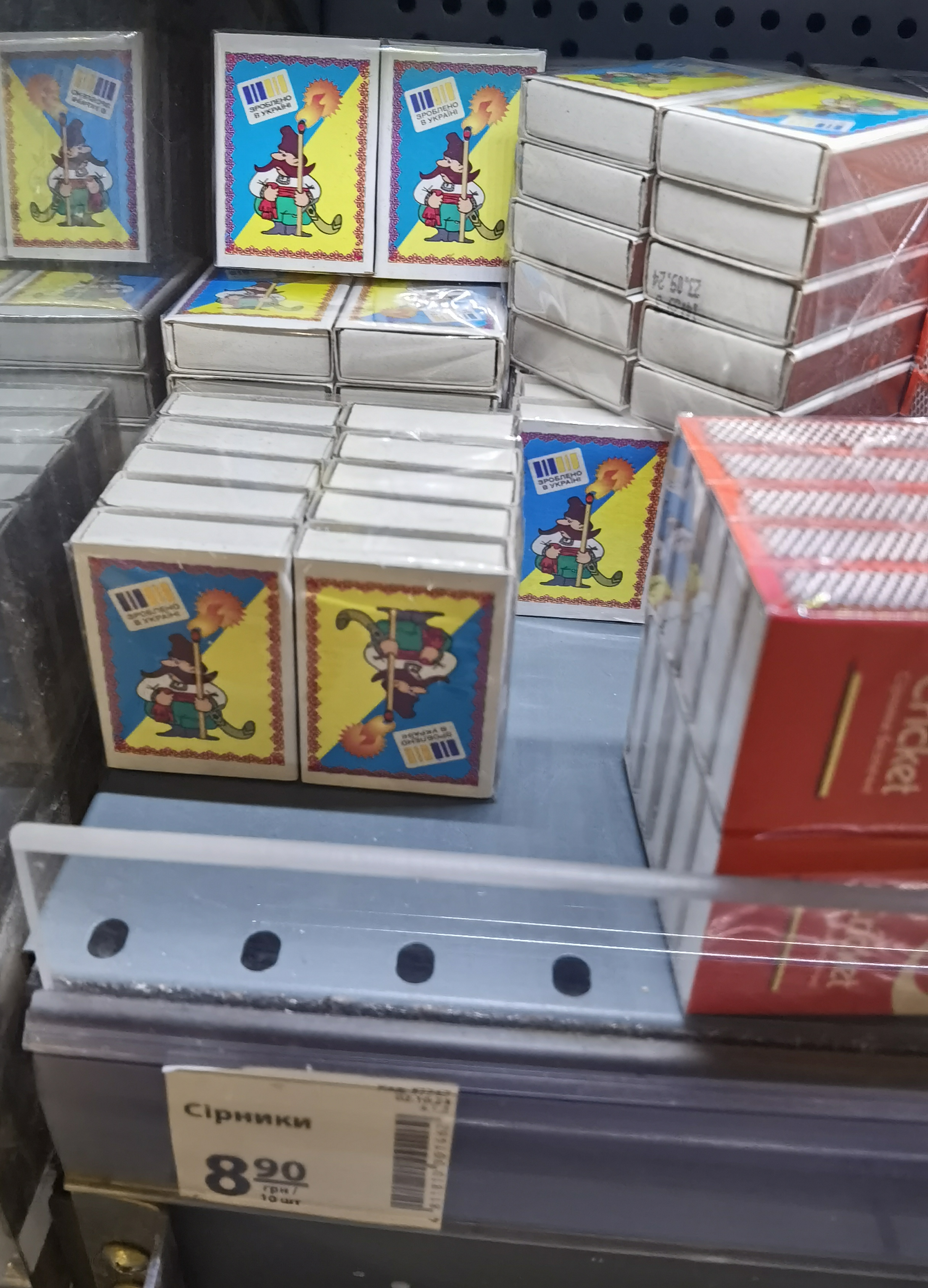
- Matches in a store, 27 November 2024
- Trade name: УСФ, USF
- Native name: ТзОВ Укранська Сірникова Фабрика
- Romanized name: TzOV Ukraiinska Sirnykova Fabryka
- Type: Private
- Industry: Advertising; Chemical; Publishing; Woodworking
- Predecessor: Rivne Match Factory
- Founded: 2004
- Headquarters: Berezne, Rivne Oblast, Ukraine
- Area served: Europe
- Products: Matches
- Production output: 630 million matchboxes (July 2025; 16 months ago)
- Brands: Ukrainian Matches
- Services: Exclusive matches; Print ad on matchbox
- Number of employees: 250 (2025)
- Website: ukrmatches.com

Ukrainian Match Factory (Ukrainian: Українська сірникова фабрика, УСФ, romanized: USF) is a Ukrainian manufacturer of matches and the country's top-selling match brand.

== History ==
=== Before 1921 ===
Matches were first produced in Ukraine in the middle of the 19th century. Many private manufacturers of matches were located throughout many regions of Ukraine, including Kyiv, Kharkiv, Poltava, Cherkasy, Chernihiv, Kherson, Crimea, and Volyn Oblasts.

Most of the private factories ceased to exist after World War I, the Communist revolution in Russia, and the Ukrainian War of Independence.

==== East Ukraine ====
Sometime in the 1830s or 1840s, the first phosphorus match manufacturing in Kharkiv was begun by Karl Viklas, a watchmaker originally from Lemberg (now Lviv). More advanced match manufacturing was done by pharmacist Fedor Ruprekht. From 1890 to 1894, there was also a match factory run by Boris Kroianovskyi with 25 workers. A match factory with 30 workers is also recorded as having been active in Romny in 1890.

==== South Ukraine ====
According to archival documents, the first mention of a private manufacturer of matches is in Odesa in 1861; it was closed after a few years of work. In 1870, the Rublev family launched their own match factory in Odesa for producing Swedish and English matches. Between 1870 and 1920, there were a number of other manufacturers, but active production of matches ceased in Odesa after 1920.

==== Central and North Ukraine ====
A 20-worker match manufacture was set up by A. Liberman in Kyiv in 1867. Over the next several decades, dozens of match manufacturers sprouted up in Kyiv and its suburbs.

Other production sites could be found at a number of sites, including Korostyshiv, Berdychiv, Radomyshl, Lysa Gora, Cherkasy, Kamianka, Poltava, and Kremenchuk. Lurye's match factory, located in Cherkasy, was of particular importance.

In 1914, the "Malorossia" match factory in Novozybkov (Chernigov Governorate at the time) released the first-ever matchbox with a portrait of Taras Shevchenko.

==== West Ukraine ====
In the late 1890s, there were three manufacturers in the western part of Ukraine: in Pulyny, Zhytomyr Oblast; Tunyky, Ternopil Oblast; and in Kostopil, Rivne Oblast. Aaron Margulis built his match factory in Kostopil. Margulis' factory produced some 635,000 safety matches in 1896 and is recorded as having employed 50 workers in 1897. In 1899, a match factory in Kostopil stopped production due to unknown reasons; also that year, the factory in Kremenets is recorded as having 25 workers employed.

In 1906 in Bila (a suburb of Rivne), a new factory was founded by Aaron Margulis and Itzka Zup, named the "Steam-powered Swedish Match Factory Volyn". In 1909, it had 70 workers and was producing matches at a rate of one million per year. In 1910, production doubled, and by 1911, the factory was employing 80 workers. In 1913, the factory was renamed the "Trading House of the Descendants of Margulis and Zup". Since the beginning of WWI, production started to decrease, and by 1922, the factory had ceased to exist. A few photos made at the production site in 1912–1917 by Shloyme Zanvl Rappoport preserve the memory of this de facto first match factory of Rivne.

=== 1921-1991 ===
From 1917 to 1926, the Soviets operated a state-owned factory called "Ukraine" in Kyiv. In 1922, a match factory was launched in Vinnytsia Oblast. During the occupation and integration of Ukrainian territory into the USSR in the 1920s and 1930s, most private manufacturers were nationalized or destroyed.

After the invasion of the Soviet Union in World War II, many of the production plants were destroyed or evacuated to deep Russian territory. In the post-WWII period there was some amount of match manufacturing in Odessa, according to collected matchboxes of that time, but there were no major match factories in Ukraine till the dissolution of the USSR, as most of the production of matches was centralized around Russian and Belarusian match factories.

=== Since 1991 ===
As of 1991, Ukraine imported most of its matches from Belarus and Russia, as well as some matches from the Baltic states and Poland.

In Ukraine, the Impuls chemical factory in Shostka produced only storm matches for outdoor activity during the Soviet era and continued production after 1991. However, these matches were expensive, and Ukrainian citizens continued to use safety matches imported from Russia, Belarus or elsewhere.

On 9 January 1991, the private company Gradient was founded as a match manufacturing company by a few enthusiastic ex-employees of the Yuzhnoe Design Bureau, but due to a lack of equipment it was decided to use bags of unsorted matches available cheaply from large match factories in Russia and Belarus, and repack them as large household matchboxes.

In early 1990s, Ukraine spent 20 million USD per year on importing matches. As a solution, the Ukrainian government planned to establish 3 match factories: in Rivne, Kyiv and Dnipro. In Dnipro it was planned to use Gradient as a base of one of such factories, but it was later decided to build only one factory, in Berezne, Rivne Oblast, on the base of an abandoned kinescope plant.

In 1997, Gradient converted itself into the Gradient-Plus LLC match factory in Dnipro. As it was able to accumulate some money selling repacks, the company's owners bought needed equipment, and started production of various matches themselves, mostly via manual assembly.

In 1998, the Ukrainian government established the state enterprise Rivne Match Factory (Ukrainian: Рівненська сірникова фабрика, РСФ), as the first domestic match manufacturer in Ukraine, mainly to reduce external interstate payments. Equipment was bought from Swedish Match's Arenco for the price of 17 million Deutschemarks. On 12 May 1999, the factory officially opened. Resources needed for manufacturing were supplied by other Ukrainian factories from different regions.

==== First Ukrainian Match ====
On 14 May 1999, the first fully domestically produced Ukrainian match was produced. These first matchboxes had a title in Ukrainian on backside — "the Ukrainian Match" (later changed to "Ukrainian Matches", "Safety Matches" and finally to simply "Matches").

After 2000, since mass production of basic matches had been started by the Rivne Match Factory, Gradient switched to producing limited-run series of souvenir and custom matches with ads on demand.

In 2004, the Ukrainian Match Factory LLC in Berezne was registered as a private company. According to the Ukrainian Match Factory official site, originally it was founded in 1995.

In 2007, both match factories in Berezne signed a mutual agreement of cooperation, with the Rivne Match Factory as a supplier of chemical parts for the Ukrainian Match Factory's needs.

During 2006–2013, Rivne Match Factory and Ukrainian Match Factory mutually filed several anti-dumping investigations against Russia's and Belarus' match manufactures. In 2012, the Ukrainian government decided to lift anti-dumping tariffs for all imported matches. In 2013, the Rivne Match Factory was proclaimed bankrupt by civil court, with all its equipment as state property, which since then has been leased for the Ukrainian Match Factory.

==== Russo-Ukrainian War ====
After Russia's 2014 invasion of Ukraine, sanctions were introduced against some products imported from Russia, but matches was not one such product. Since 2019, matches imported from Russia to Ukraine have been sanctioned.

On 29 May 2020, anti-dumping measures were introduced to protect the Ukrainian Match Factory's rights: a 21.32% tariff on all matches imported from Belarus and a 45.79% (initially proposed as 66.59%) tariff on matches imported from Russia, over a period of 5 years. A few months previously, Pinskdrev, one of the oldest match factories in Belarus and top match exporter to Ukraine, discontinued its match production line. Also in 2020, the Gradient-Plus factory, which survived only on the custom souvenir matches market, ceased its production.

In 2020, the Ukrainian Match Factory ceased production for a week due to a worker's COVID-19 incident, and then resumed only limited production. In 2021, full production was restored. That same year, a cooperation agreement was signed with Sri Kaliswari Colour Match Works in India to produce matches for the Ukrainian market. Matchboxes produced in India differ only in a single bottom line added to state production site on backside.

Since 24 February 2022, due to the Russian invasion of Ukraine, the Ukrainian government proclaimed martial law in Ukraine and called for blackout masking. Due to heavy Russian attacks on Ukrainian power plants and critical infrastructure, there were country wide uncontrolled power outages, resulting in daily shutdowns in all regions of Ukraine. This led to vastly increased use of candles and matches, and as a result the Ukrainian Matches Factory increased its production. Also, imports of goods from Belarus and Russia were almost totally sanctioned, including import of matches. These imports had sustained up to a third of the match market in Ukraine, with another third coming from India and Pakistan.

In 2024, the Ukrainian Match Factory joined the Ukrainian national cashback reward program Made in Ukraine. The same year, the company filed anti-dumping investigations against importers of matches from India and Pakistan.

In April 2025, anti-dumping measures were introduced to protect the Ukrainian Match Factory, with a 35.7% tariff on all Indian matches for a period of 5 years. On 18 July 2025, anti-dumping measures against Belarus' and Russia's matches import lifted due to the end of the 5-year period on those tariffs.

As of July 2025, the Ukrainian Match Factory uses 40 cubic metres of wood per day and produces 630 millions matchboxes per year. Production was ongoing 24/7 in 3 working shifts with around 250 workers in total.

Since 15 August 2025, 3 basic matchboxes per day are required to be included in the field rations of Ukrainian soldiers. (Earlier, it was permissible to include 6 storm matches or 1 basic matchbox, but not required; it was only required to include 10 storm matches in an emergency kit for aircrews and 10 storm matches per day for SOF and other military divers during special operations in a sea or on the coast). As of June 2025, there was around 200,000 Ukrainian soldiers in the field, which requires at least 600,000 matchboxes per day, or 219 million matchboxes per year — one third of the current production output of the Ukrainian Match Factory.

== Products ==
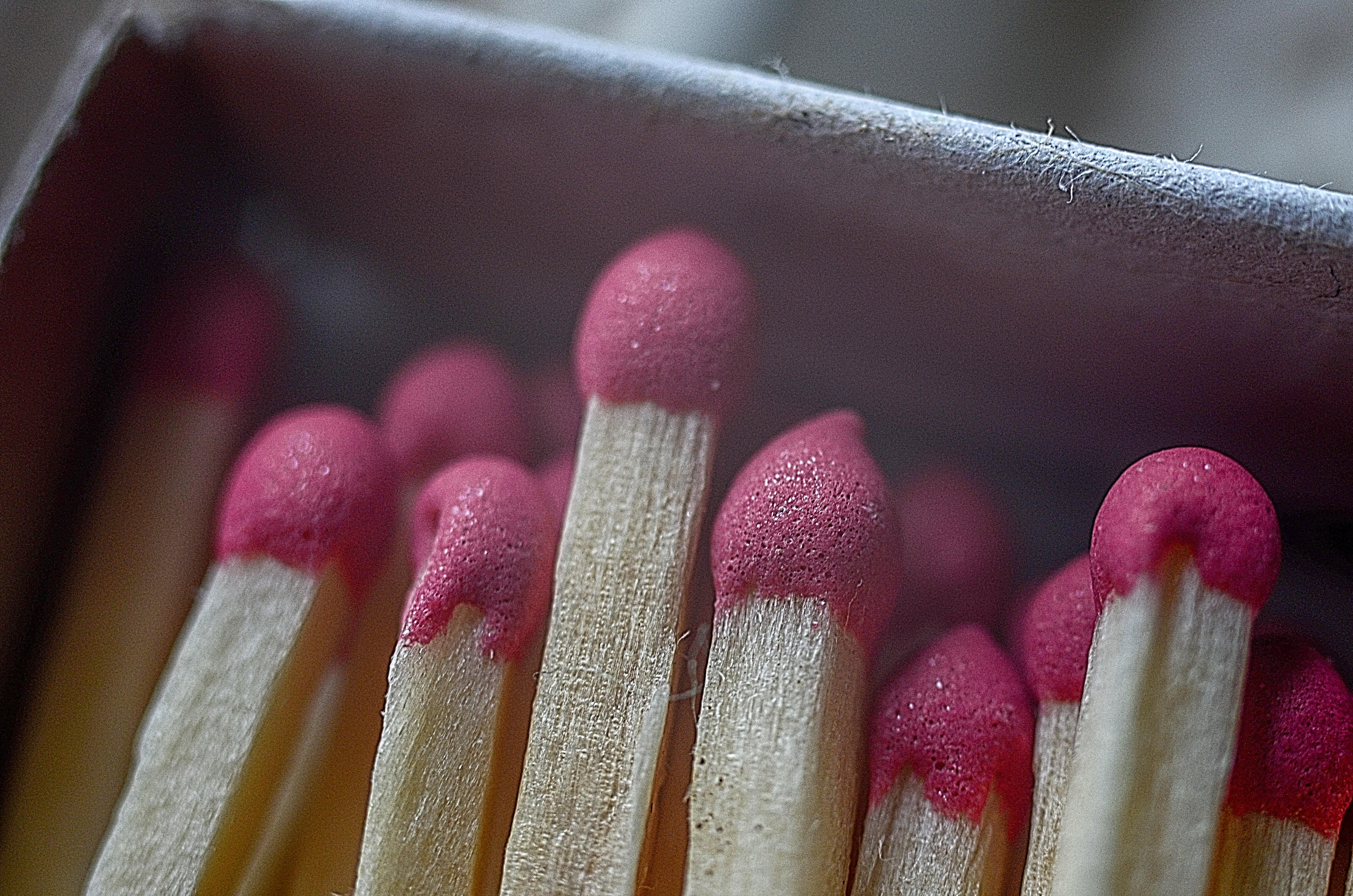
Ukrainian "red-heads" matchsticks

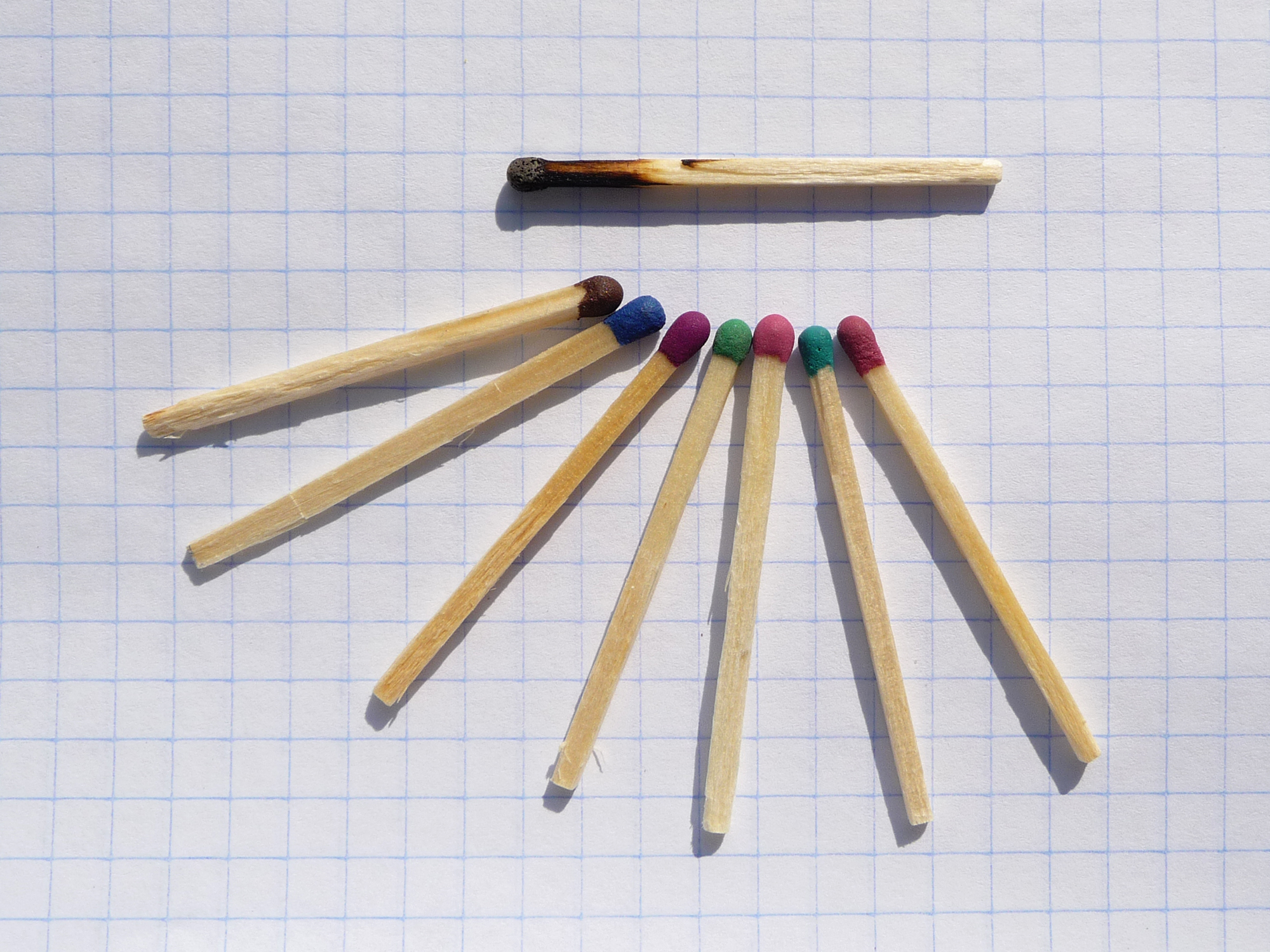
Matchstick palette in Ukraine (2010)

Since 2019, manufacturing has switched to use the Ukrainian standard ДСТУ EN 1783:2019, adopted from ISO 1783:1997.

Ukrainian Match Factory Products
Item	Box size	pcs/box	Matchstick/Note
Souvenir matchbook		10	flat, promo giftbox
Basic matchbox	51 mm × 36.3 mm × 11.8 mm	38	basic 43 mm match
Basic 10-box pack	2 × 1 × 5 basic boxes	10 basic boxes	basic 43 mm match
Household, 6th format	120 mm × 54 mm × 32 mm	500	basic 43 mm match
Household, 8th format	206 mm × 125 mm × 47.5 mm	2000	basic 43 mm match
Souvenir, 18 boxes	(3 × 6 × 1 basic boxes)	18 basic boxes	basic 43 mm match
Souvenir, 32 boxes	(4 × 8 × 1 basic boxes)	32 basic boxes	basic 43 mm match
For gas stove/barbecue	94 mm × 43.3 mm × 16.3 mm	30	long 83 mm match
For fireplace	160 mm × 53.5 mm × 12.5 mm	25	extra long 150 mm match
Windproof matches	101 × 37.5 × 12.5	10	long, increased coating
Fire flaming kit		100 grams	wood chips in packet
Paraffin candles (4 types)		from 1 to 6	4/5/6/10-hour candle

Products exported are to Armenia, Azerbaijan, Bulgaria, Moldova, Slovakia, Italy, Poland, Estonia, Latvia, Lithuania, Georgia, and Romania. For export, Ukrainian Match Factory localizes original matchboxes, but also produces matches for other brands, such as Zebra, Corrida, ZAPAŁKI, Almark, etc. (See: Collections)

=== Awards ===
- Best Taxpayer of Rivne Oblast (2021)
- Responsible Taxpayer of Rivne Oblast (2024)

== Design ==
=== Made in Ukraine ===
Since 1991, according to Ukrainian law, there is no requirement to stamp products with Made in Ukraine (like Made in USSR or Made in China), but some manufacturers stamped Made in Ukraine (or in Ukrainian: Зроблено в Україні) on their products for Ukrainian promotion and as a patriotic sign.

On the first match label of the Rivne Match Factory there was a tiny bottom line text saying Made in Ukraine in Ukrainian, but later it was removed, as the label background was in the style of the Flag of Ukraine, which is easy to recognize, and the Ukrainian Match Factory continued this practice.

The Made in Ukraine mark was revealed in 2016 as a stamp, and since 2024 in the form of permanent mark (See Ukrainian Match Factory Logo).

=== Label Series ===
==== Cossack Mamay ====
The first matchbox produced by the Rivne Match Factory has a label depicted the Ukrainian folklore hero Cossack Mamay in front of blue and yellow stripes in the form of the flag of Ukraine.

In 2009, Cossack Mamay was variant reintroduced in a Naïve art style, as a part of the 10th Anniversary of Ukrainian matches series.

In 2014, the Ukrainian Match Factory, celebrating its own 10th Anniversary, reintroduced Cossack Mamay, in the original style with small retouches, in different variants and different matchbox label orientations.

==== Rivne Match Factory Logo ====
The logo of the Rivne Match Factory appeared only on the back side of their first matchbox series. It was an abstract representation of a flower.

Latter logos was stylized to igniting matchstick with two leaves, and the final logo variant was an encircled anagram cp (from РСФ). The logo of the State Forestry Service was also printed side-by-side with it.

==== Cossack with a Match ====
After the Cossack Mamay series, Rivne Match Factory introduced a series with a generic old-man Ukrainian Cossack holding a large igniting match in his left hand and in his right hand holding smoking pipe with smoke drifting up. This series has changed orientation of the label from landscape to portrait and has as a background the flag of Ukraine angled left.

===== Ukrainian Match Factory Brand =====
Since 2004, the Cossack with a Match was adopted as a logo of the Ukrainian Match Factory, although small change introduced — smoke from pipe forming into the УСФ label (abbreviation from the Ukrainian: Українська Сірникова Фабрика).

Further changes triggered by anti-smoking campaigns in Ukraine removed the smoking pipe from the matchbox label, but the smoke-formed УСФ was kept. The factory logo itself wasn unchanged, but printed on the back side in a size so reduced it's hard to observe a pipe with the naked eye. This design become a default label for basic matchboxes, and both variants, with and without pipe, was patented in 2019 (See: Patent on the Match and Matchbox). In latter versions the УСФ label was removed, and replaced with the Made in Ukraine national trademark.

In 2007, the title text on the back side of matchboxes was changed from Rivne Match Factory to Ukrainian Match Factory. During co-production by Rivne Match Factory and Ukrainian Match Factory, there both factories logos were printed.

In 2011, a promo matchbook in the style of a basic matchbox, with a flipped flag on as the background backside, was used as a self-promotion of company exclusive match service.

In 2016, the Ukrainian Match Factory released a series with the Зроблено в Україні mark in the form of a stamp in the top left or bottom right corner of the match label. Also, there were variants with the flag of Europe in the same place in 2011 and 2016 as a mark of being Made in EU.

From 2021–2023, the background was the Ukrainian flag placed vertical (left-rotated), as a reaction to Belarus-made clones on the Ukrainian market (See sections: Clones, Internet meme).

Since 2024, the Made in Ukraine mark, the national trademark of Ukraine, has been printed on the label.

Some other updates also occurred over time:

- Cossack upscaled or downscaled with color changes, with extra white outlines, and with small changes in label border design.
- Cossack in various holidays costumes in a front of thematic backgrounds (e.g. New Year's Day).
- Cossack with other character or transport (e.g. Cossack on board a Chaika , Cossack and windmill).
- Cossack, vectorized and retouched, on household matchboxes, standing in a front of a Ukrainian hut on summer day, summer night, or winter night.
- For the Moldovan market, the Cossack was replaced with a similar looking Moldovan character in a front of the angled flag of Moldova. There was a variant of Moldovan character sitting on a hill in a front of the Ciobănuș River.

==== Red Carnation or Rose ====
A matchbox with a red carnation or rose flower on a black background label with a red backside is another common series.

==== Ukrainian Women ====
A happy young Ukrainian woman character on a summer day in a front of green field, is an alternative variant to the Cossack with a Match on household matchbox labels.

In 2011–2014, as part of the holiday series, there was a subseries for March 8 (International Women's Day), where a Ukrainian woman character appeared on basic matchbox labels, in some variants:

- alone with flowers;
- together with a mirrored Ukrainian woman;
- together with the Cossack with a match holding flowers;
- together with ma mirrored Ukrainian woman and one Cossack with a Match;
- together with the Cossack with a Match holding her in a raised hand.

In this subseries there were labels in landscape and portrait orientations, congratulation and greetings text, a flag on a background with flipped colours or mirrored horizontally or vertically (later, mirrored flags appeared only on Belarus-made clones).

==== Collectible ====
External images
- Souvenir matches
- Cossack with a Match, 18box set (cover)
- Cossack with a Match, 18box set (front)
- Cossack with a Match, 18box puzzle (back)
- Rivne Tourism Region, 18box set (cover)
- Rivne Tourism Region, 18box set (front)
- 7 Wonders of Ukraine, 18box puzzle (cover)
- 7 Wonders of Ukraine, 18box puzzle (back)

There are several collectible series of matchbox labels:

- Firefighting (warnings, equipment, transport, etc.);
- Ukrainian pisanka;
- Birds and animals of Ukraine;
- Animals, aquarium fish, cars, planes;
- Holidays.

Souvenir matches are produced as giftboxes with 18 or 32 basic matchboxes in a form of label series, sets or puzzles.

==== Advertisments ====
Various social ads, as well as commercial and political ads, are also printed on matchboxes.

As matchboxes are used in many houses in Ukraine, newspapers, including the Holos Ukrayiny, post subscription ads on matchboxes. For their subscribers, Holos Ukrayiny presented a large pack of Ukrainian matches.

=== Patent on the match and matchbox ===
In 2011, the Ukrainian Match Factory trademarked the Cossack with a Match. The original artwork was created by Rivne Match Factory, which, at the time of patent registration, was bankrupt.

In 2014, the Ukrainiana Match Factory become aware that the Cossack with a Match was patented earlier in Ukraine by a student of Lviv Polytechnic, so factory officials decided to buy out the patent rights. The same year, the Ukrainian Match Factory» became the holder of patents on basic matchsticks and matchboxes in Ukraine, and later patented its basic matchbox label design (See: Patents).

Since 2015, the Ukrainian parliament has enforced measures against patent trolls, including match importers patenting matches in Ukraine to avoid tariffs.

=== Clones ===
In the 1990s, the Ukrainian Impuls plant in Shostka produced storm matches of various designs, commonly with 10 pieces/box, as well as 30 pieces/box matchboxes. These had a label in with Cossack Oko, a character from the Ukrainian cartoon series Cossacks.

Since 2014, Russian and Belarusian matches have appeared on the Ukrainian market in designs very similar to Ukrainian matches, including Cossack characters.

The clones made by the Pinskdrev factory in Pinsk, Belarus, are almost identical to the original article:

- Ukrainian flag background, angled right, horizontally mirrored from original Ukrainian matchbox;
- selfdrawn Cossack characters with a match and smoking pipe — similar to Ukrainian matchbox labels;
- on the reverse, layout of marks, text and logo placement simulated Ukrainian matchbox.

Differences of clones made by Pinskdrev:

- Cossack figure occupies more than 1/2 of label field;
- many different variants of Cossack in the same 10 matchbox pack;
- additional side and bottom line text promoting lottery "Win a car!";
- barcode on front.

Russian clones are not trying to look exactly identical, instead imitating Ukrainian matches in colors and motifs, and using the Cossack Oko character. Remarkably, there is a subseries with a top line text saying "Ukrainian women." (Ukrainian: україночка).

In 2021, identical matchboxes appeared on the market, with an additional line mentioning as production site the Sri Kaliswari Colour Match Works in India. Ukrainian Match Factory officials confirmed this fact, explaining that some number of the original matches were produced in cooperation with an Indian match factory due to increased needs on the market.

Matchbox comparison

Ukrainian vs. Belarusian clone (without barcode)

Belarusian clone (with barcode)

== Cultural impact ==
Ukrainian matches are a common cultural touchpoint in Ukraine.

=== Source of fires and wildfires ===
Matches are often mentioned by the State Emergency Service of Ukraine as the source of wildfires, and on social ads messages like "Matches are not a kids' toy", "Keep away from kids", "Do not leave kids with matches alone", referring to kids playing with matches as the source of fires at home, are common. Such a warning was adopted and printed on matchbox labels and backsides and there are series of matchboxes in a red color with a warning and an emergency call number. The firefighting series of matchbox labels with social ads promoting firefighters is the largest series produced by the Ukrainian Match Factory.

=== Propaganda ===
Metaphorically, a matchstick is used in Ukrainian propaganda, anti-propaganda and by politicians and news media to describe the source of a domino effect.

=== Hobby ===
Matchstick model creation and phillumeny are popular cheap hobbies in Ukraine.

Match related hobbies are sometime promoted in Ukraine with the tagline "matches are the toy", in a contrast to the "matches are not a kids' toy" warning, mentioning that as a hobby it is much safer than burning matches for fun.

==== Sirnyk Day ====
Sirnyk Day is an unofficial holiday celebrated in Ukraine as the International Day of Matches (or International Matchstick Day, Match Day) on March 2 (in other sources, April 10). On this day many exhibits of matchstick models and phillumenic collections are organized to promote use of matches in hobby. It also used to promote fire safety.

==== Schwablyk Day ====
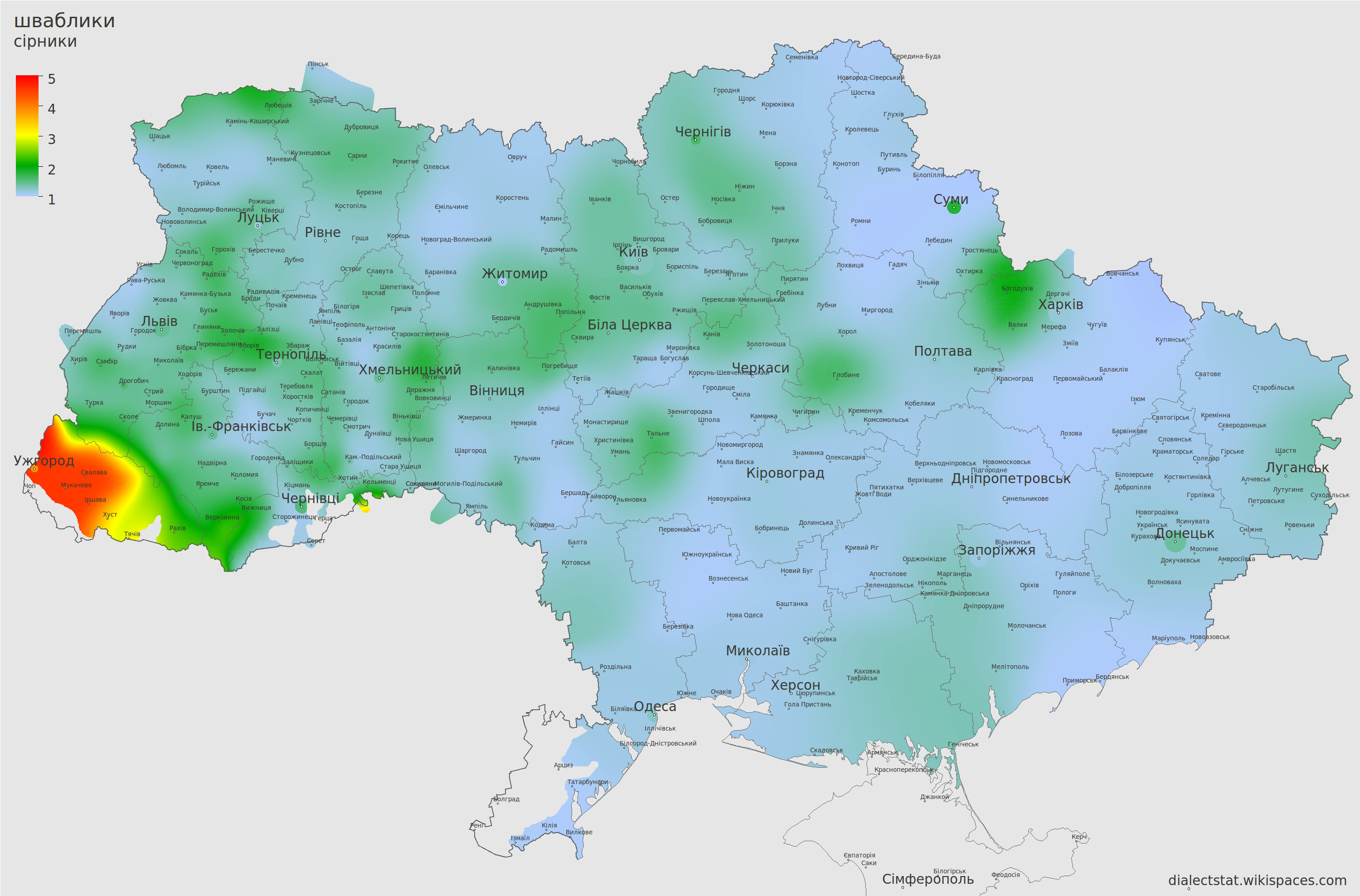
Map chart of "schwablyky" naming use

Day of Schwablyk is an unofficial holiday celebrated in western Ukraine, especially Uzhhorod, in April. "Schwablyky", a term in certain dialects for "matches" (in the plural), commonly used instead of "sirnyky" by Rusyns in Zakarpattia Oblast — the origin of the word is linked by some researchers to German Schwaben migrations.

In news media, the use of the word schwablyky was used to shame Ukrainian citizens unaware of many dialect words used in Ukraine:

Some says there are schwablyky in our house...

— УП.Життя, https://life.pravda.com.ua/culture/2019/02/21/235623/

=== Accumulation of matches ===
After the Holodomor, WWII, Cold War, and Chornobyl disaster, in Ukraine there is a culture of stocking up of buckwheat, medications, salt, sugar, and matchboxes at home to be prepared for an emergency or wartime. Sometime, it has become hoarding due to panics. Gifting food packs, included buckwheat, matches, salt, condensed milk, and other basic products was a form of political parties pseudo-social care and ad campaigns during elections since the late 1990s. Since 2014, after the Russia invasion and occupation of Crimea and parts of Ukraine's eastern regions, where most of the salt mines and chemical manufacturing were located, hoarding of salt and matches rose again. Another wave of accumulation happened as a result of the COVID-19 pandemic in Ukraine.

Since Autumn 2021, due to massive panics on social media, in part caused by Russian propaganda in a face of possible further Russia invasion of Ukraine, sales of matches, salt, buckwheat, bread, and other basic products in Ukrainian markets increased, fully selling out in some regions. As a result, the Ukrainian government tried to prevent panics and hysteria, promising on TV, news, and social media that there would be no invasion.

On 20 January 2022, the President of Ukraine published a video message to the public on Facebook:

All the citizens, especially elderly, needs to breathe out, to relief and do not run to the market for buckwheat and matches. All the news media, do not be a tool of mass hysteria.

(Ukrainian: Усім громадянам, особливо похилого віку, потрібно видихнути, заспокоїтися і не бігти за гречкою та сірниками. Усім ЗМІ, не бути засобами масової істерії.)

— Volodymyr Zelenskyy, A message to the public from the President of Ukraine, https://www.facebook.com/zelenskiy95/posts/2992307357686287

Since 24 February 2022, after start of further Russian invasion, prices rapidly increased due to speculation, and as a result of Russian missile attacks on Ukrainian food markets, panic buying of essential goods produced larger deficits, triggering others to over-buy goods, resulted in emptying stores. As a result, prices and availability of matches become an object of speculation.

=== Smoking promotion ===
In the 2000s, labels on Ukrainian matches often appeared in the form of cigarette box covers, which was a paid promotion by cigarette manufacturers. Such matchboxes also were gifted via promotion campaigns, and the logo of the Ukrainian Match Company, seen by most of Ukrainians, as well as the Cossack with a Match itself, is associated with smoking in Ukrainian culture. The Ukrainian government introduced anti-smoking measures, as well as many social initiatives preventing smoking and promoting health care, forcing a change to the design of Ukrainian matches themselves.

=== Daily care ===
Ukrainian matchstick were used as toothpicks and with a piece of cotton as an ear pick for a while, until cheap Chinese bamboo and plastic picks flooded the market in Ukraine.

=== Pocket case ===
Due to the durability of Ukrainian matchboxes, they are often used for storing various things at home, and as pocket case for fishing tools. Glued matchboxes are used as a cheaper alternative to wooden, plastic, and metal toolboxes.

A matchbox with salt for cooking is often used during outdoor activity in Ukraine.

==== Drug dealing ====
Ukrainian matchboxes are used by drug dealers in Ukraine, and often appear in police reports on media.

=== Scale ===
The Ukrainian basic matchbox is used as an item to scale things, and outlived the Ukrainian 5 kopiyok coin (the original price of the basic matchbox) as such. The matchstick scale is used for macrophotography in Ukraine.

In 2019, the Ukrainian Match Factory released a series with a ruler markings on a basic matchbox backside and overall length (51 mm).

Ukrainian 1 hryvnia coin, a price of a single basic matchbox in 2025, are also commonly used to indicate scale since 1992, and there are a few upscaled coin-like monuments in Ukraine.

Scale table (values rounded)
Item to indicate scale	Length/Width/Height	Diameter	Weight
Ukrainian basic matchbox	51 × 37 × 12 mm	—	
Ukrainian basic matchstick	43 × 2 × 2 mm	2 mm	
1 hryvnia (silver, since 2018)	19 × 19 × 2 mm	19 mm	3.3 g
1 hryvnia (gold, 1992–2018)	26 × 26 × 3 mm	26 mm	6.8 or 7.1 g
5 kopiyok (silver, 1992–2015)	24 × 24 × 2 mm	24 mm	4.3 g

==== Volume and Mass ====
The volume of a matchbox, as well as the mass of items necessary to fill one, are used in farming and householding for measuring chemical substances and crops in Ukraine.

==== Price Index ====
In 1999, price of a single basic matchbox was 5 kopiyok (1/20 of hryvnia, or 0.05 UAH). Matchboxes form of common exchange rate, similar to Big Mac Index, and are sometime used in small goods exchange operations. Also, the Matchbox Index has been more stable than the Hryvnia Index.

As of 2025, the price of a single basic matchbox is 1 hryvnia, while the price o a 10-box pack varied from 8 to 17 hryvnias.

In 26 years, the price of a matchbox in USD decreased by 10 times, from 27¢ to 2.5¢, but in UAH it raised by 20 times, while matchsticks per box decreased from 45 to 38.

Price by year (100 kopiyok = 1 hryvnia = 1 UAH)
Year	Matchbox price	pcs/box	Single coin necessary for purchase
1999	0.05 UAH	45	5 kopiyok
2008	0.10 UAH	42	10 kopiyok
2010	0.15 to 20. UAH	40	25 kopiyok
2013	0.20 to 0.45 UAH	38	25 kopiyok or 50 kopiyok
2014	0.50 UAH	38	50 kopiyok
2025	1 to 2 UAH	38	1 hryvnia or 2 hryvni

=== Monuments ===
On 24 September 2009, a performing arts sculpture titled "Matchstick, that Came to Life" (Ukrainian: «Сірник, що ожив») was installed in Kyiv. The monument is in the form of a burned matchstick, the size of a tree, with a new born green leaf on its top, symbolizing the rebirth of a matchstick into a tree. The monument was commemorated to ecological problems of Kyiv.

=== Army support ===
Since 2014, due to the degeneration of the Russo-Ukrainian War into trench warfare, the Ukrainian Army has started to use trench candles, and Ukrainians started volunteering with mass production of candles, delivered to the frontline with large amounts of matchboxes. Matchstick model making is also a popular hobby among retired Ukrainian soldiers.

Since 2022, matchboxes have been used in various campaigns as a part of art performances to collect donations for supporting Ukrainian soldiers. A Ukrainian scientist supported the Ukrainian Army with self-made storm matches produced from basic Ukrainian matches.

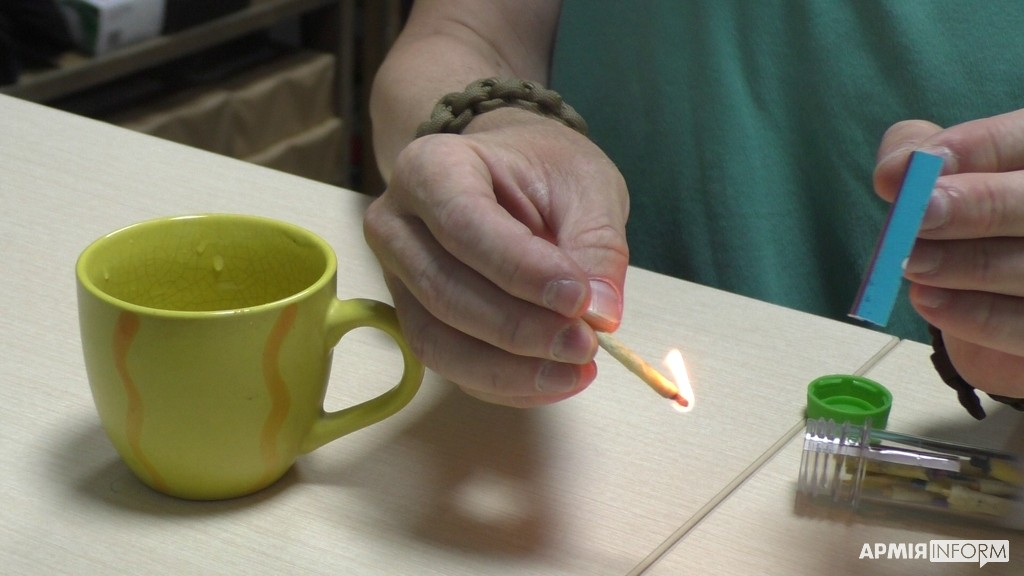
Ukrainian selfmade storm matches

Artworks

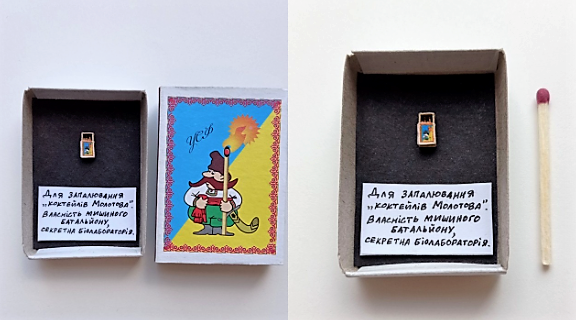
Miniature matchbox inside a matchbox

=== Internet meme ===
On 22 November 2024, after the release of S.T.A.L.K.E.R. 2: Heart of Chornobyl, Eurogamer's reviewer Brendan Caldwell mentioned a matchbox in the game as a "small glimpse of Ukrainian nationalism":

... small glimpses of Ukrainian nationalism do peek through - the flag's colours on a box of matches,...

— Brendan Caldwell, Stalker 2: Heart of Chornobyl review, eurogamer.net/stalker-2-heart-of-chornobyl-review

The in-game matchbox is a design with the blue and yellow stripes in the colors of the Ukrainian flag, as it appears on matchboxes of the Ukrainian Match Factory, but without the company logo (i.e. Cossack with a Match). The item in the game even looks copied from Belarus-made clones, where the matchbox label had mirrored background and a barcode stamp.

In a response, other game reviewers were opposed to Caldwell, noting it is strange and unfair to blame a Ukrainian-made game about Ukraine for the usual Ukrainian matchbox being used as a game item, while most American-made games, full of much more notable 'small glimpses' of American nationalism, are not criticized for placing a matchbox or lighter with American flags, because such items represents common real life items and matches with the national flags are common in many countries.

After the review was published online, Ukrainian matchboxes become a viral meme on social and news media. One meme depicts a matchbox with a Cossack dressed in the style of a stalker (a character archetype from the S.T.A.L.K.E.R. series), holding an energy drink and AK-47 rifle instead of a match.

External image
- Meme images on social media
- Matchbox in a style of S.T.A.L.K.E.R. 2 (@AnotherImrat on Twitter, 23 November 2024)

== See also ==
- Phillumeny (Collecting hobby)
- Artemsil (Ukrainian salt company)

== Publications ==
- СІРНИКОВА ФАБРИКА ОТРИМАЛА. ШВЕДСЬКЕ ОБЛАДНАННЯ. Свобода. 1998, No.108.
- Збанкрутувала єдина сірникова фабрика. Свобода. 2013, No.38.
- Омелянчук І. Тяжка доля українського сірника : [за матеріалами бесіди з комерц. дир. п-ва "Українська сірникова фабрика" Ларисою Михайлюковою] / Інна Омелянчук // Урядовий кур'єр. — 2008. — 9 жовт. — С. 8.
- Використання елементів геометрії до вирішення проблеми економії природних ресурсів / А.Ю. Іванцова // Новітні технології у науковій діяльності і навчальному процесі: Всеукраїнська науково-практична конференція студентів, аспірантів та мо- лодих учених (м. Чернігів, 16-17 квітня 2013 р.) : тези доповідей : в 2-х т. Т. 1. Технічні та економічні науки. – Чернігів : Черніг. держ. технол. ун-т, 2013. – С. 39. («У нашій роботі ми застосували елементи геометрії (зокрема, об'єм та площу) до розв’язання проблеми економії витратних матеріалів під час виготовлення упаковок вітчизняного виробника сірників ТОВ «Українська сірникова фабрика».»)
- Рачок П. На підприємствах району / П. Рачок // Надслучанський вісник : Громадсько-політична газета. - 2014. - N 68/23 верес./. - С. 1.
- Косарєв М. За високу якість українських сірників / Розмовляв Павло Рачок / М. Косарєв // Надслучанський вісник : Громадсько-політична газета. - 2014. - N 35/20 трав./. - С. 2.
- Говорять сірникові етикетки / Г. Маценко // Упаковка. - 2016. - No. 2. - С. 55–57. - Режим доступу: http://nbuv.gov.ua/UJRN/Upakovka_2016_2_21
- Березнівщина – перлина українського Полісся : краєзнавчий бібліографічний посібник, випуск 3 /матеріал підготували О.Гурин, С. Пономаренко.- Березне, 2014.
- Особливості класифікації сучасного асортименту сірників / Н.О. Машта // Сучасне матеріалознавство та товарознавство: теорія, практика, освіта: Матеріали VI Міжнародної науково-практичної інтернет-конференції (м. Полтава, 14 – 15 березня 2019 року). с.157-161.
- Оцінка якості сірників вітчизняного та закордонного виробництва / Л.М. Масюк, О.І. Примак, Н.О. Машта // І Міжнародна науково-практична інтернет-конференція (27-28 листопада 2018 року, м. Старобільськ, Україна).. с.173-176.
- Морозова М. М Проблеми порядку кодування та класифікації товарів з метою їх митного оформлення згідно УКТЗЕД / М. М. Морозова // Підприємництво, торгівля: теоретичні підходи та практичні аспекти : матеріали І Міжнар. наук.-практич. інтернет-конф. (м. Старобільськ, 27–28 листопада 2018 року). – Полтава : ПУЕТ, 2018. – С. 258–261. https://dspace.luguniv.edu.ua/xmlui/handle/123456789/4886
- https://science.lpnu.ua/sites/default/files/attachments/2024/feb/33847/zbirnykixmizhnarodnyymolodizhnyykongres28-29032024fin.pdf
- https://www.spfu.gov.ua/userfiles/pdf/10_20.pdf
- https://archive.od.gov.ua/wp-content/old-files/EL_ARH/R/daoo_perelik_r-fondiv.pdf
- https://phillumeny.info/wp-content/uploads/2020/11/Barmakov_v_g_uvlekatel_naya_filumeniya-1.pdf
- https://museumkiev.org/public/museology/museology2019/museology5-2019.pdf

=== Trademarks ===
- усф, уеф (color). URI: https://sis.nipo.gov.ua/uk/search/detail/1037647/
- усф, уеф (monochrome). URI: https://sis.nipo.gov.ua/uk/search/detail/1037648/

=== Patents ===
- Сірник (in Ukrainian) = Match and/or Matchstick : пат. 28476 Україна : 27–04. No. s201401276 ; заявл. 04.07.2014 ; опубл. 10.12.2014, Бюл. No. 23/2014. URI: https://sis.nipo.gov.ua/uk/search/detail/1293748/
- Коробок сірників (in Ukrainian) = Matchbox : пат. 28476 Україна : 09–03. No. s201401235 ; заявл. 01.07.2014 ; опубл. 25.11.2014, Бюл. No. 22/2014. URI: https://sis.nipo.gov.ua/uk/search/detail/1293789/
- Набір засобів для розпалювання вогню (in Ukrainian) = Fire flaming kit, basic matchbox : пат. 41215 Україна : 27–04. No. s201900798 ; заявл. 25.04.2019 ; опубл. 25.03.2020, Бюл. No. 6/2020. URI: https://sis.nipo.gov.ua/uk/search/detail/1352981/
- Набір засобів для розпалювання вогню (in Ukrainian) = Fire flaming kit, matchsticks pack : пат. 44394 Україна : 23–05. No. s202001041 ; заявл. 04.09.2020 ; опубл. 30.09.2021, Бюл. No. 39/2021. URI: https://sis.nipo.gov.ua/uk/search/detail/1444504/

=== Standards ===
«Ukrainian Match Factory» (Berezne)

- ДСТУ EN 1783:2019. Сірники. Вимоги до характеристик, безпека та класифікація (EN 1783:1997, IDT).
- ДСТУ ГОСТ 1820:2004. Сірники. Технічні умови (ГОСТ 1820–2001, IDT).
- ТУ У 02.2–32413704-004:2020.
- ТУ У 36.6-14314452-045:2011. Сірники для газу та ...
- ТУ У 36.6-32413704-001:2010. Сірники туристичні.
- ТУ У 36.6-14279336-003:2003. Свічки парафінові.

«Gradient-Plus» (Dnipro)

- ТУ У 36.6-01197973-001:2010 Сірники сувенірні.

«Impuls» plant (Shostka)

- ШТАК 773919.004 ТУ
- ТУ У 36.6-14314452-045:2011. Сірники туристичні.

«Fors», «INTVUS-Sh», «Lakt» (Shostka)

- ТУ 7513303–059–92

=== Collections ===
- https://museum.mcsc.gov.ua/authors/ukrainska-sirnikova-fabrika
- https://vasil-majk.wixsite.com/zapalna-ukraina/1999
- http://www.horeca.net.ua/matches.html
- https://matches.at.ua/photo/ukrajinski/5
- https://www.matchlabel.com/load/ukraina_usf/135
- https://www.matchlabel.com/photo/ukraina/804
- https://www.youtube.com/watch?v=fauRPtxV8a8
