= Matchbox (disambiguation) =

A matchbox is a box made of cardboard or thin wood designed to hold matches.

Matchbox may also refer to:

== Music ==
=== Bands ===
- Matchbox (Australian band), a jug band popular through the 1970s
- Matchbox (band), an English pop/rockabilly group, popular in the early 1980s

=== Songs ===
- "Matchbox" (song), a 1957 rock and roll song written and recorded by Carl Perkins
- "Matchbox", a song by English Indie band The Kooks from their first album, Inside In / Inside Out

== Film ==
- Matchbox (2002 film), Greek film
- Matchbox (2017 film), Malayalam film
- Matchbox: The Movie, 2026 American film based on the toy brand

== Other ==
- Antenna tuner, also known as a matchbox
- Matchbox (brand), well-known brand name of die-cast toys, originally sold in replica matchbox packaging
- Matchbox (window manager), window manager designed for embedded platforms
- Matchboxing or gutterboxing, the practice of displaying video with a distinct border around the edges of the screen
- Matchbox sign, psychiatric symptom seen in delusional parasitosis and Morgellons
- Matchbox (drinking game), game played using a matchbox
- MatchBox, name for the original prototype of the online dating app Tinder

== See also ==
- Matchbox Twenty, an American rock band formed in 1995
- "Matchbox Blues", a 1927 blues song by Blind Lemon Jefferson
- Matchbook (disambiguation)
- Matchstick (disambiguation)
