= Heil Zelensky =

- Starring: Valentin Vorobyov; Yulia Konyukhova; Yulia Mandriko; Igor Alekseev; Klim Thomson; Artyom Shcherba
- Production company: RT
- Release date: July 2023
- Running time: 1:02
- Country: Russia
- Language: German

Heil Zelensky is a Russian propaganda satirical video filmed in German and mocking Germany's assistance to Ukraine. The video was filmed with the participation of Russian actors and was distributed by Russian state media. The video was distributed as a social advertisement in July 2023 and was falsely positioned as filmed by the German party "Alternative for Germany".

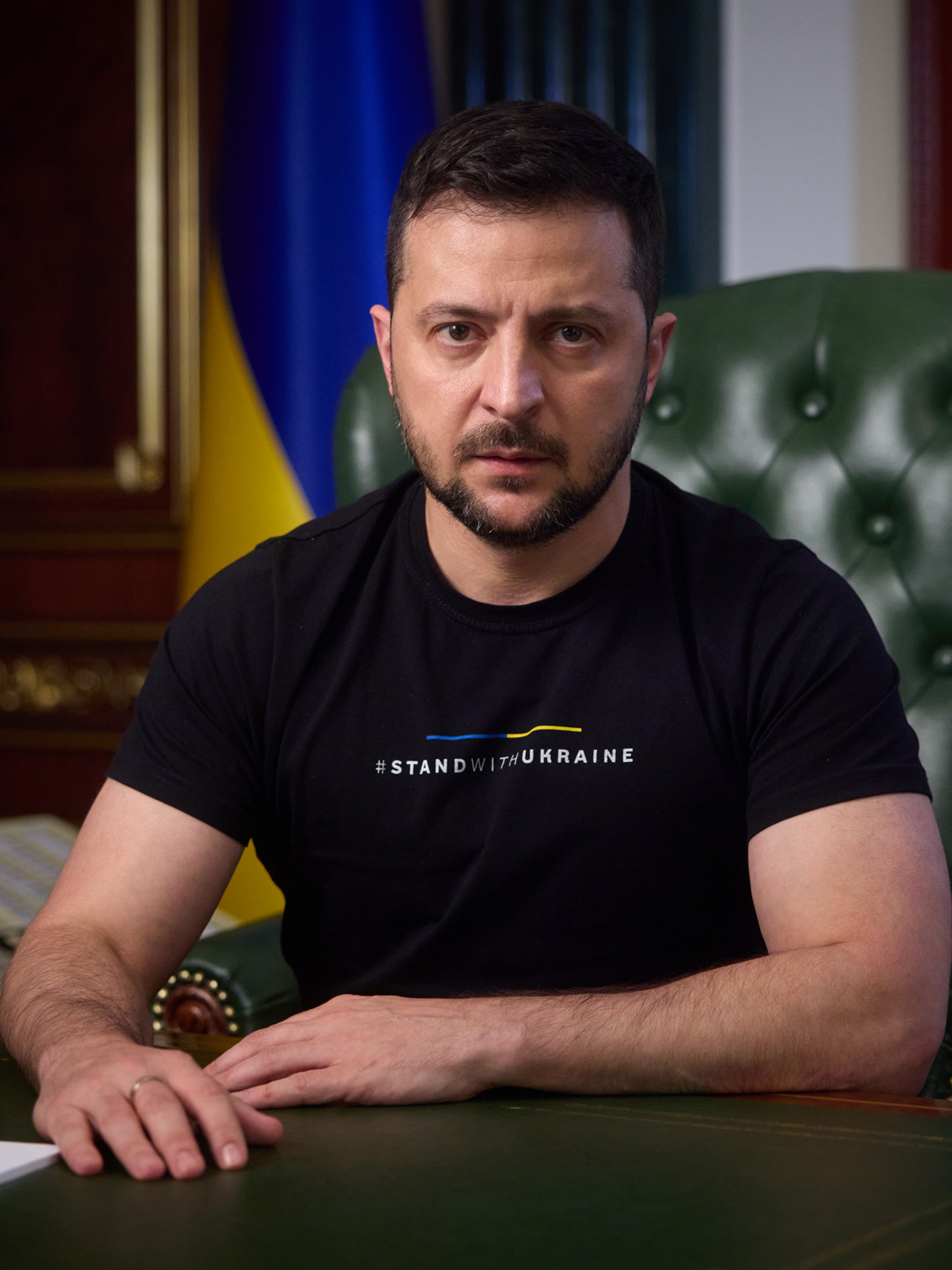
Portrait of President of Ukraine Volodymyr Zelenskyy, which appeared in the video

== Plot ==
At the beginning of the video, a German family is shown, a father, a mother, and a child. They are sitting on the couch watching TV, where an emotional speech by German Chancellor Olaf Scholz is being broadcast, urging people to help Ukraine, while the child is playing with a plush leopard at the same time.

Someone knocks on the door, and the child opens it. Four officials in military-style uniforms from an unnamed security agency enter. They begin collecting the property inside the house: items from the shelves, TV, money from the child's piggy bank, and they take the mother's gold earrings off her ears. Meanwhile, Scholz's speech continues on TV, where he says he will keep supporting Ukraine. The leader of the group that entered the house hangs a portrait of Ukrainian president Volodymyr Zelenskyy on the wall and says, “Heil Zelensky!” Almost nothing remains in the house afterward, except for the portrait of the Ukrainian president.

Then, in the credits, a comment appears on the screen in German: “Is your home in NATO? Get used to NATO in your home. 22 billion euros from the German budget have already been given to Ukraine since early 2022.”

After the credits, the woman in military uniform takes the toy leopard from the child, cheerfully saying, “Oh, a leopard!” and shouts “Heil Zelensky!” again.

== Video analysis ==
Fact-checking by Deutsche Welle and Provereno.Media revealed that the photograph shown at the beginning of the video with the caption “Germany, 2023” was actually taken in 2017 in the municipality of Rhodt unter Rietburg, Rhineland-Palatinate. The image had been published by the photo agency Alamy and was credited to photographer Hans Peter Merten. In the document held by the female official, the surname “Zelensky” is spelled as “Zelensky” rather than “Selenskij,” which is the standard German transliteration of the Ukrainian president's surname. The uniform described in the video as a “NATO soldier uniform” is, in fact, Bundeswehr attire. The German couple's child is playing with a plush leopard, alluding to the German “Leopard 2” tanks supplied to Ukraine. Deutsche Welle notes that although the amount of German aid to Ukraine corresponds to official data, the video misleadingly presents it as if it were given personally to Zelenskyy.

== Actors ==
According to reporting by Radio Free Europe/Radio Liberty journalist Mark Krutov, Provereno.Media founder Ilya Ber, and the investigative outlet Agentstvo, with additional details from the Belarusian newspaper Nasha Niva, the video “Heil Zelensky” featured the following Russian actors:

- Valentin Vorobyov as father
- Yulia Konyukhova as mother
- Yulia Mandriko as head of the officials
- Igor Alekseev, Klim Thomson, Artyom Shcherba as officials

The actors’ identities were established through facial recognition analysis and were publicly disclosed on 26 July 2023.

On her Instagram page, Yulia Konyukhova posted a behind-the-scenes video and stated in the description that the production was filmed by the Russian state broadcaster RT, also noting that the child in the German family was played by her son, Svyatoslav. The post was later deleted. When contacted by RFE/RL, Konyukhova claimed that she didn't have an Instagram account; she told Agentstvo that she couldn't speak to journalists due to contractual restrictions, and in a comment to the online outlet Daily Storm she stated that she hadn't appeared in the video. Yulia Mandriko didn't respond to messages from journalists on social media.

== Reactions ==
=== Russia ===
The video was widely distributed by Russian state media, pro-government Telegram channels, war correspondents, and bloggers. For example, Armen Gasparyan, a member of the Civic Chamber of the Russian Federation, shared the recording. In most publications, it was claimed that the video had been produced by the German right-wing party Alternative for Germany (AfD). For instance, Channel One host Ruslan Ostashko asserted that the creators of the video were AfD members. The Daily Telegraph described the assertion by Russian sources that the ad was produced by AfD as “falsely”. Other commentators used vague formulations when referring to the supposed origin of the video. War correspondent Aleksandr Kots called the clip “an excellent shell in the information war” and said it was aimed at “ordinary citizens of Germany.” The state news agency RIA Novosti described the video as “a German-language humorous clip criticizing Berlin’s spending on aid to the Ukrainian Armed Forces.” Argumenty i Fakty reported that it was “German social advertising,” while Tsargrad TV referred to it as “political advertising from Germany.” RT Russian published the video without crediting any authors; according to its Telegram channel, the clip depicts “Germans whose NATO soldiers take everything in order to help Ukraine,” forcing them to salute Zelenskyy in a way reminiscent of Nazi Germany.

Journalist Ilya Ber noted that the video featured Russian actors and called it “another Russian propaganda fake.” According to Ber, the video first appeared in the German and Dutch segments of Twitter. Mark Krutov from Radio Free Europe/Radio Liberty observed that the content and structure of the video bore strong similarities to earlier examples of pro-Kremlin propaganda, such as a 2018 clip featuring actor Sergey Burunov created ahead of the Russian presidential election.

=== Germany ===
The video wasn't published on the website or social media accounts of Alternative for Germany (AfD), and the party itself is not mentioned in the clip. In response to an inquiry from Deutsche Welle, the AfD press office denied producing the video and stated that they had learned about its existence only from DW's request. The video circulated widely across nearly all active pro-Russian channels targeting Russian-speaking residents of Germany.

German historian, publicist, and expert on military propaganda, warfare, and media manipulation Christian Hardinghaus argued that the video was likely produced by Russian propaganda and resembled the satirical style of ZDF’s “Browser Ballett.” Lea Frühwirth, a psychologist from the Center for Monitoring, Analysis and Strategy, noted that the video relies on motifs typical of Russian propaganda: portraying Ukraine as a neo-Nazi regime and suggesting that Germany’s support for Ukraine endangers German citizens. European Center for Human Rights Dialogue, which is financed by Federal Foreign Office, described the video as a “fake provocative clip.” Deutsche Welle also pointed out that the plot of the video mirrors a fake cover of the satirical magazine Titanic, depicting Volodymyr Zelenskyy with an exaggeratedly large open mouth, which — like the “Heil Zelensky” clip — fits into the narrative that Ukraine is constantly demanding more aid from Europe. The newspaper Süddeutsche Zeitung argued that the video does not align with actual knowledge of German realities and language. The article also noted that anti-German propaganda in Russia often takes the form of “amusing” examples, such as depictions of “frozen” Germans and TV host Vladimir Solovyov’s exaggerated “growling” pronunciation of German names.
