= Social advertising =

Social advertising can refer to:

- Social advertising (social relationships), advertising using the social environment to reach its target audience
- Social advertising (social issues), advertising about social issues
