= Go-to-bed matchbox =

19th-century match container

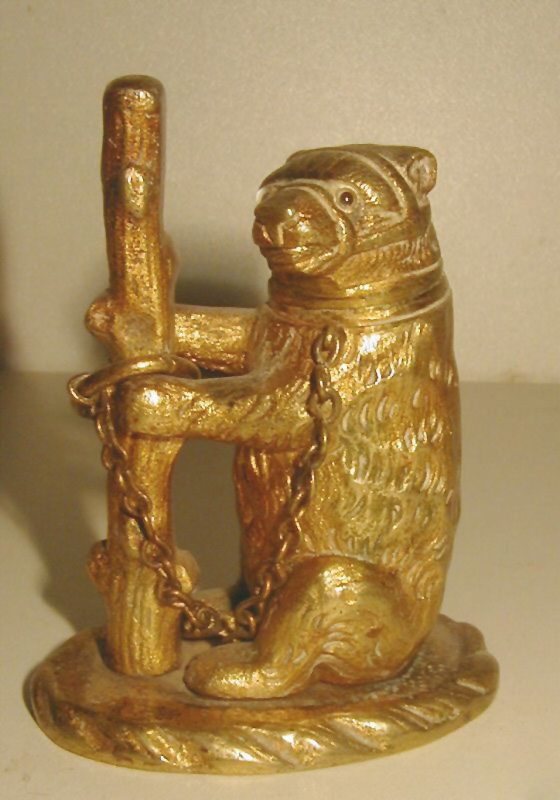
A brass go-to-bed bear. The hinged head allows access to the matches stored in the body; the lit match is placed in the hole at the end of the staff

Go-to-bed or getting-into-bed matchboxes were a variety of match storage box popular in the mid-to-late 19th century. Relatively small, about 6 cm high, they were frequently made of metal of some kind, though sometimes of wood or ivory.

Most incorporated a rough surface on which the match could be struck. All featured a small hole or finial, sometimes in ivory and always part of the design, into which the lit match could be placed, rather like a miniature candle. The idea was that, rather than risk taking a lit candle near to the voluminous fabric of a four poster bed, the lit match on the mantelpiece would burn for some 30 seconds — just long enough for the person to snuff out the candle and get into bed.

== Designs ==
There is a huge variety in the designs of the matchboxes. Some were relatively simple boxes or cylindrical containers, some were barrel-shaped and made of wood or metal, while others were cast metal figures in a wide variety of designs. Private collections include castle towers, a Napoleonic soldier of the Second Empire, a Gothic knight holding a torch, a little boy selling newspapers, a bear and ragged staff, and so on. Other designs feature flower sellers and exotic ladies with a separate 'basket' in which the matches were stored.

One specific variety of go-to-bed is "Prince Albert's Safety Vesta Box". This was a decorated brass tub with an embossed top. Ribbed under the base for striking matches, it had a small finial to take a single match on top, and was marked "Prince Albert's Safety Box, 150 Patent Vesta Lights".

== See also ==
- Matchbox - disposable match containers.
- Phillumeny - the collecting of match related items.
