= Matchstick (disambiguation) =

A matchstick is a slender piece of flammable wood used as a match.

Matchstick may also refer to:

- Matchstick Banksia or Banksia cuneata, a flowering plant
- Matchstick girl, a variant name of the fictional character "The Little Match Girl"
- Matchstick graph, a type of geometric graph
- Matchstick Men, a 2003 American film
- Matchstick model, a style of scale models
- Matchstick Palace, historic building in Sweden
- Matchstick Productions, an American film production company
- Matchstick Sun, rock music group
- Matchstick TV, a brand of digital media player
