= Made in Ukraine =

National trademark of Ukraine

«Made in Ukraine» trademark label

Made in Ukraine (or in Ukrainian: Зроблено в Україні) is the national trademark of Ukraine.

== History ==
During Soviet period, products produced in Ukraine was marked either with «Made in USSR» or «Made in UkrSSR» label.

Since 1991, in independent Ukraine there are no official requirements to mark products made in Ukraine with the «Made in Ukraine» label, but some manufacturers marked own products with a such text label (in Ukrainian or English) as a promo of Ukraine or a patriotic sign (e.g. the Ukrainian radio receivers «Meridian» was marked with «Made in Ukraine» text label on its case back side). Alternatively, Ukrainian manufacturers placed small emblem in a form of the Flag of Ukraine on product or provided product or its logo in colors of the Ukrainian Flag (i.e. in Blue and Yellow colors, similar to Sweden products).

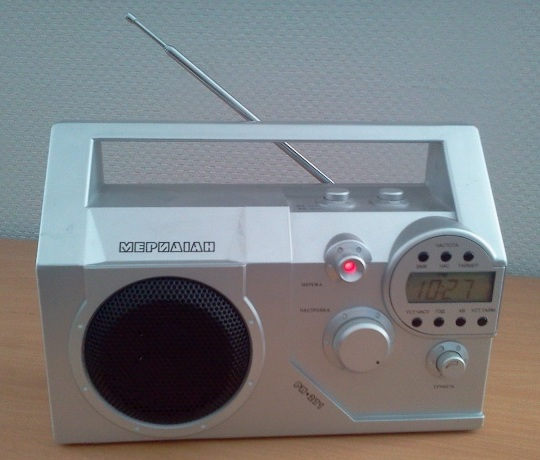
Meridian RP-271 radio receiver

Valentina (software) logo

During 1990s—2010s, there was number of governmental economic and social campaigns used the «Made in Ukraine» slogan.

=== National trademark ===
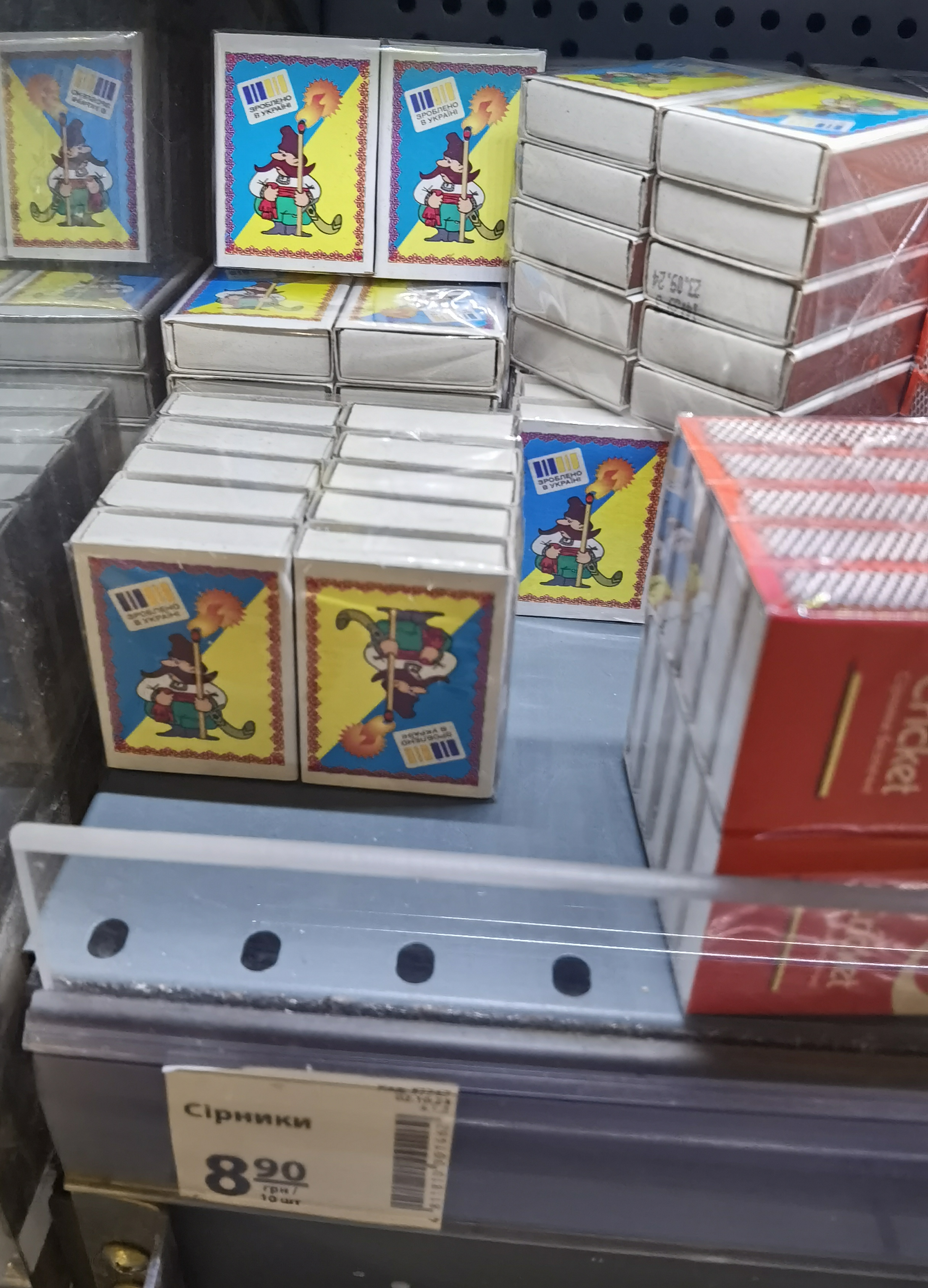
Ukrainian matches on the shelf (2024)

In January 2024, the President of Ukraine announced launch of the «Made in Ukraine» campaign.

In February 2024, the Ukrainian Government registered the national trademark «Made in Ukraine».

Products produced in Ukraine are eligible to be marked with a special graphic label of the national trademark, so manufacturers could voluntary add such label on own products using freely available mediakit.

For manufacturers officially joined the «Made in Ukraine» campaign there is additional state support program provided via local offices and the «National cashback» program curated by the Ministry of Economy.

Ukraine location on map of Europe

== Product quality certification ==
Until 2017, in Ukraine there was a list of domestically produced or imported products which quality required to be certified by the Ukrainian state certification center UkrSEPRO (Ukrainian: УкрСЕПРО), were certified products allowed to be marked with a special UkrSEPRO label to confirm product quality.

UkrSEPRO labels

Required certification sign

Voluntary certification sign

All radio communication electronic devices in Ukraine are required to be certified by the Ukrainian Center of Radio Frequencies (UCRF), were certified devices required to be marked with a special UCRF label.

== See also ==
- Country of origin
- International Article Number (Ukraine's EAN barcode first digits are 482)
- Brave1
- Ukraine NOW
- Ukraine WOW
- United24
