= Joshua Pusey =

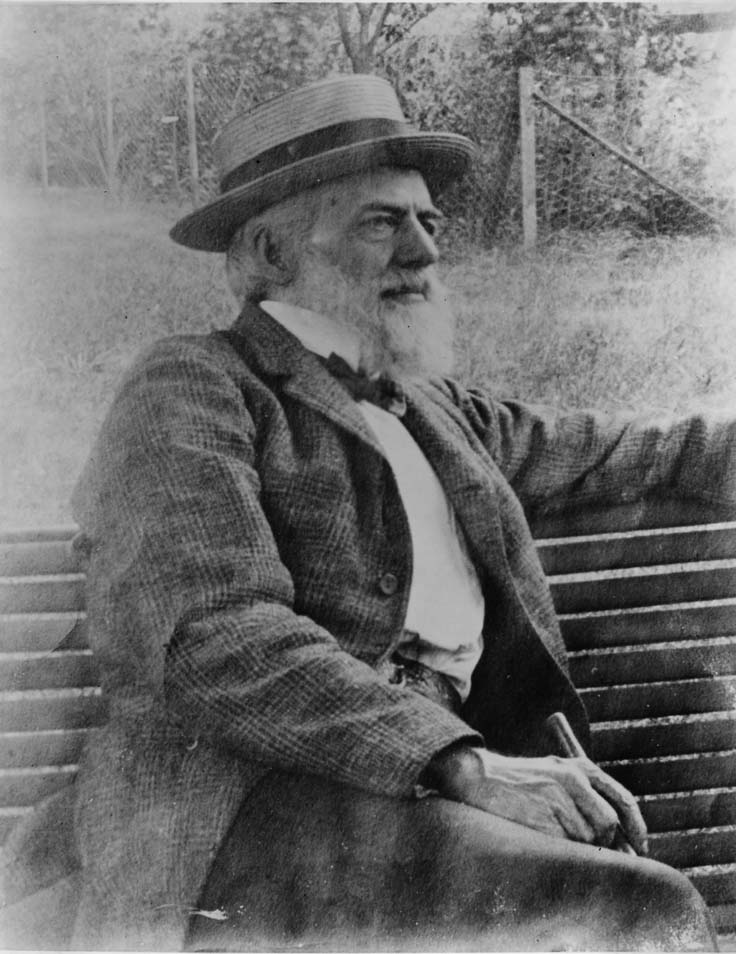
Joshua Pusey c. 1895

Joshua Pusey (March 27, 1842 - May 8, 1906 (?)), was an American inventor and an attorney.

In 1827, an English pharmacist named John Walker produced his "sulphuretted peroxide strikables," gigantic, yard-long sticks that can be considered the real precursor of today's match. Small phosphorus matches were first marketed in Germany in 1832, but they were extremely hazardous. In 1836 in the United States, Alonzo D. Phillips of Springfield, Massachusetts, obtained a patent for "manufacturing of friction matches" and called them locofocos crazies. The danger problem was not resolved until the invention of amorphous (red) phosphorus in 1845. Carl Lundstrom of Sweden introduced the first red phosphorus "safety" matches in 1855. These types of matches were large and had to be carried in a wooden box, and Pusey didn't like the bulkiness of this. He decided to make matches in a paper book that was easier to carry. In 1889 he finished and had created strike-able book matches.

Pusey was a Pennsylvanian attorney who was fond of smoking cigars. Fed up with carrying bulky boxes of wooden matches, he set to work to invent paper matches that would be lighter and smaller. His final design had matches secured to a thin paper wrapping with an attached striking surface. Unlike present-day matchbooks, Pusey positioned the striking surface on the inside of the paper fold. This allowed all 50 matches to be lit at once. The Diamond Match Company later put the striking surface on the outside.

He received a patent for his invention of the paper matchbook (which he called "flexibles") in 1889, but the idea did not catch on right away. Eight years later, in 1897, the Mendelssohn Opera Company distributed matchbooks with their logo emblazoned on them to advertise their New York City opening. After this promotion, demand for paper matchbooks soared.

Pusey later sold the invention to the Diamond Match Company for $4000 in 1896.
