= Matchbook (disambiguation) =

A matchbook is a small paperboard folder enclosing a quantity of matches and having a coarse striking surface on the exterior.

Matchbook may also refer to:

- Matchbook (Ralph Towner & Gary Burton album), 1974
- Matchbook (Ian Moss album), 1989
- Matchbook FX, an internet-based electronic communication network
- Matchbook Romance, rock music group
