= Matchbook =

Paperboard folder enclosing a quantity of matches

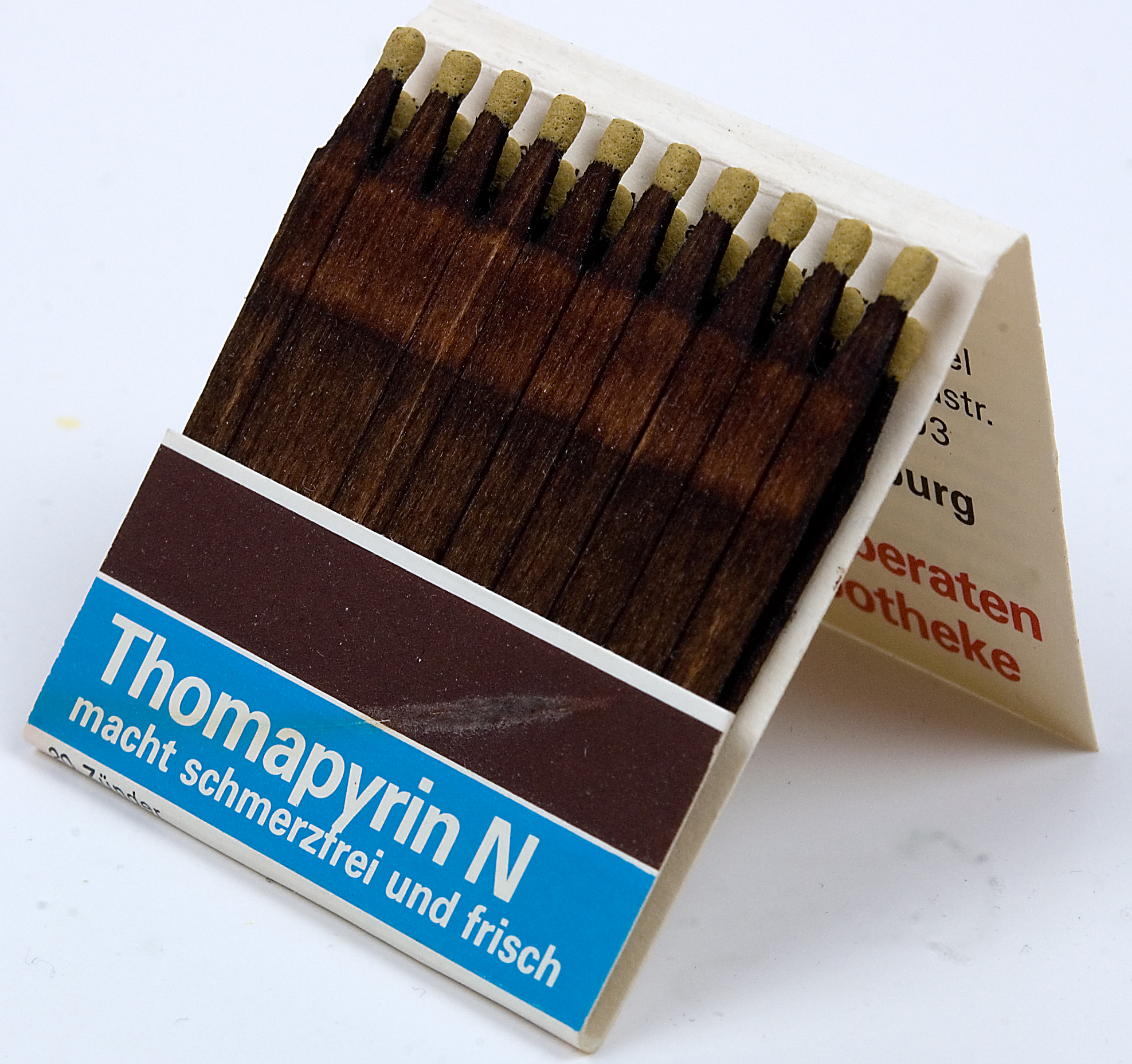
Matchbook (open)

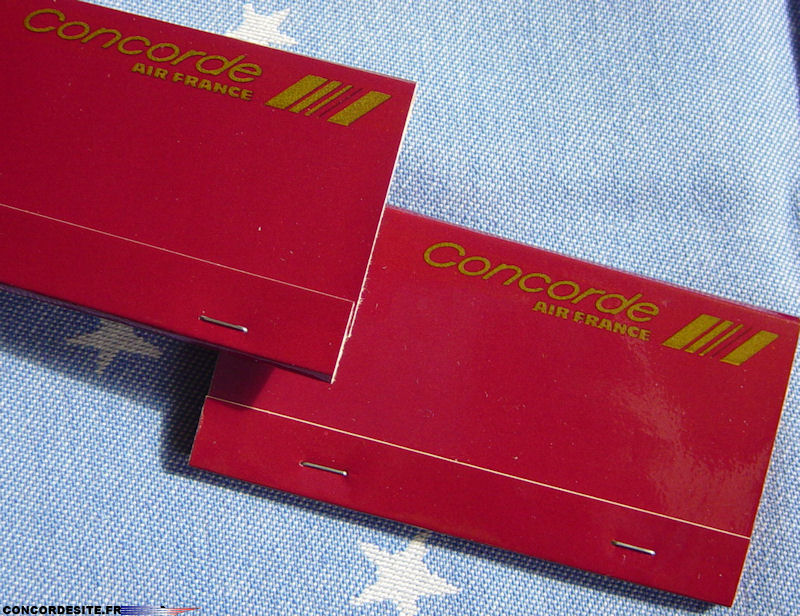
Supersonic Matchbook (1985-1986 given on Concorde)

A matchbook is a small paperboard folder comprising a matchcover, a quantity of matches, and a coarse striking surface on the exterior. The cover is opened to access the matches, which are attached in a comb-like arrangement and must be torn away before use. In contrast, a matchbox contains matches loosely packed in the interior tray.

The exterior of the matchcover is usually imprinted with a producer's logo, often with artistic decorations, or serves as an advertising/promotional medium for the undertaking by which it is sold or given away. The ease of making matchcovers of different shapes also made them quite a popular cheap promotional item or anniversary souvenir.

Manufacturing of matchbooks peaked during the 1940s and 1950s, then steadily declined because of the availability of disposable lighters and various anti-smoking health campaigns. In the late 2000s, matchbooks began to regain some of their popularity as a "retro" advertising item, particularly in high-end restaurants.

Although paper matches were patented in the 1880s, an early paper match "folder" was patented in September 1892 by Philadelphia patent attorney Joshua Pusey. However, the matchbook as we know it, with the striking surface on the outside, was patented a few weeks later by Charles Bowman of Lebanon, Pennsylvania. Pusey challenged Bowman's patent, but Bowman's patent was upheld. Pusey sold his patent to the Diamond Match Trust in 1896 and then served as the company's patent attorney. Bowman's company, the American Safety Head Match Company of Lebanon, PA did not last long, and Diamond Match Co. adapted his design into their product, becoming the first mass-producer of paper matchbooks.

Collecting of matchboxes, matchbooks, match labels and other match-related items is called phillumeny.

== Matchcover ==
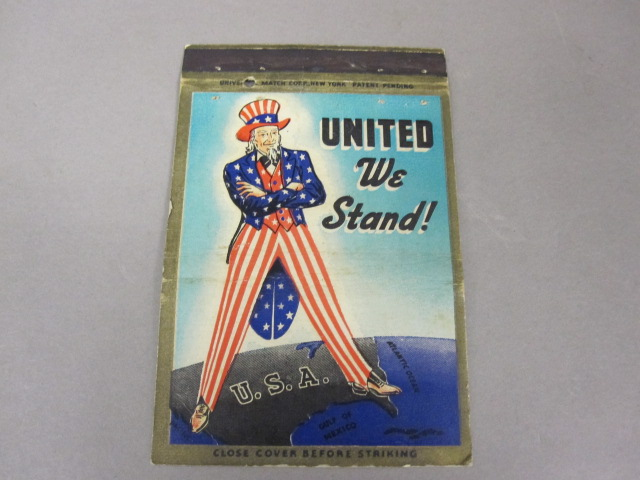
Matchbook cover, World War II, Uncle Sam

A "matchcover", or "matchbook cover", is a thin cardboard covering that folds over match sticks in a "book" or "pack" of matches. Covers have been used as a form of advertising since 1894, two years after they were patented, and since then, have attracted people who enjoy the hobby of collecting. Many historians point to the Mendelson Opera as the first to use matchbooks for advertising purposes; they hand wrote their promotional information on blank matchbook covers made by the Binghamton Match Company between 1893/94. Inspired by the Opera's innovation, Diamond Match salesman Henry Traute began approaching manufacturers to advertise their products on his company's matches, promoting them as something that would be viewed by their users many times a day. Among the first companies to order advertising matchbooks were Pabst beer, American Tobacco Company and Wrigley's Chewing Gum. He also encouraged his customers to give away matchbooks as a promotional item.

Collectors are known as phillumenists, or "lovers of light", and include people who have a shoe box or fish bowl filled with packs from local stores and restaurants, to serious collectors with covers organized in hundreds of different topics. In 2005, there were over 1800 active collectors in The Rathkamp Matchcover Society (The Voice of the Hobby Since 1941), spread over 20 countries worldwide.

The most expensive matchbook cost $6,000 US dollars and was purchased by Kevin Saucier (USA) in Santa Ana, California, USA, on 3 July 2015. The matchbook was created for a rare Charles Lindbergh dinner celebration dated 14 June 1927. The matchbook is missing four matches but is otherwise in mint condition as the cover is generally considered the collectible grade. It is believed that "The Lindbergh Matchbooks" as they are known in the hobby were discarded as they were printed with the rank of Captain; with the world-famous achievement Lindbergh was promptly promoted to Colonel. It is estimated 200 of these books were handed out at a dinner in his honor at the Astor Hotel in New York City. At last count there were about 13 known to exist.

=== Patents ===
US patent 483,166 Flexible Match patent, 27 September 1892 - set of two match combs shown enclosed folding paper match cover.

== See also ==
- Matchbox – another method of delivering matches (and advertising)

== Bibliography ==
- Prero, Mike (2005). "2005 Demographics".RMS Bulletin No. 512, January/February, pp. 1–4.
- Reskin, Bill (1993). The Matchcover Collectors Price Guide Worldcomm Press, ISBN 1566640369
- Steele, H. Thomas; Hiemann, Jim; Dyer, Rod (1987). Close Cover Before Striking: The Golden Age of Matchbook Art NY: Abbeville Press, ISBN 0-89659-695-8
