= Social advertising (social issues) =

Social advertising is the use of advertising to inform the public about a social issue or to influence their behavior.

While social advertising campaigns are often successful in raising awareness, they are typically unsuccessful in producing long-term behavior change of the type that can be achieved through the use of social marketing. Social advertising may, however, form a part of a social marketing intervention.

Social advertising makes people understand what the government does.

== See also ==
- Social marketing
- Social advertising (social relationships)
