= Phillumeny =

Hobby of match paraphernalia collecting

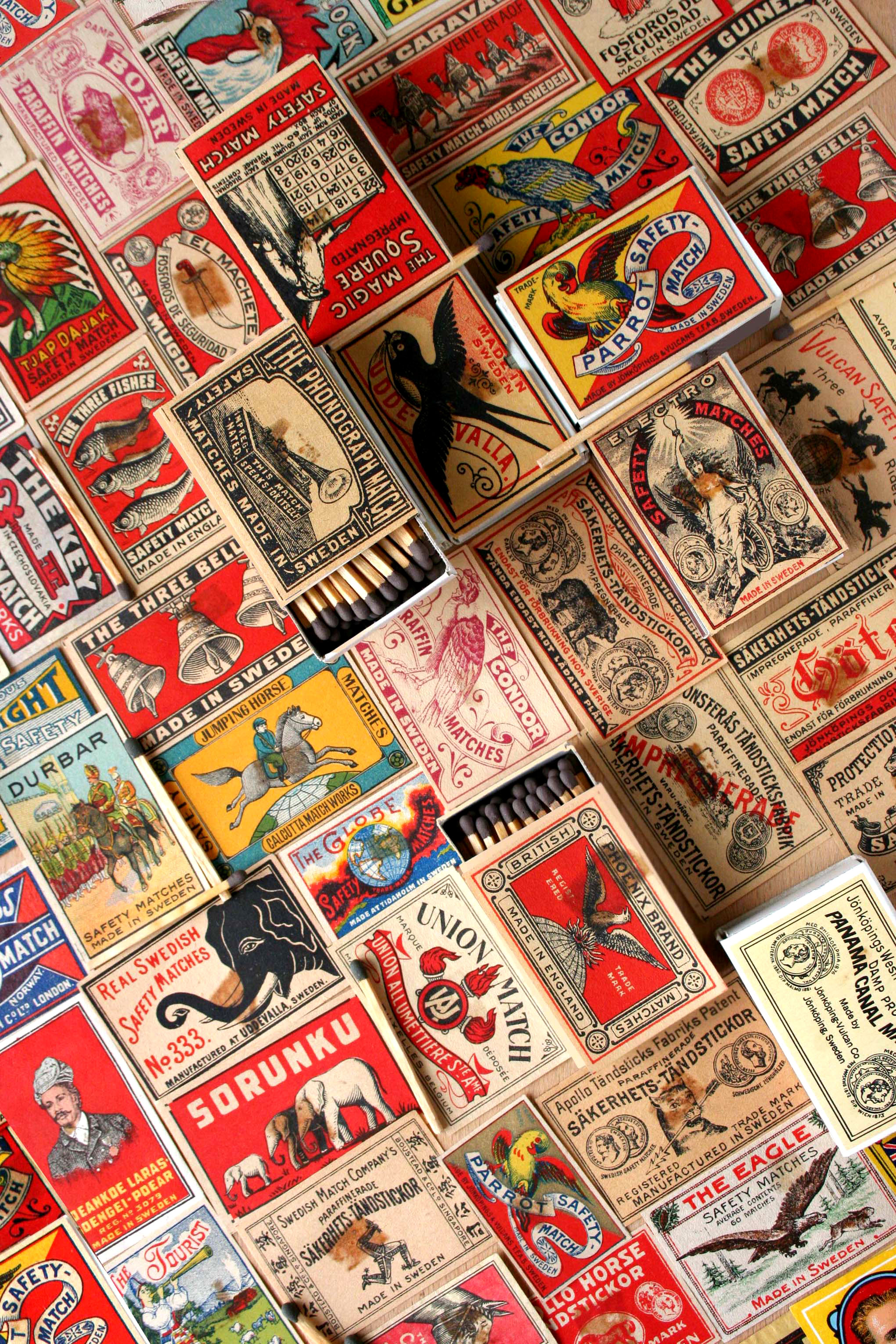
Assorted matchboxes and match labels

Phillumeny (also known as phillumenism) is the hobby of collecting different match-related items: matchboxes, matchbox labels, matchbooks, matchcovers, matchsafes, etc.

== Matchbox ==
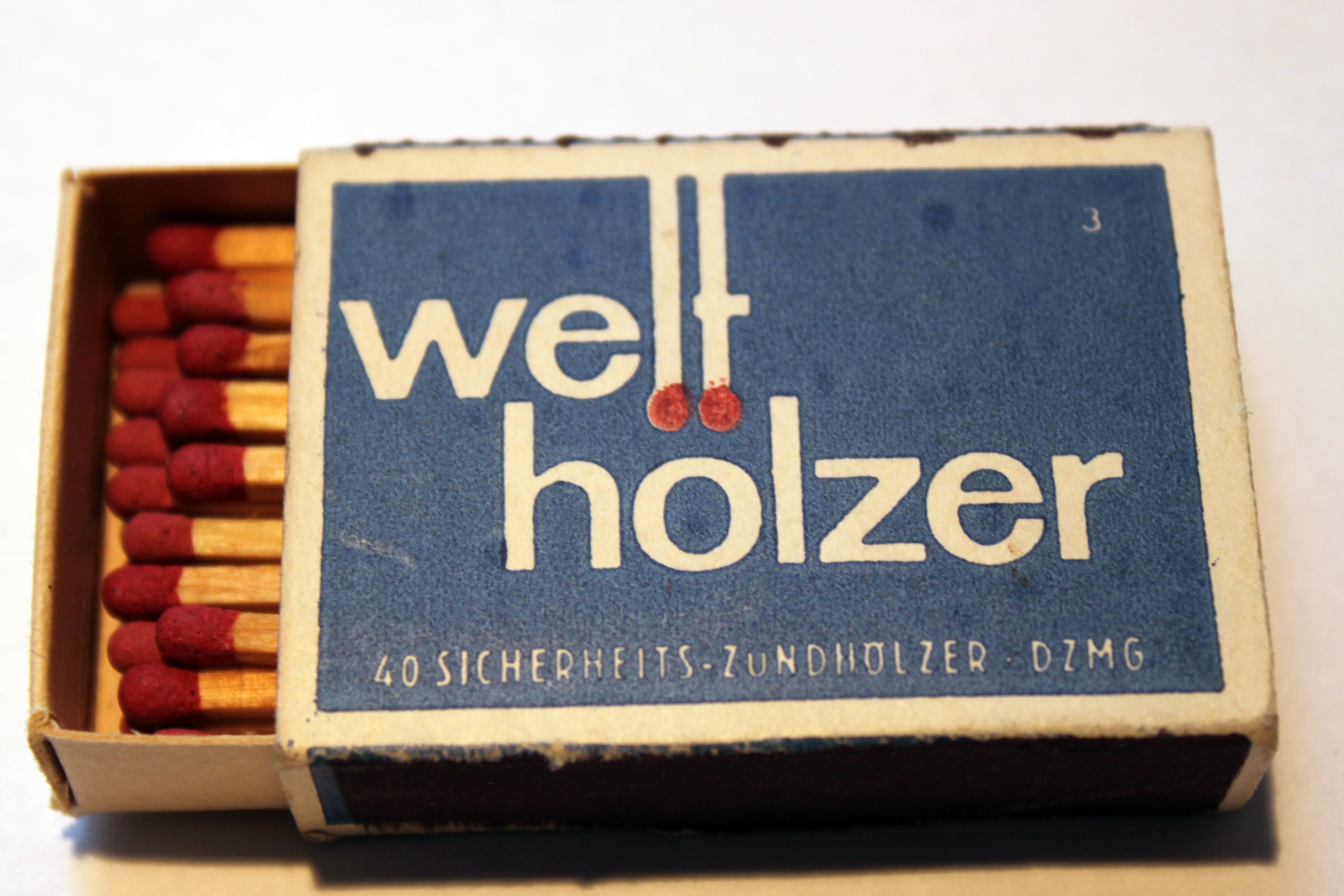
German matchbox containing safety matches.

A matchbox is a box made of cardboard or thin wood and designed to hold matches. It usually has a coarse striking surface on one edge for lighting the matches contained inside.

== Etymology ==
A person who engages in phillumeny is a phillumenist. The words, derived from Greek phil- [loving] + Latin lumen- [light], were introduced by the British collector Marjorie S. Evans in 1943 (who later became president of the British Matchbox Label & Booklet Society, now renamed the British Matchbox Label and Bookmatch Society). These two forms have been adopted by many other languages, e.g., philuméniste, fillumenista, Filumenist and филуменист.

== Phillumeny worldwide ==
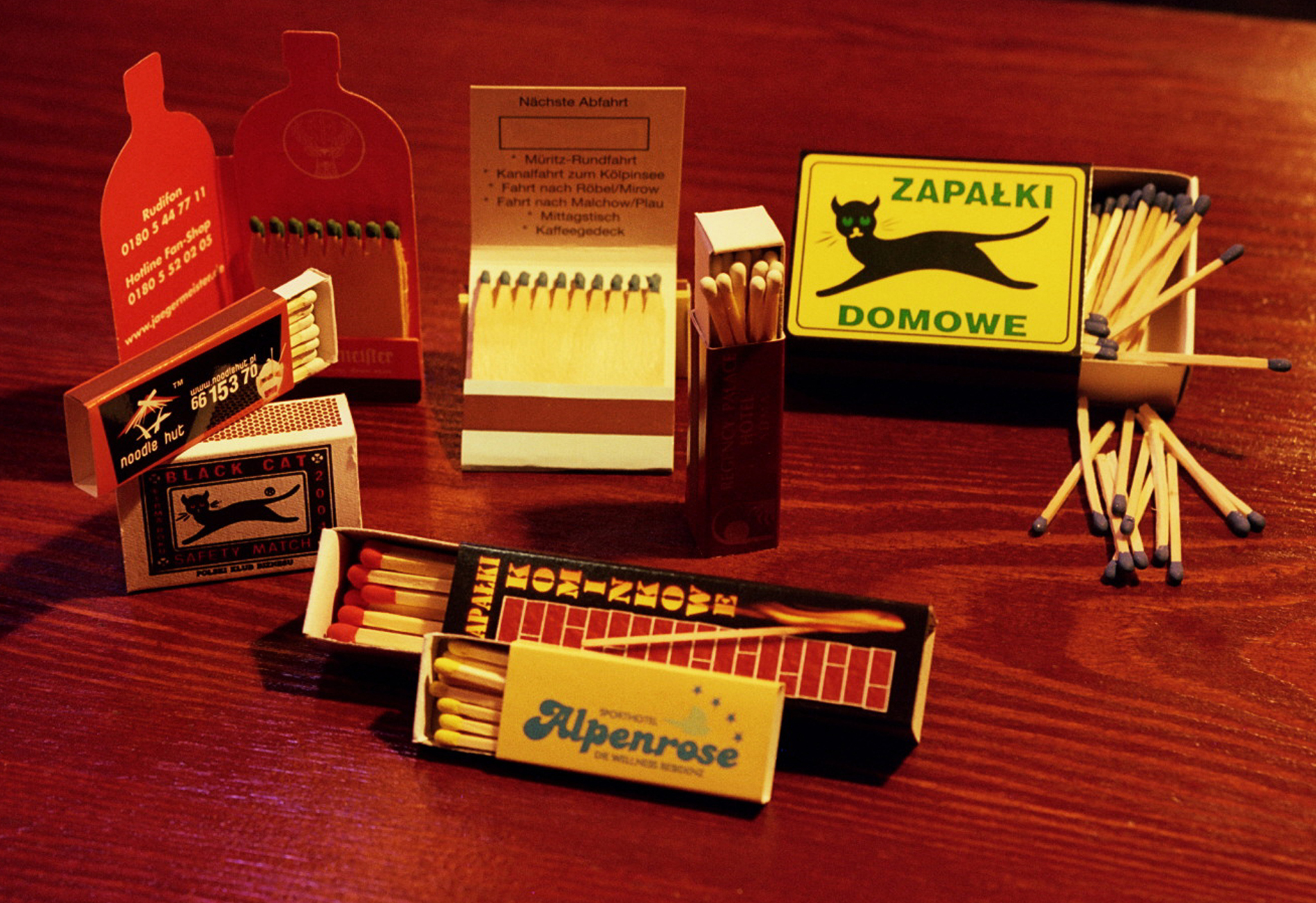
Polish matches from the Częstochowa match factory

Collecting of matchbox labels emerged together with matches. In some collections it is possible to find labels from chemical matches, produced from 1810 to 1815—long before the modern matches arrived. Quite often people who went abroad brought back matchboxes as souvenirs from other countries. After World War II a lot of match factories worked in close contact with local phillumenists, issuing special non-advertising sets. The hobby became especially widespread from the 1960s through the 1980s. Widespread introduction of bulky (for collectors) cardboard matchboxes with less distinct images on them, much poorer quality of print and, also some social phenomena, made this hobby (like many others, not connected with commerce) much less engaged.

== Notable phillumenists ==
In Japan, Teiichi Yoshizawa was listed in the Guinness Book of World Records as the world's top phillumenist. In Portugal, Jose Manuel Pereira published a series of albums to catalog and display matchbox collections called "Phillalbum".

== See also ==
- Collectable
- Go-to-bed matchbox, another (more elaborate) form of matchbox
- Matchbook, another form of packaging for matches
- Numismatics, the study and collection of coins, banknotes and other objects related to currency
- Philately, the study and collection of postage stamps and other objects related to mail and postal services
