= Made in EU =

Product label indicating manufacturing location

- Effective region: European Union
- Product category: Various
- Legal status: Proposed
- Website: EU Marking homepage

Made in EU was proposed by the European Commission in 2014. The Made in the EU label would indicate the product is mainly made in the European Union. After initial interest in the "Made in EU", no further proposal has been put forward for adopting a regulation in this regard.

== Significance ==
The EU is one of the world’s biggest markets with half a billion consumers. Professor Jerzy Buzek, past chair of the European Parliament Committee on Industry, Research and Energy (ITRE), said that "'Made in Europe' means we are proud of our activity." The benefits of a 'Made in Europe' tag would be that it highlights the positive effects of European regulations, which make products safer and less damaging to the environment.

== Quality ==
Carlos Moedas, EU Commissioner for Research, Science and Innovation, says that Europe needs to show a clear benefit to citizens and businesspeople, and that 'Made in Europe' could help by demonstrating the quality of European products. ‘If we want people to believe in the European project, we have to be the best, or nothing,’ he said. ‘That is our bet, the "Made in Europe" label continues to be seen as a guarantee of quality, whether we are talking about steam engines or shoes.’

== Economy ==
European products stamped with a ‘Made in Europe’ stimulate growth in the EU. A "Made in Europe" label is not only a commercial label but also a signature that social and environmental issues are respected. The need for the label comes as the EU works to increase its competitiveness against the US and China.

== History ==
The first attempt to regulate the marking of origin of products at EU-level was with the 2005 proposal for a Regulation on the indication of origin of certain products.

The "made in" proposal was launched under the European Single Market Act, of which has been repeatedly advocated by the European Council. Views on the proposal remain divided in the Council, with Sweden, Denmark and Netherlands reportedly being against it while France and Italy support the mandatory marking. The Commission was reportedly divided on the proposal as well.

== See also ==
- Ecolabel
- CE marking
- Tyre label
- Country of origin
- European Union energy label
