= Browser Ballett =

German comedy show

Browser Ballett is a German online and television satire program. Originally broadcast online, it is now broadcast by ZDFneo. It has received press coverage for its skits on the COVID-19 pandemic and the 2018 Chemnitz protests.
