= Matchstick model =

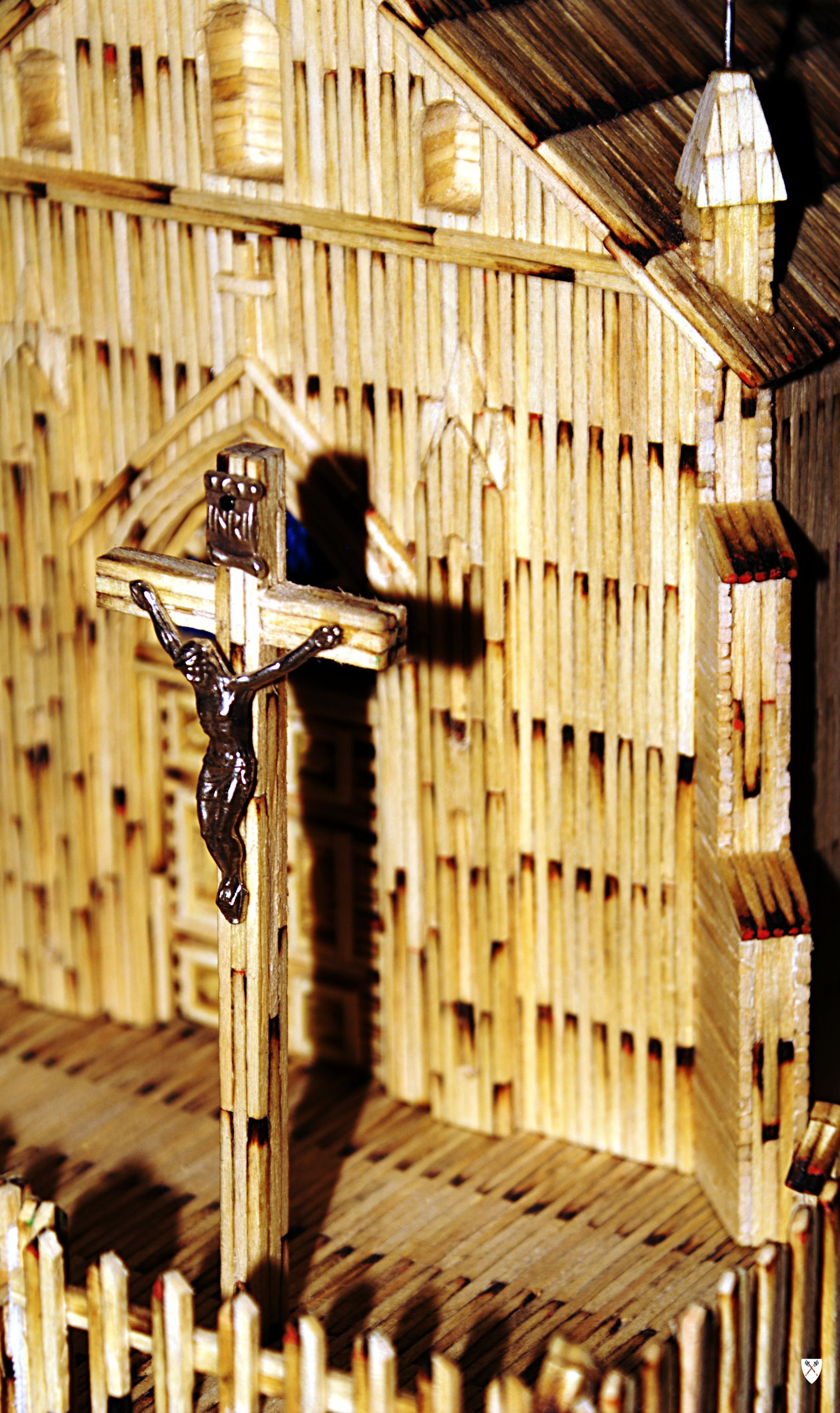
Detail of a matchstick model of a church, made from spent matches

Matchstick models are scale models made from matches as a hobby. Regular matches are not used, however, but a special modeling type which do not have the combustible heads, and can be bought from art and craft shops. Though before the serial production of these, actual matches were used with heads trimmed off, or kept on to add coloured detail.

== History ==
Originally, matchstick models were a pastime of prisoners (especially naval prisoners of war) during the 18th century. At the time, better funded modelers preferred to use more replicated parts for their models, like professionals today, and the poor couldn't afford to use up so many matches.

An early pioneer in matchstick models as an art form was Australian artist Len Hughes, whose first large-scale piece was a recreation of the Battle of the Spanish Armada that included 331 replica ships. Hughes went on to open the World of Matchcraft Museum in Caloundra, Queensland, which later closed.

== Construction ==
The matches are cut by means of a sharp knife and fixed together using glue, often being held in place by paperboard "formers" until the glue is dry. While the smallest gaps can be filled with glue, larger ones can be filled with specially carved matches. A number of hobbyists prefer to build their models from scratch. Many kits are available, consisting of instructions, pre-cut card formers and sufficient modeling matches for the project.

One of the larger matchstick models was a scratch-built replica of Notre Dame Cathedral, measuring over six feet in length and featuring electric lighting.

== Exhibitions ==
Gladbrook, Iowa is home to the Matchstick Marvels Museum that includes numerous models by matchstick model artist Patrick Acton. His work includes a 13-foot scale model of the USS Iowa.

== Religious art from matches ==
Religious art from matches is a unique form of folk art practiced by several artists who specialize in crafting intricate models from matchsticks, often with a focus on Jewish religious themes.

One of the notable pioneers of this art form was Hanan Weissman, a Holocaust survivor born near the border of Russia and Poland. Weissman immigrated to Israel at the age of 49 and, upon his retirement, began methodically constructing models of synagogues that were destroyed during the Holocaust, entirely out of matchsticks. Until his death at the age of 89, Weissman built over 50 detailed models of synagogues that had been lost during the Holocaust in Europe. These include the synagogue of the town of Wadowice near Kraków; a model of the synagogue in Vileyka, near Kaunas (burned down in 1942); the synagogue in Gąbin, west of Warsaw (burned down in 1939); and the synagogue of Kopychyntsi, his birthplace near the Poland–Ukraine border, among others. Some of his works are on display at the Testimony House (Beit HaEdut) in Nir Galim, Israel.

Another prominent matchstick artist is Shachar Puni, born in Israel in 1971. Puni began building matchstick models during his military service in the early 1990s. Much of his work consists of replicas of ritual Judaica objects, such as an etrog (citron) used during the festival of Sukkot, representations of the Seven Species, a Havdalah set for the conclusion of Shabbat, a scribe's inkwell used for writing Torah scrolls. and more.
