= Social advertising (social relationships) =

Advertising relying on social information

Social advertising is advertising that relies on social information or networks in generating, targeting, and delivering marketing communications. Many current examples of social advertising use a particular Internet service to collect social information, establish and maintain relationships with consumers, and for delivering communications. For example, the advertising platforms provided by Google, Twitter, and Facebook involve targeting and presenting ads based on relationships articulated on those same services. Social advertising can be part of a broader social media marketing strategy designed to connect with consumers.

== Social targeting ==
Since a pair of consumers connected via a relationship are more likely to be similar than an unconnected pair, information about such relationships can be used to infer characteristics of consumers useful for targeting. For example, predictions of an individual's home location can be improved using geographic information about their peers. Existing advertising platforms can allow advertisers to explicitly target the peers (e.g., Facebook friends, Twitter followers) of consumers who have a known affiliation with their brand. Thus, one way social advertising is expected to be effective is because social networks encode information about unobserved characteristics of consumers, including their susceptibility to adopt a product and to influence their peers to adopt. Social advertisement targets audiences' demographics based on customers browsing histories. This helped companies understand users' interests and target a specific group of users. Whether it is location or personal interest, different categories of companies can make the consumers on social media rely heavily on their advertisements. This is one of the reasons why social advertising has grown over time. Targeting their audience to real life stakeholders generally increase the attention of the advertised deal which brings up more profits for companies. Subsequently, the psychological effects that social media gives off to its users play a huge role in advertisement companies keeping their customers online. One of the main reasons users rely on social media is because it's a source of entertainment that provides them with a feeling of inclusiveness. In making the customers feel the inclusiveness, social advertising targeting a specific group of users is presented as if these advertisements are customized for the users in their perspective making them feel the attention that they do not often feel in the real world. You can use Social signals checker tool to find more information about links. Social signals are metrics that measure how much people interact with your content on social media. From likes, to shares, to comments; each of these signals contributes to an overall number that tells search engines like Google how much people like your content. The more social signals your website gets, the more likely it is to rank higher in Google. The reason for this is two-fold. First, social media is used by millions of people every day, and if your content is being shared and interacted with on these sites, it shows that it’s worthy of being seen. And second, social media sites are highly trusted by Google. So if you can get your content seen and interacted with on these platforms, you’ll be off to a great start.

== Social cues in advertisements ==
Social ads often include information about the affiliation of a peer with an advertised entity. For example, a social ad might indicate a friend has endorsed a product, highly rated a restaurant, or watched a particular film. In fact, some definitions make these personalized social signals a necessary condition for the advertising being social advertising. Inclusion of personalized social signals creates a channel for social influence. Experiments that remove peers' names or images from social advertisements provide evidence that their presence increases proximal outcomes (e.g., clicks on advertisements). This is technically how trends are started on social media. Since social media links a single profile to thousands of other accounts some being real-life friends or even acquaintances, the opinions and the bias a user has for other users who are also a customer of an advertisement on the feed can heavily affect whether to click on the advertisement or not. Once this pattern continues, the brand benefits from increased customers, profit, and attention. Social networking can spread rapidly because 71 percent of the world's population contributes and uses social media which means social advertising gives companies a better marketing technique than a physical poster advertisement.

== Word of mouth ==
Advertisers often attempt to use word of mouth to affect consumers and their decisions to adopt products and services. Ads and other inducements targeted at a seed set of individuals can be designed to produce a larger cascade of adoption through influence. Businesses are also using social media to attempt to identify and persuade influential consumers to spread positive messages about their products or services. Consequently, not only on social platforms but also in physical settings, users start talking to each other. When individuals develop an intimate relationship with each other, it is quite heavily based on shared characteristics, interests, and personalities. If one social media user becomes a regular customer to a well-known company that advertises often, there is a higher chance that all the other people who have intimate relationships with that one customer will be exposed to the online advertisement more than another user who might be completely new to a brand that is being advertised on screen. In reality, this happens to not only one user but to most of the users which mean a single brand advertisement online can have to potential of being talked about between billions and trillions of people all around the globe.

== Relationship marketing ==
To accurately conduct relationship marketing, businesses must develop and manage six marketplaces: internal, customer, referral, supplier, influencer and employee. To maintain relationship marketing, customers often see social media influencers getting free sponsorships or PR boxes just to advertise their products. At times, users who become customers through these social influencers will get a better deal than regular customers which stands as a very commonly used marketing technique. By doing this, users think they are receiving special treatment when in reality it very much benefits social influencers and brands. Especially for brands that are just starting, they use this marketing technique so that their names can be out there, and people will start talking, which is their initial goal.
