= Matchbox =

Container for holding matches

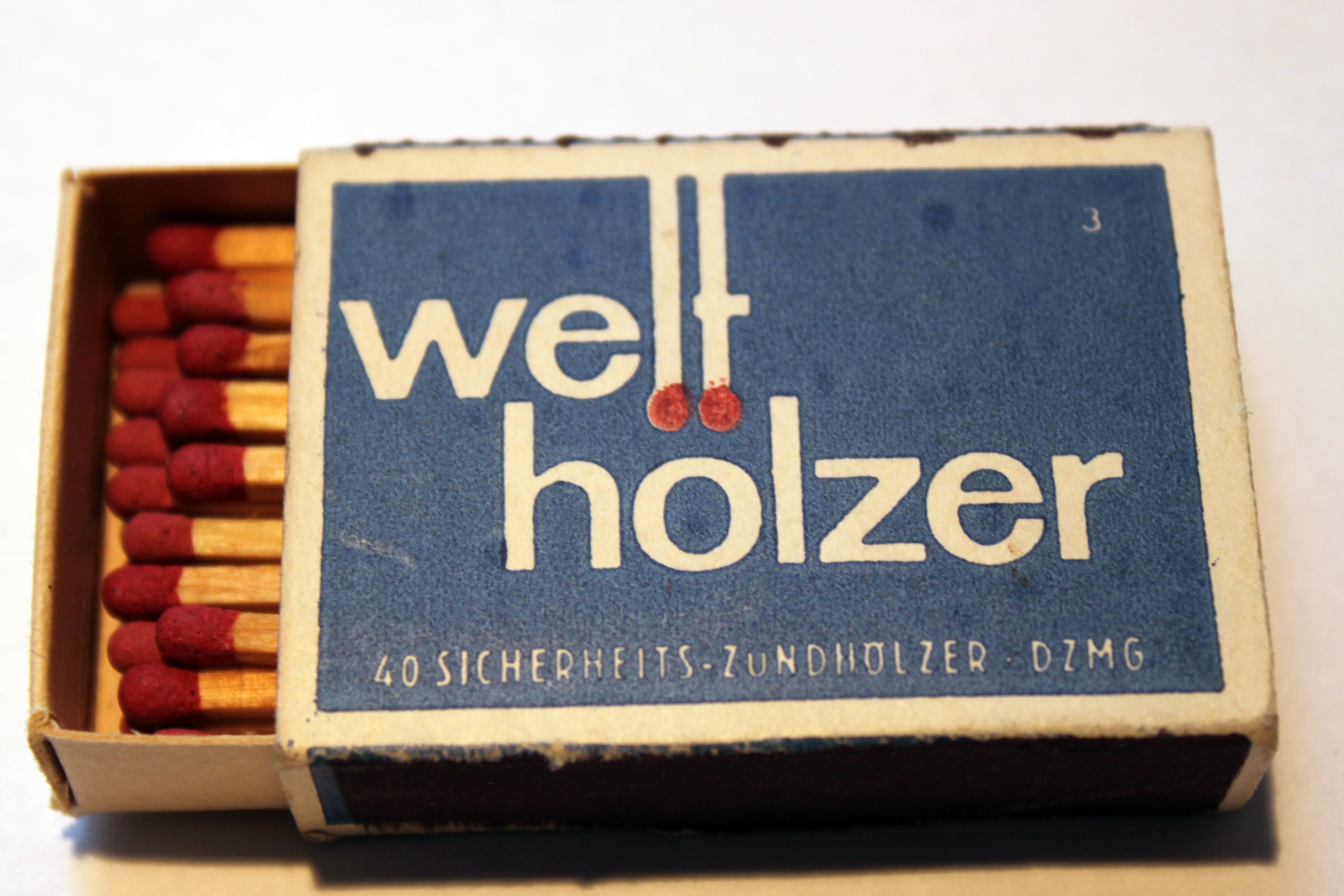
German matchbox containing safety matches

A matchbox is a container or case for matches, made of cardboard, thin wood, or metal, generally in the form of a box with a separate drawer sliding inside the cover. Matchboxes generally measure 5 x 3.5 x 1.5 cm, and commonly have coarse striking surfaces on the edges for lighting the matches. Cylindrical matchboxes with a round cover on one end are also available.

== Metallic model ==
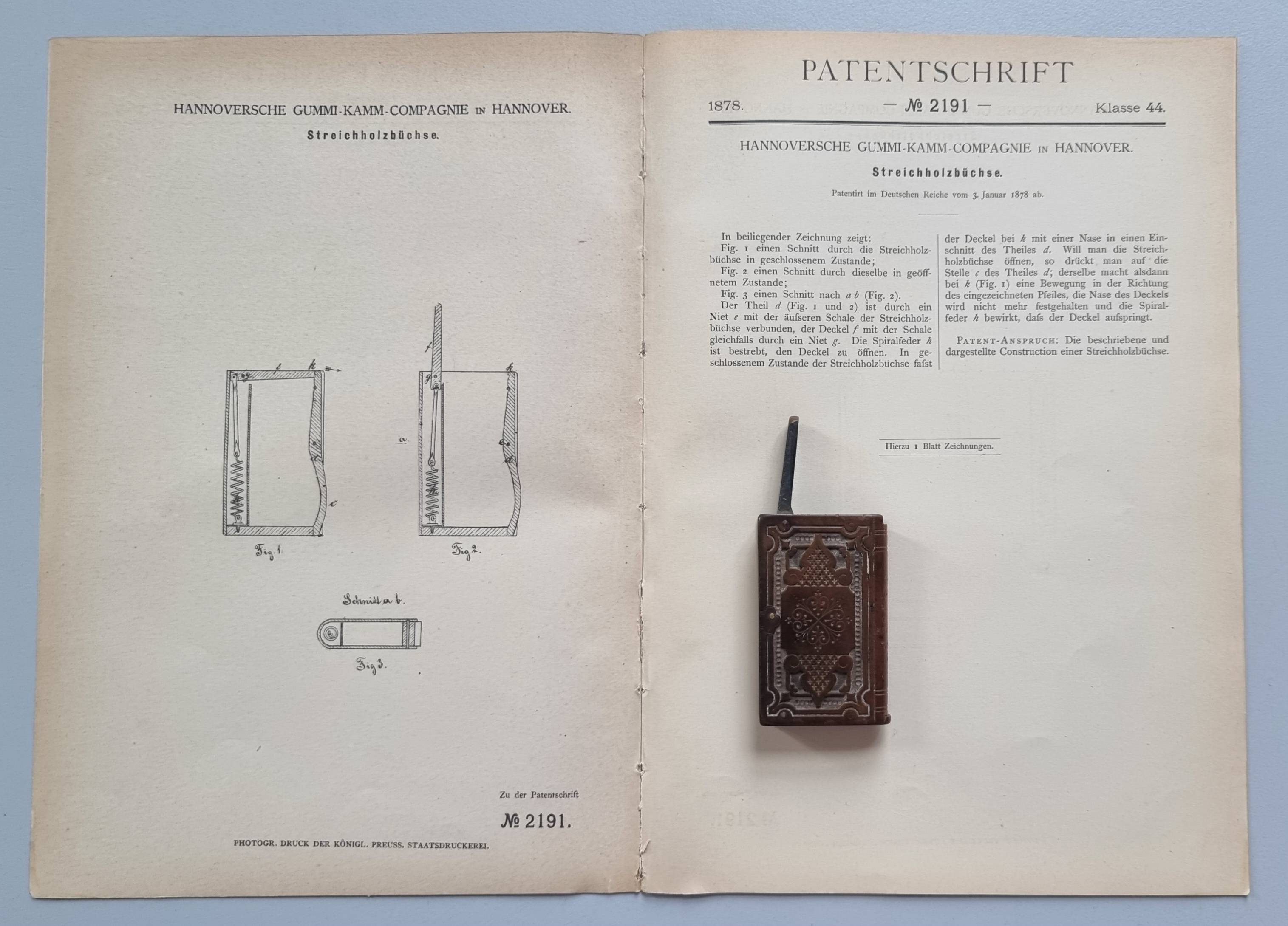
PATENT DOCUMENT, 1878. Nº 2191 — Class 44.HANNOVERSCHE GUMMI-KAMM-COMPAGNIE IN HANNOVER. Matchbox.

There are metal matchboxes some of which also have a hollow cylinder in which a nitrated wick is housed so that it can ignite when it is windy.

The metal boxes have a scraper that is usually placed on the edge, in a slot made for this purpose. A sort of file that can be machined to the same metal casing or be a metal sheet, welded or glued.

In 1878 the patent document, nº 2191 class 44, was registered by Hannoversche Gummi-Kamm-Compagnie in Hannover, about a metallic matchbox, with the following text:

Patented in the German Empire on January 3, 1878.

The accompanying drawing shows:

Fig. 1 shows a section through the matchbox in the closed state;

Fig. 2 shows a section through the same in the open state;

Fig. 3 shows a section according to a b (Fig. 2). - Part d (Fig. 1 and 2) is connected to the outer shell of the matchbox by a rivet e, the lid f is also connected to the shell by a rivet g. The spiral spring h strives to open the lid. When the matchbox is closed, the lid at k fits with a nose into an incision in part d. If you want to open the matchbox, you press on point c of part d; The same then makes a movement at k (Fig. 1) in the direction of the arrow shown, the nose of the lid is no longer held and the spiral spring h causes the lid to pop open.

Patent claim: The described and illustrated construction of a matchbox.

== Other types ==
There are other types different from those described above, made of rubber, wood, mother of pearl, ivory, bone, celluloid, etc. sometimes with very whimsical shapes, Apart from the pocket boxes mentioned, there are tabletop match boxes and boxes meant to hang on a wall. Tabletop matchboxes are of some capacity, made of fine wood, cut glass, etc., and may have a lid, the only condition being that they close well and have enough weight to allow striking a match without moving the box. Match boxes hung on the wall are used in kitchens, they are usually made of ash wood, they do not have a lid and a hook or hole protrudes from the back of the box to hang them on the wall.

All matchboxes must have a scraper so that the head of the match can be rubbed against it to light it. Ordinary cardboard boxes have it on one or both sides. In tabletop or wall match boxes, the scraper is usually made of sandpaper, attached to the most visible part and at the top of the box.

== Matchbook ==
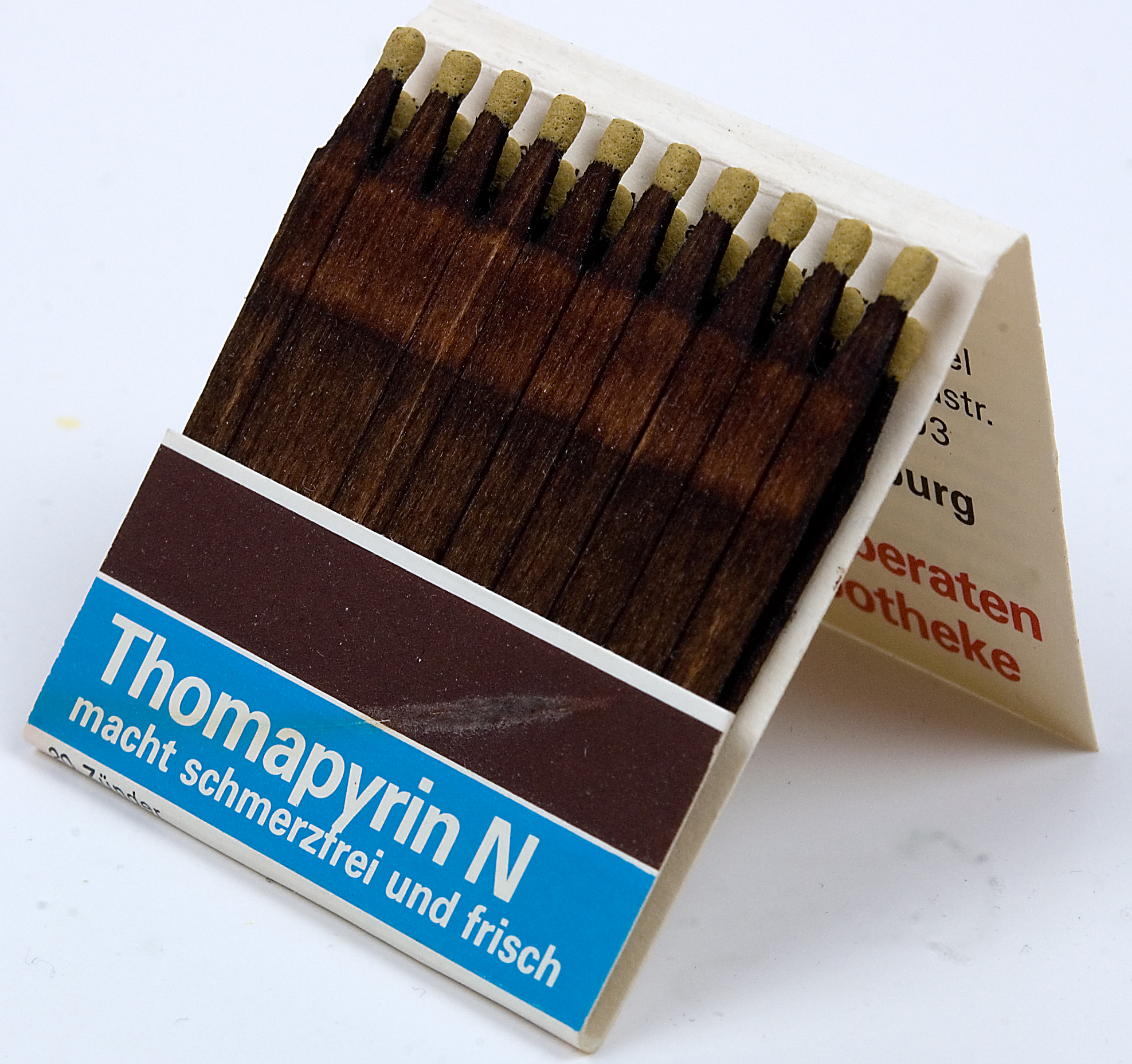
Matchbook (open)

A matchbook is a small cardboard folder that contains matches joined at the base and has a striking surface on the outside. The binder must be opened to access the matches, which are placed in a comb shape and must be torn to use them, unlike those in a standard matchbox where they are loosely packed into a drawer that can be slid with the finger.

== Phillumeny ==
Phillumeny is the hobby of collecting different items related to matches, matchboxes, matchbox labels, matchbooks, matchbox covers, etc.

In Japan, Teiichi Yoshizawa was listed in the Guinness Book of Records as the best collector of matches in the world. In Portugal, Jose Manuel Pereira published a series of albums to catalog and display matchbox collections called "Phillalbum".
