= Highline Trail (Glacier National Park) =

Hiking trail in Glacier National Park, Montana, US

Coordinates: 48°46′12″N 113°45′46″W

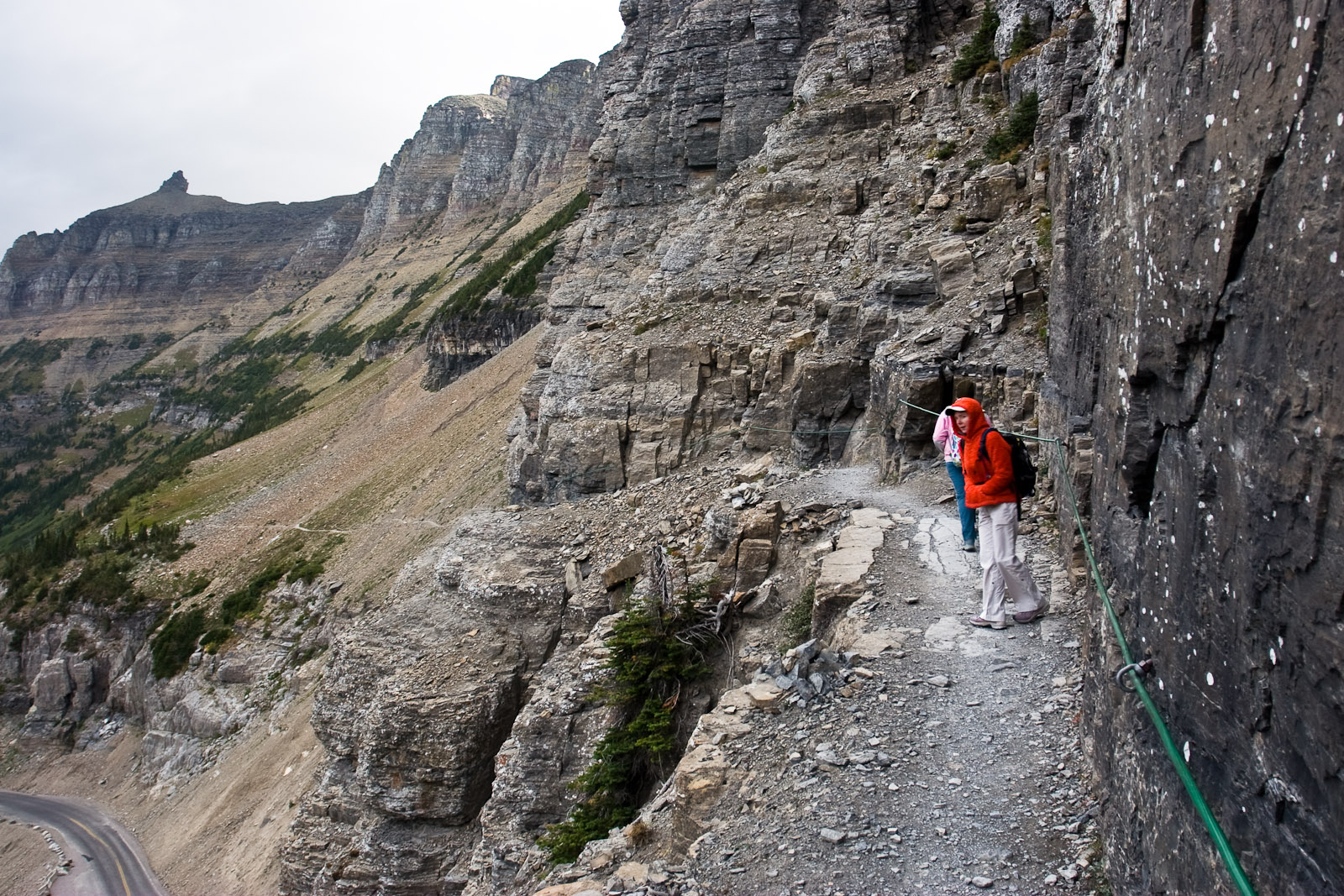
Hikers follow the Garden Wall section of the trail

The Highline Trail is a scenic hiking trail in Glacier National Park, Montana, United States. The trail stretches 7.6 miles (12.2 km) from Logan Pass to Granite Park Chalet, and continues another 11.9 miles (19.2 km) from there to Fifty Mountain Campground. The trail follows the Garden Wall ridge and the continental divide for most of its length. The trail offers scenic views of glaciated U-shaped valleys. A 1.2-mile (1.9 km) round trip side trail takes hikers up the side of the Garden Wall to an overlook to Grinnell Glacier.
