= Big Drift =

Snow drift in Montana, US

Coordinates: 48°41′50″N 113°42′29″W

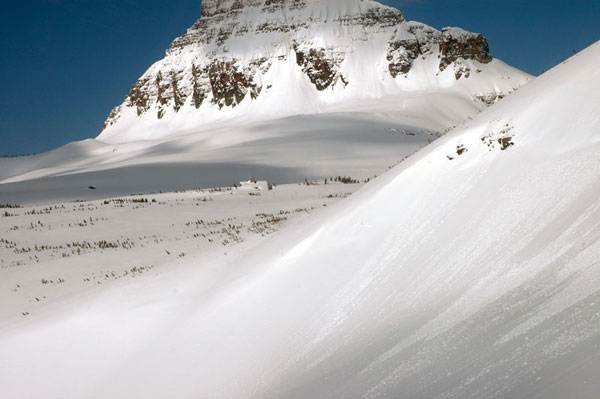
The Big Drift as seen on March 23, 2006. Buildings in center are at Logan Pass while the Going-to-the-Sun Road lies buried under the Big Drift on right side of image.

The Big Drift is in Glacier National Park, in the U.S. state of Montana and is an area along the Going-to-the-Sun Road where a large amount of winter snow can accumulate to depths of 80 feet (24 m). Located immediately east of Logan Pass, the westerly winds push snow over the crest of the Continental Divide onto the eastern flank of a long arête which extends south from Pollock Mountain. West of the divide, this arête is known as the Garden Wall.

As spring approaches, the region is surveyed by helicopter in preparation for snow removal that will be needed in order to reopen the Going-to-the-Sun Road for the summer season. By early April, snow removal crews working from either end of the 53 miles (85 km) roadway have begun to ascend the steeper east and west slopes of the Lewis Range.

The area of the Big Drift is usually reached by late May, and it often can take a month to clear this one stretch of road that is slightly more than 1 mile (1.6 km) in length. Survey crews identify avalanche hazards and help to locate the road using global positioning equipment. Large cornices are usually removed using explosives, then excavators and front-end loaders move the snow over the cliffsides or into dump trucks.

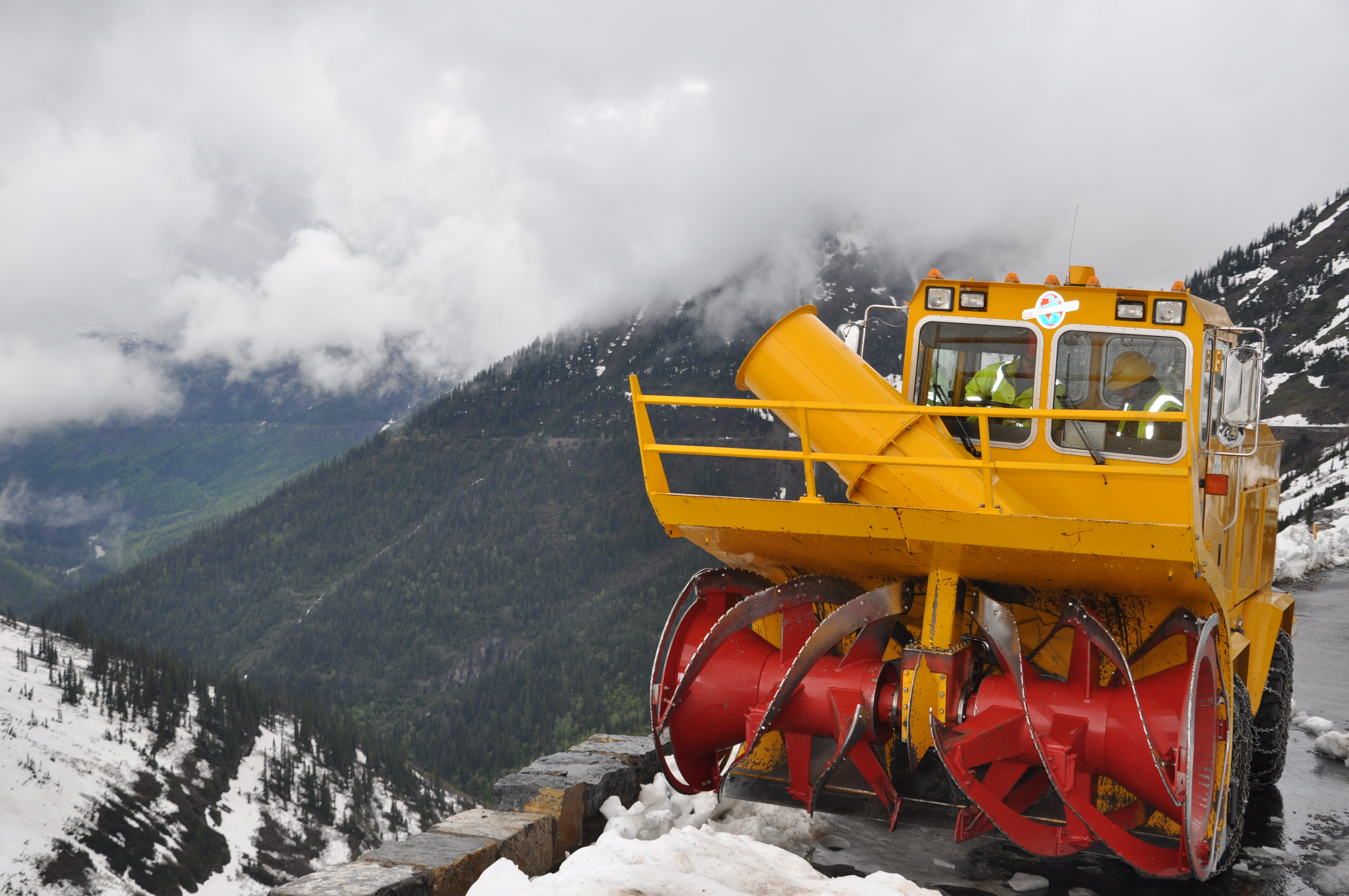
This truck is used to blow away the snow. The snow is usually fed into the snowplow's snowblower by a bulldozer.

The entire Going-to-the-Sun Road takes about ten weeks to plow, even with equipment that can move 4,000 short tons of snow an hour. By the first of June of each year, the Logan Pass visitor center can usually be reached by vehicle from at least one side of the Continental Divide. In 2011, due to abnormally heavy late winter and early spring snowfall, the Going-to-the-Sun Road did not open until July 13, which, at that time, was the latest opening since the road was built. That record was passed in 2022, when Going-to-the-Sun Road opened July 15, exactly 89 years since the road was dedicated.
