= Logan Pass =

Mountain pass in Montana, United States

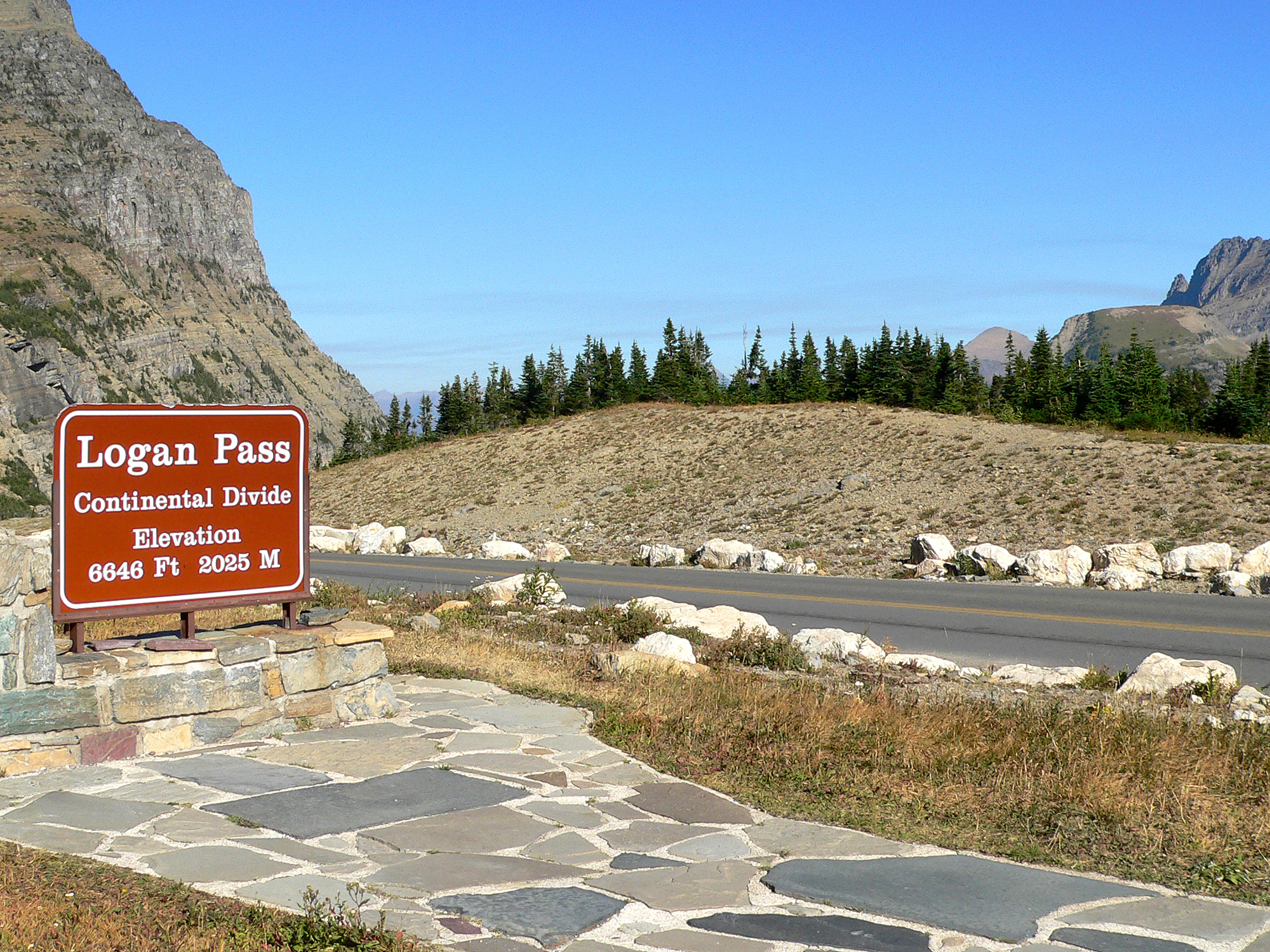
- Logan Pass

- Location within Montana
- Elevation: 6,646 ft (2,026 m)
- Traversed by: Going-to-the-Sun Road

Location
- Location: Flathead / Glacier counties, Montana, United States
- Range: Lewis Range
- Coordinates: 48°41′47.72″N 113°43′5.91″W

Logan Pass (elevation 6,646 ft (2,026 m)) is located along the Continental Divide in Glacier National Park, in the U.S. state of Montana. It is the highest point on the Going-to-the-Sun Road. The pass is named after Major William R. Logan, the first superintendent of the park.

The Logan Pass Visitor Center is open during the summer season just east of the pass. The pass is a popular starting point for hiking and backpacking trips. The most popular trail is the Highline Trail which heads north along the west side of the continental divide, through an area known as the Garden Wall, due to the proliferation of wildflowers which grow there during the summer.

Just east of the pass, an area known as Big Drift often records over 100 feet (30 m) of snowfall, much of which has been pushed over the continental divide by the prevailing westerly winds during the winter. The pass is closed during the winter due to avalanche hazards and the virtual impossibility of keeping the Going-to-the-Sun Road open, yet is generally open from mid-to-late June until mid October.

A record wind gust was recorded at Logan Pass on April 9, 2014, of 139 miles per hour. The pass was closed at that time. "The previous record gust recorded at Logan Pass was 133 mph, on Dec. 13, 2006. The average wind speed during the hour the record gust was recorded was 66 mph."

The pass provides an excellent vantage point to view wildlife. A visitor is almost guaranteed to spot a mountain goat, as mountain goats have become accustomed to summertime human visitation.

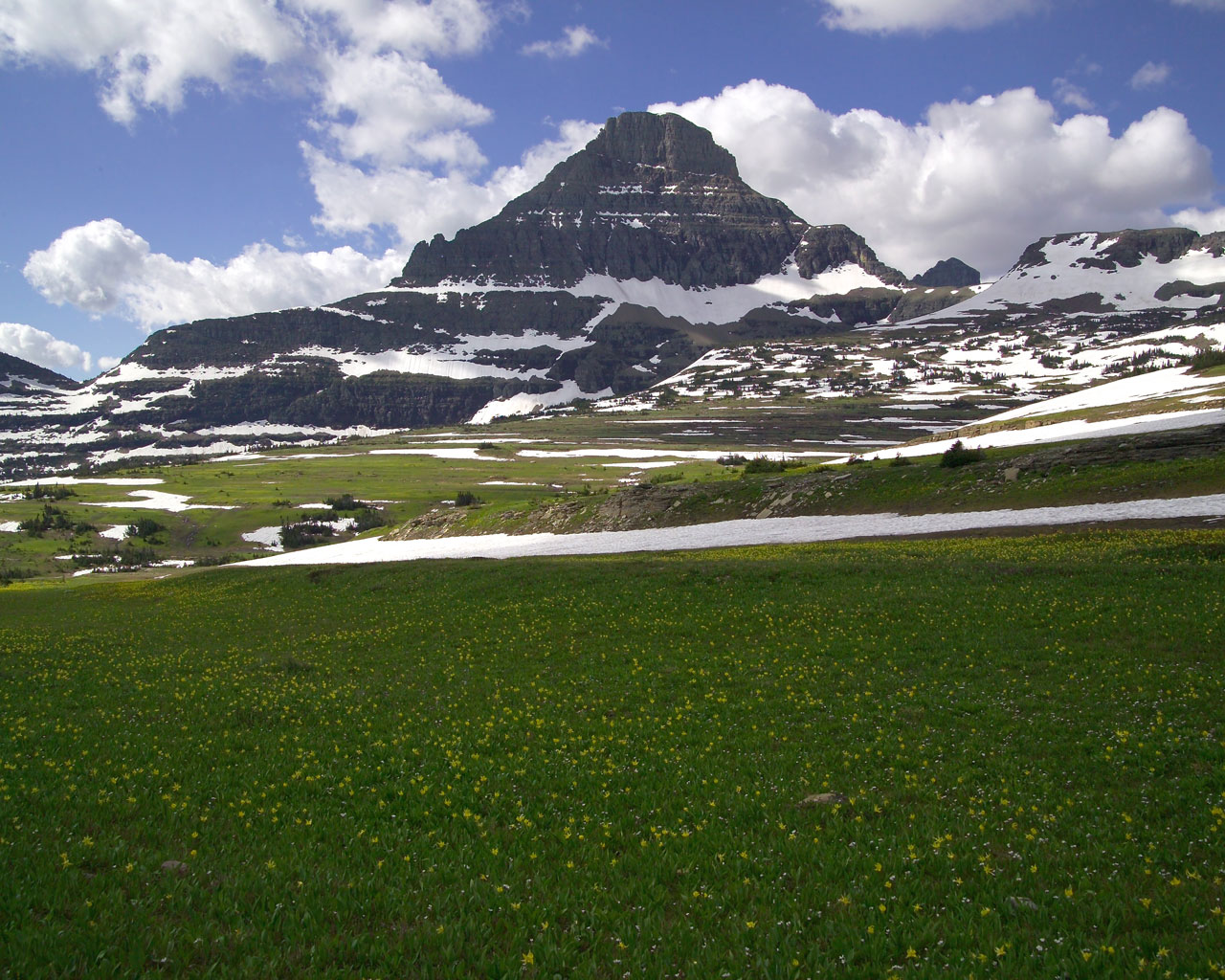

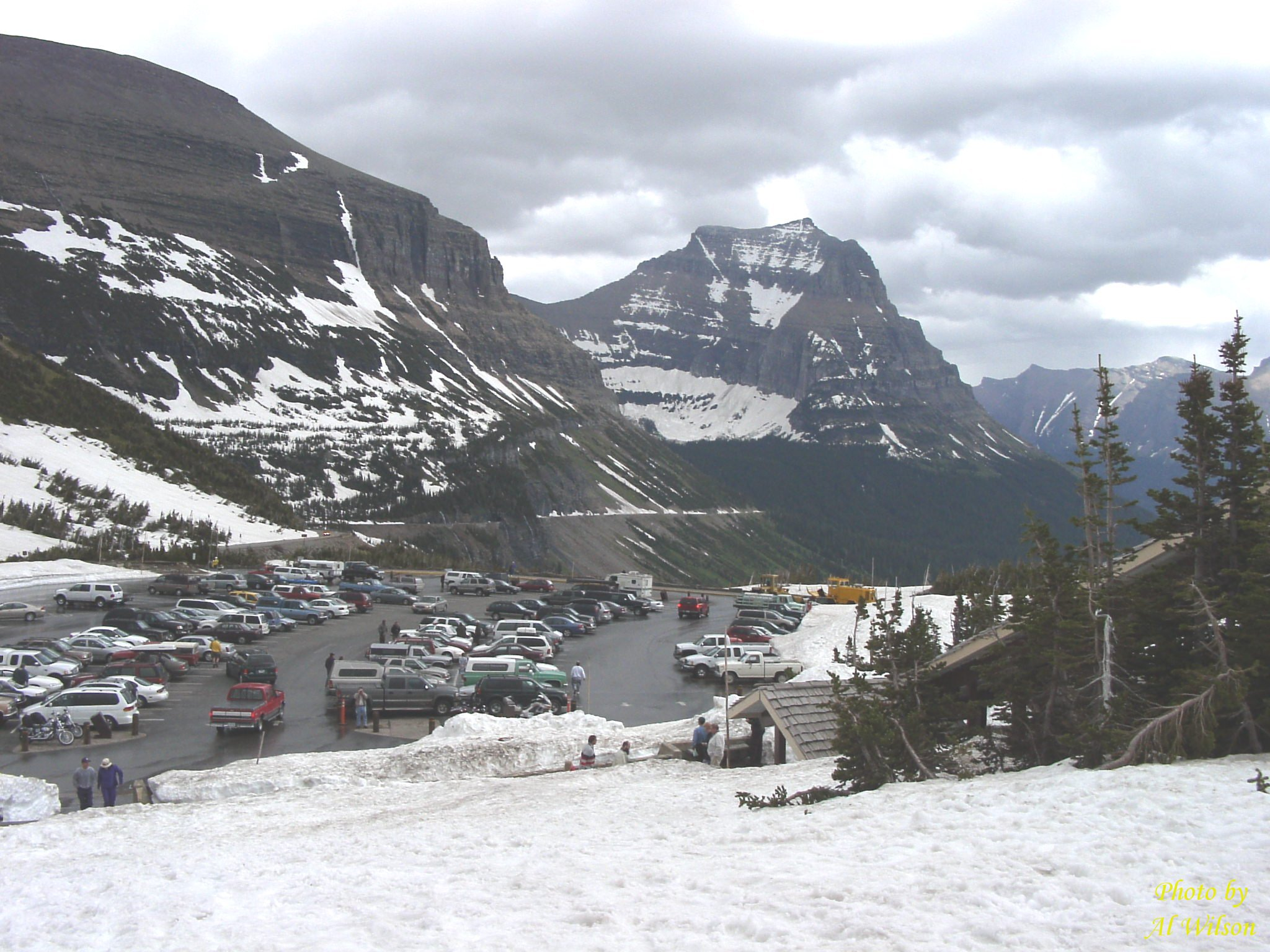

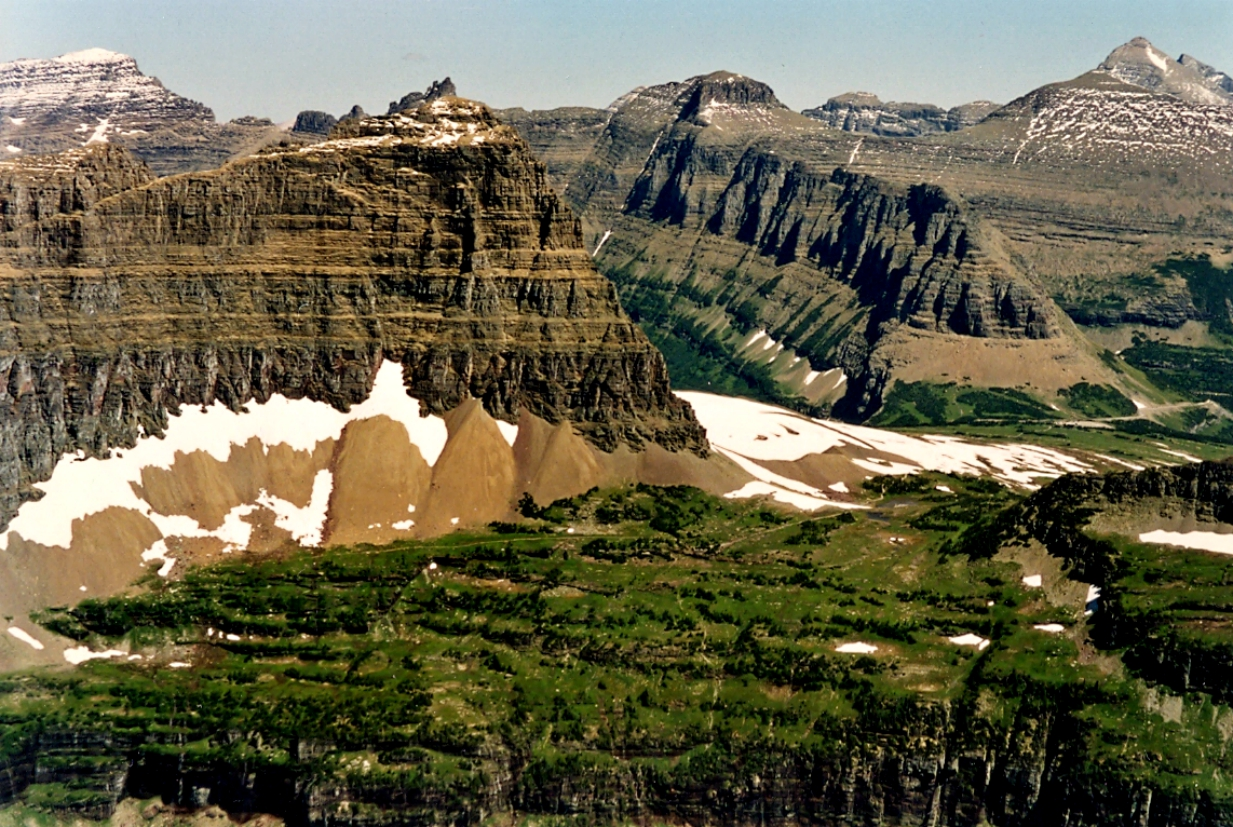

== See also ==
- Mountain passes in Montana
