= Garden Wall =

Alpine area in Glacier National Park, Montana, US

The Garden Wall
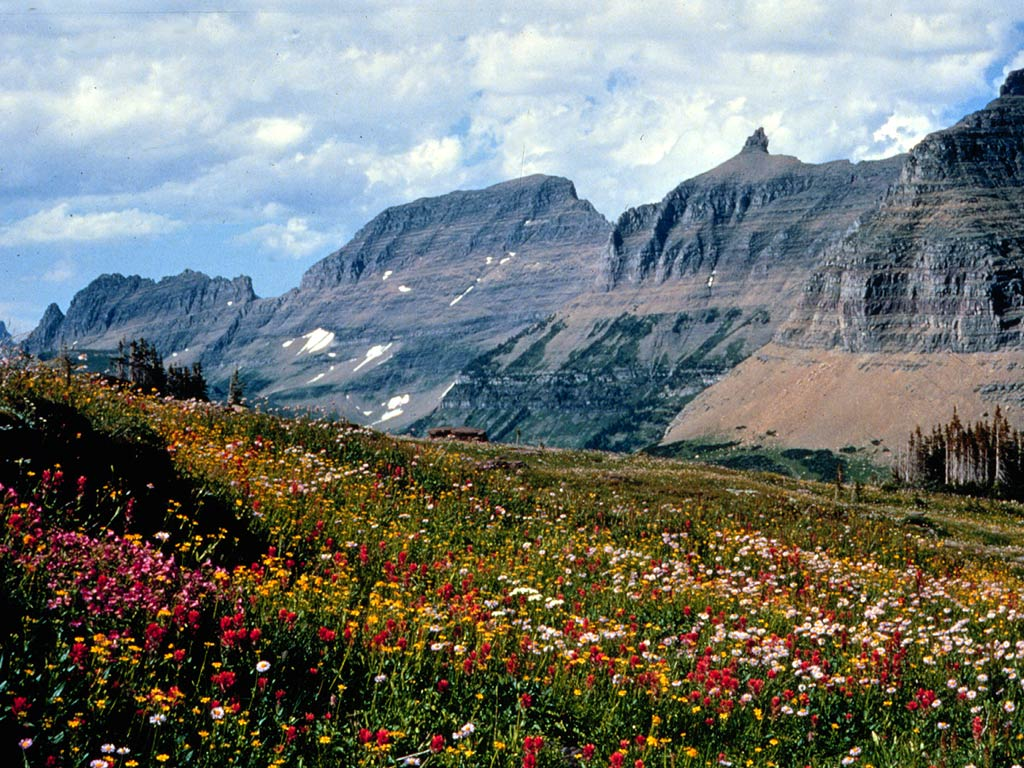

Highest point
- Peak: Mount Gould
- Elevation: 9,553 ft (2,912 m)
- Coordinates: 48°44′34″N 113°42′52″W

Geography
- Location: Glacier National Park, Montana, United States
- Range coordinates: 48°44′14″N 113°42′40″W

The Garden Wall is a steep alpine area within Glacier National Park well known during the summer months to be heavily covered in dozens of species of flowering plants and shrubs. Located along the west side of the Continental divide and extending northward from Logan Pass, the Garden Wall can be traversed via the popular Highline Trail and for a distance of over 5 mi (8.0 km) to the Granite Park Chalet. The Going-to-the-Sun Road also passes through portions of the Garden Wall northwest of Logan Pass. The Weeping Wall is a short stretch of the Going-to-the-Sun Road where water cascades over the Garden Wall to the roadway below. The Garden Wall is an arête or rock spine that separates the Many Glacier region of the park from Lake McDonald valley. From Highline Trail it is a 2 miles (3.2 km) round trip hike up Garden Wall Trail to Glacier Overlook, which overlooks Grinnell Glacier from the Garden Wall.

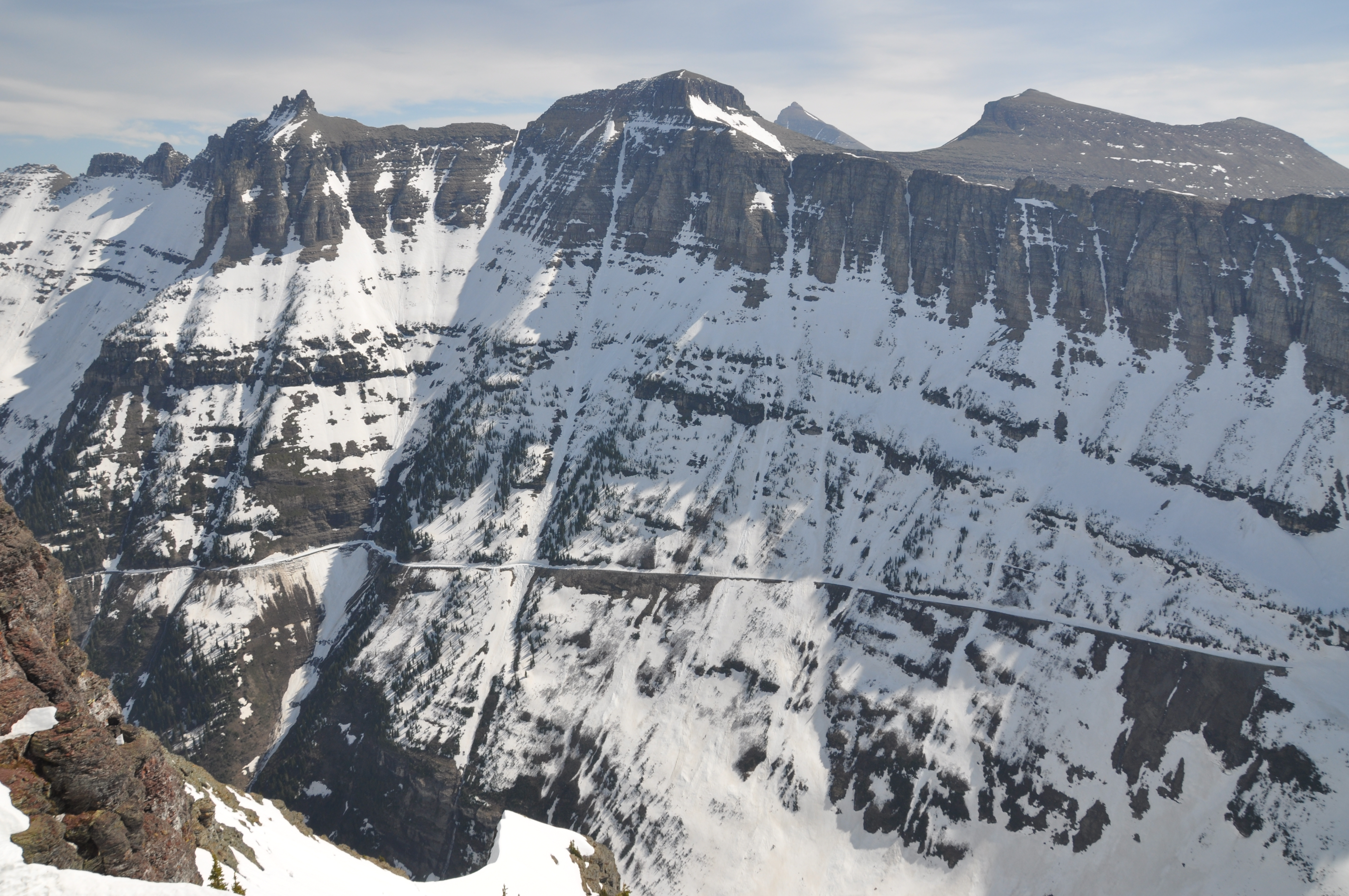
The Going-To-The-Sun-Road is carved into the side of the Garden Wall.
