= List of National Historic Landmarks in Montana =

The List of National Historic Landmarks in Montana contains the landmarks designated by the U.S. Federal Government for the U.S. state of Montana. There are 28 National Historic Landmarks (NHLs) in Montana.

The United States National Historic Landmark program is operated under the auspices of the National Park Service, and recognizes structures, districts, objects, and similar resources nationwide according to a list of criteria of national significance. The Montana landmarks emphasize its frontier heritage, the passage of the Lewis and Clark Expedition, Montana's contributions to the national park movement, and other themes.

Three sites in Montana extend across the Idaho or North Dakota state line, and are listed by the National Park Service as Idaho NHLs or North Dakota NHLs.

== Key ==
	National Historic Landmark
^{†}	National Historic Landmark District
^{#}	National Historic Site, National Historical Park, National Memorial, or National Monument

== List ==
	Landmark name	Image	Date designated	Location	County	Description
1^{†}	Bannack Historic District	Bannack Historic District	July 4, 1961 (#66000426)	Bannack; 45°09′40″N 112°59′44″W	Beaverhead	Site of Montana's first major gold discovery in 1862, and served as the capital of Montana Territory for eight months in 1864 and 1865.
2^{†}	Butte–Anaconda Historic District	Butte–Anaconda Historic District	July 4, 1961 (#66000438)	Butte; 46°00′59″N 112°32′10″W	Deer Lodge and Silver Bow	One of the largest and most famous boomtowns in the American West; the district includes more than 6,000 contributing properties.
3	Camp Disappointment	Camp Disappointment	May 23, 1966 (#66000434)	Browning; 48°35′57″N 112°47′53″W	Glacier	Lewis and Clark Expedition site.
4	Chief Joseph Battleground of Bear's Paw	Chief Joseph Battleground of Bear's Paw	June 7, 1988 (#70000355)	Chinook; 48°22′39″N 109°12′34″W	Blaine	Site of the final engagement of the Nez Perce War.
5	Chief Plenty Coups (Alek-Chea-Ahoosh) Home	Chief Plenty Coups (Alek-Chea-Ahoosh) Home	January 20, 1999 (#70000354)	Pryor; 45°25′35″N 108°32′54″W	Big Horn	The 2-story house of Crow Nation chief Plenty Coups during 1884-1932, plus a log store and the Plenty Coups Spring.
6	Deer Medicine Rocks	Deer Medicine Rocks	March 2, 2012 (#12000244)	near Lame Deer	Rosebud	
7	First Peoples Buffalo Jump	First Peoples Buffalo Jump	July 21, 2015 (#15000623)	Ulm; 47°28′46″N 111°31′27″W	Cascade	Believed to be the largest buffalo jump in North America, and maybe the world; possibly the most-utilized on the continent as well
8^{†}	Fort Benton Historic District	Fort Benton Historic District	November 5, 1961 (#66000431)	Fort Benton; 47°49′10″N 110°40′11″W	Chouteau	Established as a fur trading center in 1847, the fort prospered with the growth of steamboat traffic starting in 1859 and an 1862 gold strike, but declined with the advent of the railroad.
9^{#}	Fort Union Trading Post	Fort Union Trading Post	July 4, 1961 (#66000103)	Williston, North Dakota; 47°59′58″N 104°02′26″W	Richland County, North Dakota and Roosevelt County, Montana	Most important fur trading post on the upper Missouri until 1867. Visitors included John James Audubon, George Catlin, Father Pierre-Jean De Smet, Sitting Bull, Karl Bodmer, and Jim Bridger.
10	Going-to-the-Sun Road	Going-to-the-Sun Road	February 18, 1997 (#83001070)	Glacier National Park; 48°44′00″N 113°46′00″W	Flathead and Glacier	Main parkway through the heart of Glacier National Park.
11^{#}	Grant-Kohrs Ranch	Grant-Kohrs Ranch	December 19, 1960 (#72000738)	Deer Lodge; 46°24′30″N 112°44′22″W	Powell	John Grant, the original owner of the ranch, from 1853, is sometimes credited with founding the range-cattle industry in Montana. Conrad Kohrs, who bought the ranch c.1866, was among the foremost "cattle kings" of his era.
12^{†}	Great Falls Portage	Great Falls Portage	May 23, 1966 (#66000429)	Great Falls; 47°31′52″N 111°09′05″W	Cascade	The Lewis and Clark Expedition undertook an 18-mile, 31-day portage at Great Falls, one of the most difficult ordeals of their westward trip. The Great Falls Portage NHL is within Giant Springs State Park.
13^{†}	Great Northern Railway Buildings	Great Northern Railway Buildings	May 28, 1987 (#87001453)	Glacier National Park; 48°46′05″N 113°46′11″W	Flathead and Glacier	These lodges or associated buildings, dated c.1913-1915, represent European-style hostelries unique among NPS concessions. The landmark contains 5 building groups: Granite Park Chalet, Many Glacier Hotel, Sperry Chalet, Two Medicine Store, and Belton Chalet
14	Hagen Site	Hagen Site	July 19, 1964 (#66000432)	Glendive	Dawson	An archeological site representing one of the Crow villages after the tribe had split from the Hidatsa on the Missouri River (c. 1550-1675); site has evidence of horticulture and diet.
15	Lake McDonald Lodge	Lake McDonald Lodge	May 28, 1987 (#87001447)	Glacier National Park; 48°36′55″N 113°52′41″W	Flathead	A Swiss chalet-style hotel in Glacier National Park.
16	Lemhi Pass	Lemhi Pass	October 9, 1960 (#66000313)	Tendoy, ID; 44°58′29″N 113°26′41″W	Beaver- head (MT) and Lemhi, ID	See main listing under Idaho.
17	Lolo Trail	Lolo Trail	October 9, 1960 (#66000309)	Lolo Hot Springs, MT; 46°38′07″N 114°34′47″W	Missoula, MT, Clear- water, ID, and Idaho, ID	
18	Northeast Entrance Station	Northeast Entrance Station	May 28, 1987 (#87001435)	Yellowst. National Park; 45°00′10″N 110°00′33″W	Park	Rustic entrance station built in 1935 that is a prime example of form fitting function, in Yellowstone National Park.
19	Pictograph Cave	Pictograph Cave	July 19, 1964 (#66000439)	Billings; 45°44′12″N 108°25′47″W	Yellow- stone	One of the key archeological sites used in determining the sequence of prehistoric occupation on the northwestern Plains. The deposits indicate occupation from 2600 BC to after 1800 AD.
20^{#}	Pompey's Pillar	Pompey's Pillar	July 23, 1965 (#66000440)	Pompey's Pillar; 45°59′43″N 108°00′20″W	Yellow- stone	The massive natural block of sandstone was a major landmark on the Lewis and Clark Expedition. Clark's signature is carved on its surface.
21	Rankin Ranch		May 11, 1976 (#76001119)	Avalanche Gulch, north of Townsend; 46°37′46″N 111°34′11″W	Broad- water	Residence (1923–56) of Jeannette Rankin, first woman elected to U.S. House of Representatives (1916), had two terms 1917-19 & 1941-43, only member to oppose the declaration of war against Japan in 1941.
22	Rosebud Battlefield-Where the Girl Saved Her Brother	Rosebud Battlefield-Where the Girl Saved Her Brother	October 6, 2008 (#72000735)	Kirby; 45°13′17″N 106°59′21″W	Big Horn	Site of the Battle of the Rosebud
23	Charles M. Russell House and Studio	Charles M. Russell House and Studio	December 21, 1965 (#66000430)	Great Falls; 47°30′35″N 111°17′09″W	Cascade	Home and studio of artist Charles M. Russell.
24	Three Forks of the Missouri	Three Forks of the Missouri	October 9, 1960 (#66000433)	Three Forks; 45°55′39″N 111°30′18″W	Gallatin	Captain William Clark of the Lewis and Clark Expedition, first European-American to visit this spot, concluded the Missouri River originated where the Three Forks joined.
25	Travelers Rest	Travelers Rest	October 9, 1960 (#66000437)	Lolo; 46°45′00″N 114°05′20″W	Missoula	Campsite used during the westward passage of the Lewis and Clark Expedition in 1805 as the party prepared to cross the Bitterroot Mountains, and again during return passage in 1806.
26^{†}	Virginia City Historic District	Virginia City Historic District	July 4, 1961 (#66000435)	Virginia City; 45°17′37″N 111°56′41″W	Madison	More than 200 historic 19th century buildings remain in this 1860s mining town; it also served as the Montana Territorial Capitol during the same period.
27	Burton K. Wheeler House	Burton K. Wheeler House	December 8, 1976 (#76001129)	Butte; 46°00′20″N 112°31′17″W	Silver Bow	Former residence of noted Montana Senator Burton K. Wheeler.
28	Wolf Mountains Battlefield-Where Big Crow walked Back and Forth	Wolf Mountains Battlefield-Where Big Crow walked Back and Forth	October 6, 2008 (#00001617)	Birney; 45°17′18″N 106°34′53″W	Rosebud	Site of the Battle of Wolf Mountain.

== See also ==
- Historic preservation
- History of Montana
- National Register of Historic Places listings in Montana
- List of National Natural Landmarks in Montana
