= Glacier Park Company =

The Glacier Park Company, a subsidiary of the Great Northern Railway (GN), constructed and operated hotels, chalets, and other visitor facilities in Glacier National Park, Montana and Waterton Lakes National Park, Alberta from the 1910s through 1960. Operating as a concessionaire of the National Park Service, the company operated from a summer base in East Glacier Park, Montana, near the company's flagship Glacier Park Hotel; winter headquarters were in St. Paul, Minnesota. Originally known as the Glacier Park Hotel Company, the corporate name was shortened to Glacier Park Company in 1943.

During the early years of the Glacier Park Company's operation, its facilities were primarily geared to serve tourists who arrived in Glacier on the Great Northern's passenger trains, which stopped at a station adjacent to Glacier Park Hotel. From there, horse and motorcoach tours connected to the company's other hotels and chalets. The largest of the company's facilities was the Many Glacier Hotel, which opened in 1915. The landmark Prince of Wales Hotel in Waterton was completed in 1927, and in 1930 the company was contracted to operate the privately constructed Lake McDonald Hotel.

The hotels were supplemented by a network of smaller lodging complexes called "chalets," some accessible only by trail. A total of nine such properties were constructed during the 1910s, four of which survive today in whole or part: the Belton Chalets, Sperry Chalet, Granite Park Chalet and the Two Medicine Store. Two additional locations, Swiftcurrent and Rising Sun, were developed in the 1930s and 1940s to serve Glacier's increasing numbers of automobile travelers.

After the 1960 operating season, the company's Glacier and Waterton operations were sold to Don Hummel, a Tucson, Arizona businessman who formed "Glacier Park, Inc." to operate the concessions.

The Glacier Park Company continued to exist as a real estate subsidiary of the Great Northern, and later the GN's corporate successor Burlington Northern. As of 1990, it was a subsidiary of Burlington Resources.

The company is now a wholly owned subsidiary of ConocoPhillips.
