= Sprague Fire =

2017 wildfire in Glacier National Park in Montana

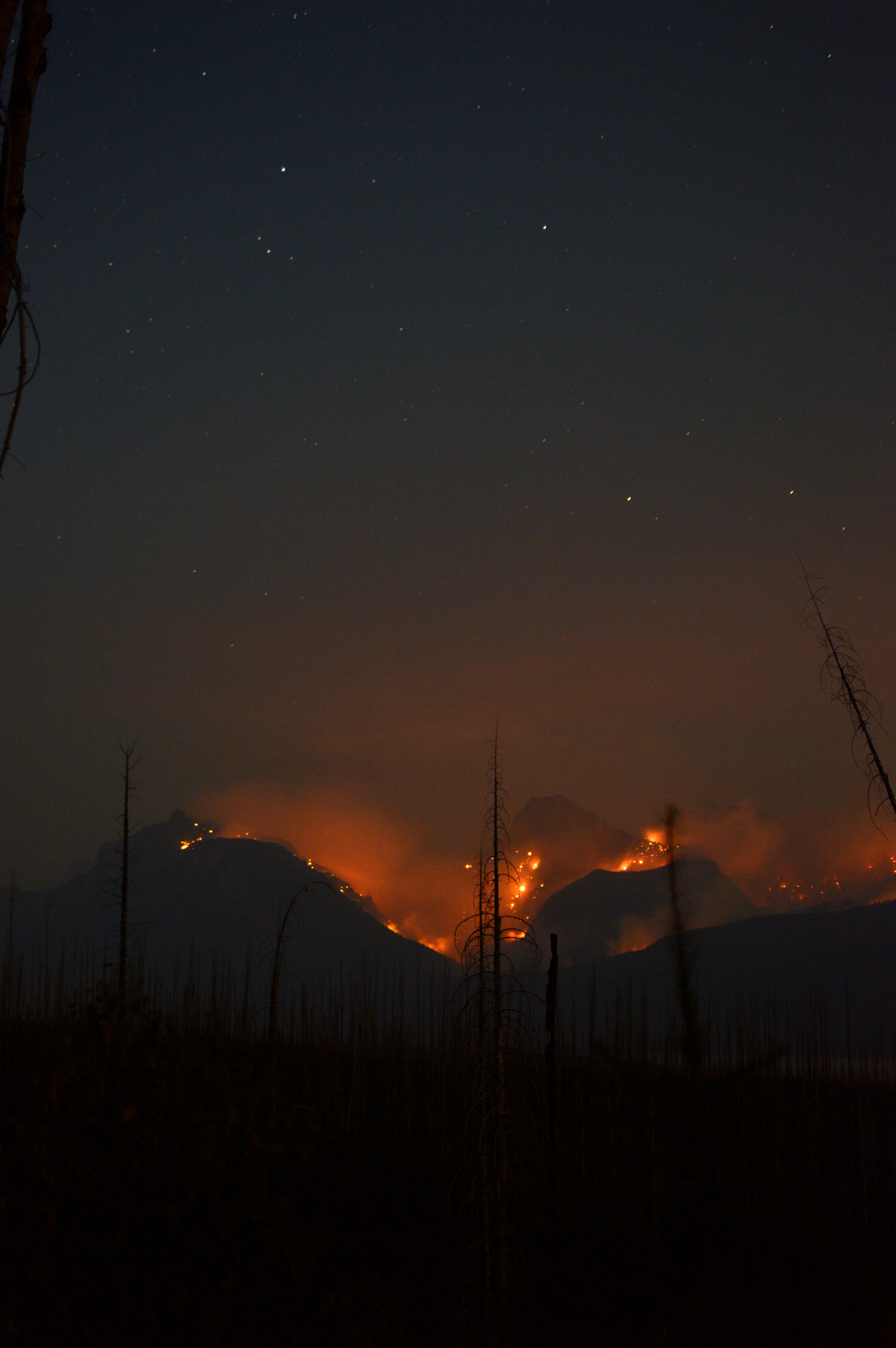
- Sprague Fire on August 31, 2017 at 1037 pm
- Date: August 10, 2017 – October 4, 2017; 8:30pm
- Location: Glacier National Park, Flathead County, Montana, United States
- Coordinates: 48.607°N 113.829°W

Statistics
- Burned area: 16,982 acres (6,872 ha)
- Land use: Forest

Impacts
- Deaths: 0
- Injuries: 0
- Structures destroyed: 1

Ignition
- Cause: Lightning

The Sprague Fire was a wildfire in Glacier National Park in Montana. It was first reported on August 10, 2017, around 8:30 pm after being caused by a lightning storm. The fire encompassed 16,982 acres (6,872 ha). It nearly destroyed the historic Sperry Chalet.

== Start and early development ==
Initially reported on August 10, 2017, on the north side of Sprague Creek, 9 mi (14 km) northeast of West Glacier, Montana, by August 15, 2017, the fire was estimated to be 100 acres (40 ha) in size and situated in steep terrain. Burning along the Gunsight Trail, the primary trail access to the Sperry Chalet, a historic backcountry lodging facility only accessible by trail, the fire forced the closing of the chalet, though the structure was not threatened at that time. The Sperry Chalet was built in 1913 by workers employed by the Great Northern Railway and is listed as on the National Register of Historic Places. It was part of the Great Northern Railway Buildings that have been listed as a National Historic Landmark.

By August 18 the fire had spread to 519 acres (210 ha) on Mount Brown and firefighters had installed an irrigation system and hose lay in the Sperry Chalet area and wrapped the historic Mount Brown Fire Lookout tower with protective fire resistant material. By August 21, Sprague Fire had spread to encompass 1,183 acres (479 ha) and was burning in a sparse vegetation zone on Lincoln Ridge. Nearly 100 firefighters had been assigned to the fire protecting structures such as Sperry Chalet with a portable pond and sprinklers and had the support of one helicopter performing water drops on hot spots. The fire assessment was that the sparse vegetation and somewhat cooler temperatures would help firefighters protect structures and that Sperry Chalet was not in imminent danger. By August 28, the fire had spread to over 1,500 acres (610 ha) and firefighters continued to reduce fuel loads in potential burn areas and to protect and monitor conditions near Sperry Chalet. However, smoke was becoming a factor with hazardous smoke levels being recorded at the facilities in and near the Lake McDonald Lodge area. Sprinkler operations were also installed near footbridges on trails.

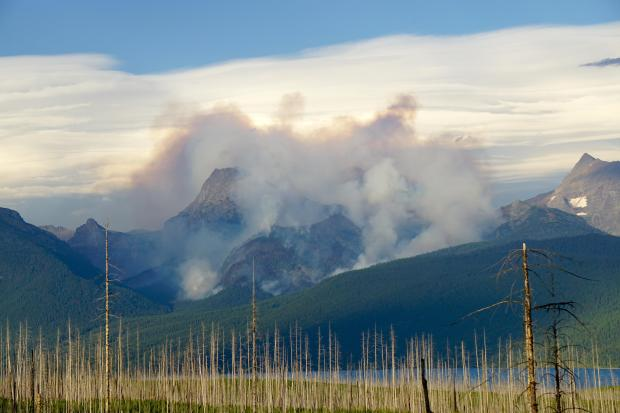
Sprague Fire on August 18, 2017

On August 30, Xanterra Parks and Resorts, the concessionaire that manages many park lodges and food establishments throughout the U.S., decided to close the Lake McDonald Lodge and surrounding food and retail facilities for the season due to hazardous smoke conditions. This was done to protect the health of their employees as well as guests. Though the fire was 2 mi (3.2 km) from the lodge complex, heavy smoke had been settling in during the evenings and lingering into the mornings, reaching the "uppermost limit of hazardous". By August 31, the fire had spread to over 2,000 acres (810 ha) but officials were confident that the highly trained firefighting personnel and fire mitigation strategies would continue to protect the structures of Sperry Chalet. A red flag warning had been posted for that day.

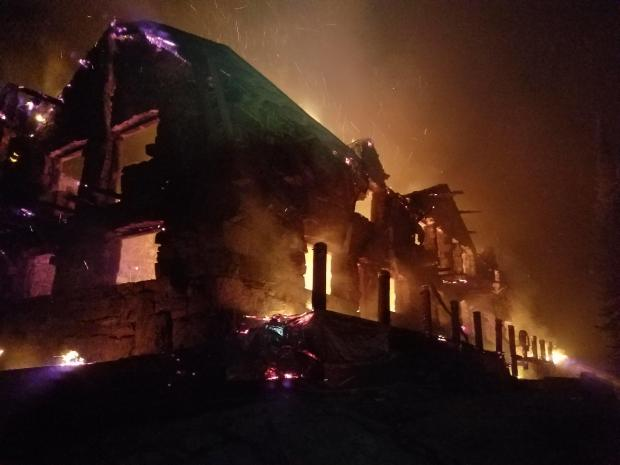
Sperry Chalet on fire on August 31st

Extreme fire conditions prevailed, with high winds and intensively dry conditions assisting the Sprague Fire in expansion to the north and east into heavy fuel zones of older growth forest and dead and dying wood. The fire doubled in size to more than 4,000 acres (1,600 ha). Firefighters fought fires nearing the Sperry Chalet and were assisted by four helicopters doing water drops, but the fire still managed to circumvent all efforts by the firefighters and gutted the main Sperry Chalet building. On Thursday, August 31, at around 6:10 PM, firefighters observed smoke originating from a roof eave and upon spraying water at the area, a window blew out and fire was seen coming out from inside the structure, indicating that fire had somehow worked its way inside the chalet. Firefighters attempted to put out the fire but were forced to abandon the effort, redirecting their resources instead to protecting other nearby structures. Fire consumed the roof and wood floors of the Sperry Chalet, leaving only the exterior stone walls still standing.

After an environmental impact statement was completed, National Park Service authorities determined that the chalet would be rebuilt using the original stone exterior and aside from some minor modifications to meet current building codes, have all the same design as the original structure. The rebuilding process was expected to last during the summers of 2018 and 2019.

== September expansion ==
Due to anticipated wind shifts from the southwest to the northeast for the night of September 3, the National Park Service issued a mandatory evacuation for much of the McDonald Valley region of the park. Fire behavior was expected to be severe and unpredictable and this, in conjunction with worsening air quality in the Lake McDonald region, led to the management decision for a mandatory evacuation. The evacuation area included public and privately held inholdings along the Going-to-the-Sun Road from the south end of Lake McDonald to Logan Pass, closing down all access to the pass from the west side of the park. As a precaution, an Interagency hotshot crew was installing sprinkler systems for Lake McDonald Lodge complex structures and historical items were being removed from the main lodge.

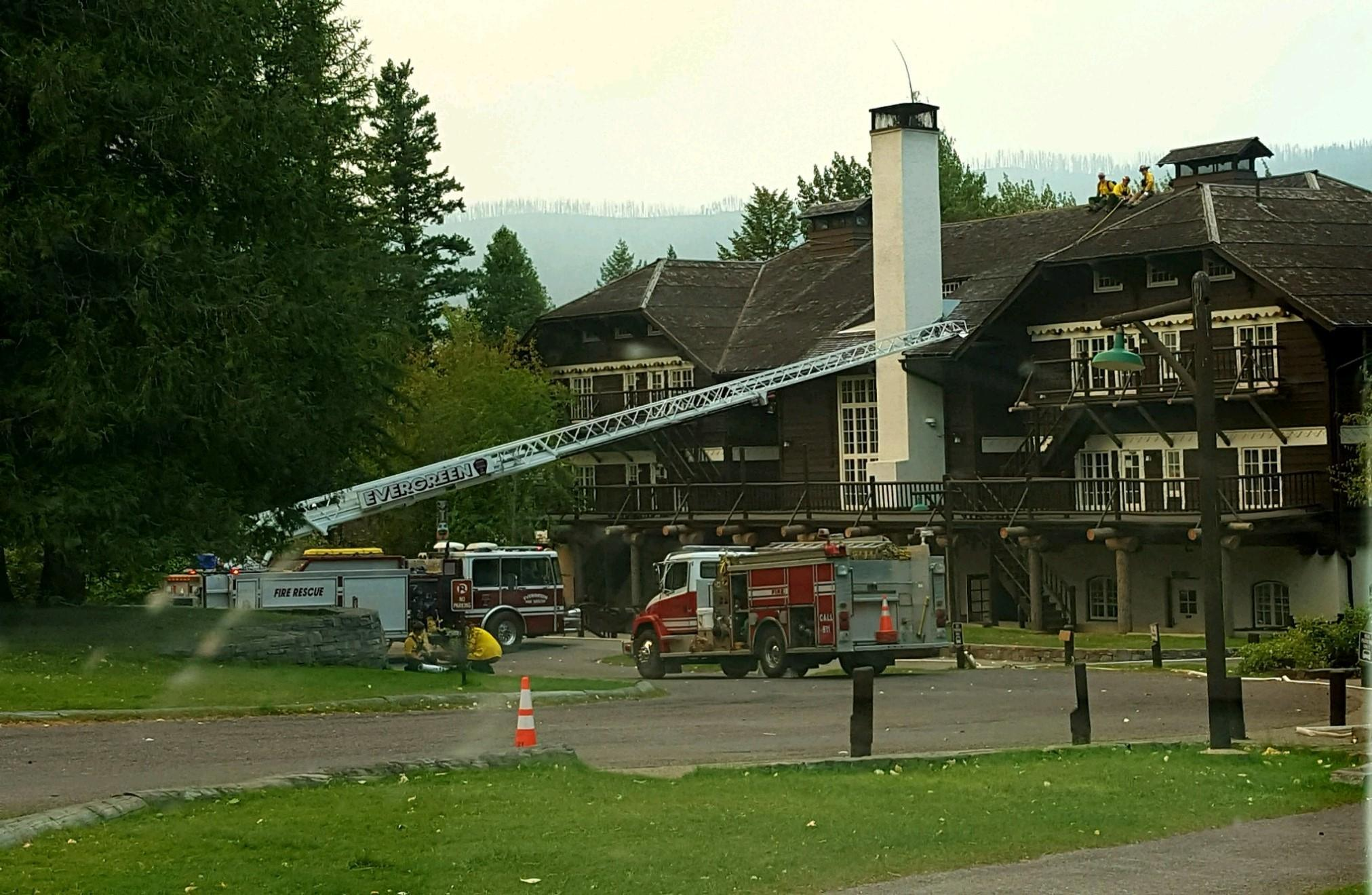
Fire engines stationed at Lake McDonald Lodge involved in structural fire protection efforts on September 4, 2017.

By the evening of September 4, the fire had spread to over 13,000 acres (5,300 ha) and was only 35 percent contained. 155 firefighters were at work on the fire and overseen by a Type II Fire Management Team. The Sprague fire had burned substantial portions of the Snyder, Sprague and Lincoln Creek drainages. Heavy smoke interfered with further fire spread by September 5 and for the next several days no increase in acreage burned was reported. The smoke was greatly impacting air quality and grounded most helicopter flights. Spot fires were still reported in the area around Sperry Chalet and firefighters continued mop up operations there and were working on installing sprinkler systems for the Lake McDonald Lodge complex. On September 8 the acreage burned was estimated at 13,245 acres (5,360 ha) and had not increased in several days due to very heavy smoke and haze dampening the spread of the fire. The Sprague Fire as well as the smaller Adair Peak Fire to the north near Logging Lake had essentially shut down most of the vehicular and trail access to the west side of the park. By September 9 a dry cold front helped to circulate some smoke out, improving visibility but also increasing the size of the fire that was listed at 13,674 acres (5,534 ha). A sprinkler system was set up at the Lake McDonald and Avalanche Creek areas in the hope that this would saturate those areas reducing the chances they would flare up should the fire spread in those directions.

Smoke conditions on September 10 improved enough to allow two aerial tankers to drop a total of 250,000 US gal (950,000 L; 210,000 imp gal) of water from Lake McDonald onto the fire. Some expansion of acreage burned was noted on September 11 to be 14,432 acres (5,840 ha) due to increasing temperatures and winds, though the fire was being forced back into previously burned areas to some degree. A new red flag warning was issued due to the increased potential for fire growth. A wind shift ahead of an advancing cold front was anticipated to increase fire activity the evening of September 13. The fire was flanking the slopes of Mount Brown and heading towards the shores of Lake McDonald and while the fire was now considered to be 60 percent contained, structure protection at various locations was ongoing. Officials at Glacier National Park and with Flathead County, Montana, issued an evacuation warning for Apgar Village at the southwestern end of Lake McDonald and portions of the adjacent community of West Glacier, Montana, to residents to be prepared to evacuate should the approaching weather system cause a sudden spread of the Sprague Fire. By September 15 the fire exceeded 15,000 acres (6,100 ha) and 167 firefighters were assigned to the fire. Much cooler temperatures were expected and light rain had commenced by the afternoon of September 14.

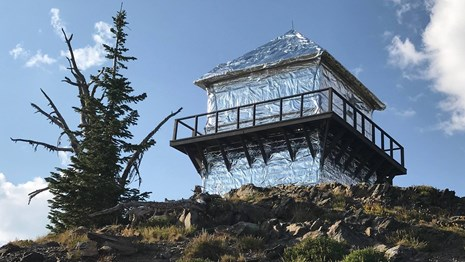
Mount Brown Fire Lookout with fire resistant wrapping installed to help it withstand the fire

The Sprague Fire continued to advance slowly towards the Going-to-the-Sun Road at the rate of approximately 100 ft (30 m) per day as reported on September 16 and a slight warming trend indicated the fire might continue to expand, albeit less rapidly than in preceding weeks. The precautionary fire evacuation warning that had been implemented for the Apgar region was therefore suspended . Light precipitation and much cooler than normal temperatures kept the Sprague Fire from expanding during the third week in September. Conditions had improved enough that officials lifted the outdoor fire burn restriction, allowing campers to once again burn campfires. By September 23, officials lifted the mandatory evacuation order for the Lake McDonald region but the Going-to-the-Sun Road remained closed to tourism due to ongoing fire activity. The fire was creeping and smoldering but no increase in burned acreage had been noticed during the third week in September. On September 28 the fire was determined by infrared flight to encompass 16,926 acres (6,850 ha). Slightly warming temperatures were expected for the last days of September, allowing the fire to possibly expand slightly. With the arrival of October, snow was expected throughout Glacier National Park, and the fire was deemed to no longer pose a threat to most structures, particularly those in the Lake McDonald complex, so firefighters busied themselves removing, "55,000 feet of hose, 24 Mark III pumps, 270 sprinklers and 6 portable water tanks".

Visiting the fire on September 16, U.S. Secretary of the Interior Ryan Zinke stated that rebuilding the Sperry Chalet would be a top priority and an engineering firm had already inspected the structure and was preparing a proposal on how to reinforce the remaining stone walls for the upcoming winter and other stabilization efforts. A fund for stabilization was established and was being overseen by the Glacier National Park Conservancy. The fundraiser exceeded the target goals in a matter of weeks. Work to brace the stone walls to prevent their collapse was scheduled to begin in October 2017, with supplies brought in by helicopter.

== Containment ==
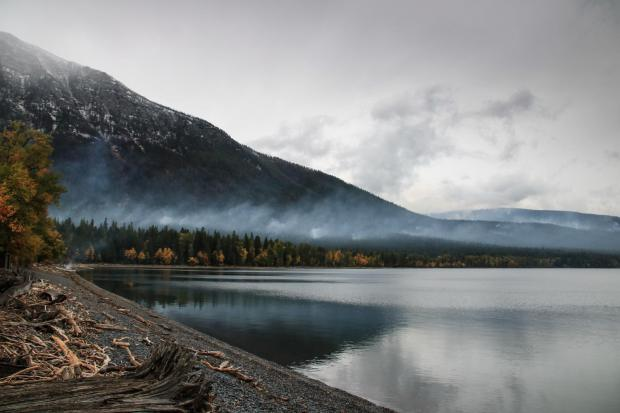
Sprague Fire continues to smolder on October 2, 2017

With the arrival of October, a combination of factors such as cooler temps, light snow and shorter days led to a vastly reduced fire threat and the Sprague Fire was 75 percent contained by the beginning of the month. Officials ceased providing regular updates due to the relaxed risk of further fire expansion and firefighters worked breaking down the water pumping operations set up in the Lake McDonald region that had supplied water for the sprinkler systems and return the equipment to regional fire caches. The fire was to be monitored by visual observation from roads and trails and with occasional aerial reconnaissance flights. The fire was anticipated to continue to produce smoke from smoldering logs and not to be fully out until lasting snows arrived later in the year. Full containment of the fire was not anticipated until November 1, 2017.
