= Lake McDonald (disambiguation) =

Lake McDonald may mean:

== Lakes ==
- Lake McDonald, a lake in Glacier National Park, Montana, United States
- McDonald Lake (Idaho), a glacial lake in Custer County, Idaho, United States
- McDonald Lake (Nova Scotia), a lake in Richmond County, Nova Scotia, Canada
- McDonald Lake (Saskatchewan), a lake in Saskatchewan, Canada, created when the Rafferty Dam was built in 1994

== Buildings ==
- Lake McDonald Lodge, a lodge in Glacier National Park, Montana, United States
- Lake McDonald Lodge Coffee Shop, a building in Glacier National Park, Montana, United States

== Communities ==
- Lake Macdonald, Queensland, a suburb of the Sunshine Coast, Queensland, Australia
- Lake McDonald, Montana, a community in the United States
