= Adair Peak Fire =

2017 wildfire in Montana, US

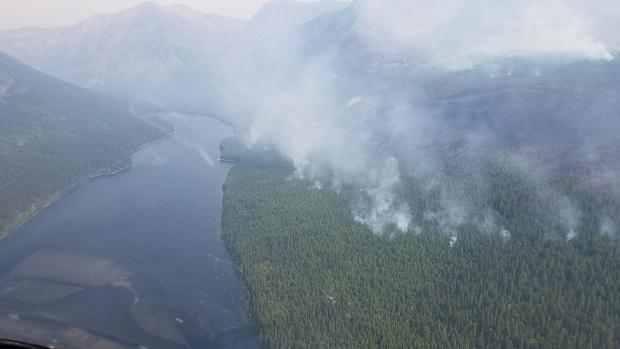
- Adair Peak Fire on September 10, 2017 burning timber near south shore on Logging Lake
- Date: August 12, 2017 – November 1, 2017; 10:17 AM PST
- Location: Glacier National Park, Flathead County, Montana, United States
- Coordinates: 48.758°N 114.04°W

Statistics
- Burned area: 4,074 acres (1,649 ha)
- Land use: Forest

Ignition
- Cause: Lightning

The Adair Peak Fire was a wildfire in Glacier National Park in the U.S. state of Montana and was first reported on August 12, 2017 around 10:17 AM after it was caused by a lightning storm over the region that occurred several days before it was first spotted. The Adair Peak Fire encompassed 4,074 acres (1,649 ha). The fire forced the closure of the North Fork Road from the Polebridge Ranger Station south to Camas Creek as well as the Logging Creek and Quartz Creek campgrounds. Structure protection was performed at the Lower Logging Lake Snowshoe Cabin and Boathouse by a small firefighting crew that wrapped the structures with a fire resistant sheeting. The fire was started by the same dry lightning storm that ignited the Sprague Fire near Lake McDonald that destroyed the Sperry Chalet on August 31.

After a period of heavy smoke and haze which kept the fire from spreading for a number of days in early September, by the 10th the fire became more active again with crown fires and torching along the northwest slope of Wolf Gun Mountain. On September 14, light rain and much cool temperatures had arrived at the fire which was reported to be over 3,000 acres (1,200 ha) in size but burning slowly. Cooler temperatures as well as snow prevented the fire from expanding into early October and the Adair Peak Fire was no longer monitored directly by firefighters.
