= St. Mary Utility Area Historic District =

Historic district in Montana, United States

- U.S. National Register of Historic Places
- U.S. Historic district
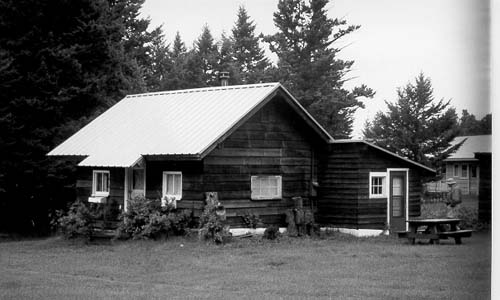

- Location within Montana Location within the United States
- Location: E of St. Mary at Divide Creek, Glacier NP, St. Mary, Montana
- Coordinates: 48°44′17″N 113°25′45″W
- Built: 1937
- Architect: National Park Service; Civilian Conservation Corps
- MPS: Glacier National Park MPS
- NRHP reference No.: 95001576
- Added to NRHP: January 19, 1996

The St. Mary Utility Area Historic District comprises a support area of Glacier National Park with employee housing and support buildings in the prevailing National Park Service Rustic style. The complex was built by Civilian Conservation Corps labor to replace the administrative facilities at East Glacier Ranger Station in a location more convenient to the new Going-to-the-Sun Road. The majority of development occurred between 1933 and 1941. Buildings include maintenance buildings, an oil house, a dormitory and barns. The area is surrounded by residences, not included in the district, built during the Mission 66 program and later.

A ranger station was established in the area in 1913. A mess hall was built by 1925 to serve trail and road crews. With the completion of the Going-to-the-Sun Road in 1933, the administrative facilities were expanded to complement the main administrative headquarters on the west side of the park.

== See also ==
- Saint Mary Visitor Center, Entrance Station and Checking Stations
