= Cecil J. Doty =

American architect

- Born: 1907
- Died: 1990 (aged 82–83)
- Education: Oklahoma A&M
- Occupation: Architect
- Practice: Civilian Conservation Corps
- Buildings: White Sands National Monument
- Projects: Mission 66
- Design: Alcan Highway

Cecil John Doty (1907–1990) was an American architect, notable for planning a consistent architectural framework for the U.S. National Park Service's ambitious Mission 66 program in the 1950s and 1960s. Doty spent his childhood in May, Oklahoma, then attended Oklahoma A&M (now Oklahoma State University), and received a degree in architectural engineering in 1928. During the Great Depression that immediately followed Doty's graduation, Doty found intermittent work, but was unable to establish a business in Oklahoma City. In order to make a living, Doty signed up with the Civilian Conservation Corps, first as a file clerk, then as an architect in the state parks program.

Doty was hired by Park Service design director Herbert Maier to complete plans for a museum building at Glacier National Park, and absorbed Maier's style by studying the design guidelines issued by Maier, which contained prototype designs executed by Maier and Park Service staff for national and state parks. By January 1935, Doty was promoted to associate engineer and given responsibility, together with landscape architect Harvey Cornell, for the state parks of Kansas and Oklahoma. The next year he became regional architect, and in 1937 moved to Santa Fe, New Mexico to work with Maier at the new regional office, where he took up work on national park structures. Doty designed his new workplace, the Santa Fe Regional Office, while still in Oklahoma, completing the design after moving to Santa Fe.

Doty moved to the San Francisco Office in 1940, where he took on work for the new White Sands National Monument. During World War II Doty worked on major war effort projects like the Alcan Highway and Shasta Dam. Following the war in 1946 he became the Park Service's regional architect in 1948. He designed the lodge at Hurricane Ridge in Olympic National Park and the Joshua Tree National Park administration building. In 1954 Doty joined the Western Office of Design and Construction, where he assumed a leadership role in the Mission 66 project.

Doty spent some of his post-Mission 66 time with the park service on projects at the National Mall in Washington. retiring in 1968. He lived in Walnut Creek, California in the 1980s.

== Works ==
- National Park Service Southwest Regional Office, 1937
- Visitor Center, Grand Canyon National Park, 1955
- Visitor Center, Carlsbad Caverns National Park
- Visitor Center, Colorado National Monument Visitor Center Complex, Colorado National Monument Fruita, Colorado, listed on the National Register of Historic Places
- Visitor Center, Zion National Park, with Cannon and Mullen, 1957–58
- Visitor Center, Bryce Canyon National Park, with Cannon and Mullen, 1957–58
- Visitor Center, Wupatki National Monument, with Lescher and Mahoney
- Visitor Center, Organ Pipe Cactus National Monument, with Lescher and Mahoney
- Visitor Center, Canyon de Chelly National Monument
- Madison Junction Visitor Center, Yellowstone National Park (demolished)
- Visitor Center, Mount Rushmore National Memorial (demolished)
- Visitor Center, Montezuma Castle National Monument, 1958
- Furnace Creek Visitor Center, Death Valley National Park, 1959
- Hoh Visitor Center, Olympic National Park
- Visitor Center, Sunset Crater National Monument
- Visitor Center, Curecanti National Recreation Area
- Visitor Center, Tonto National Monument
- Visitor Center, Navajo National Monument
- Visitor Center, Walnut Canyon National Monument
- Flamingo Marina, Everglades National Park, 1958
- Visitor Center, Glen Canyon National Recreation Area, 1963–1964
- Visitor Center, Natural Bridges National Monument, 1964
- Hurricane Ridge Visitor Center, Olympic National Park, 1964
- Logan Pass Visitor Center, Going-to-the-Sun Rd., 18 mi. W. of US 89, Saint Mary, Montana, listed on the National Register of Historic Places
- Visitor Center, Capulin Volcano National Monument, 1963
