= National Park Service Southwest Regional Office =

- U.S. National Register of Historic Places
- U.S. National Historic Landmark
- NM State Register of Cultural Properties
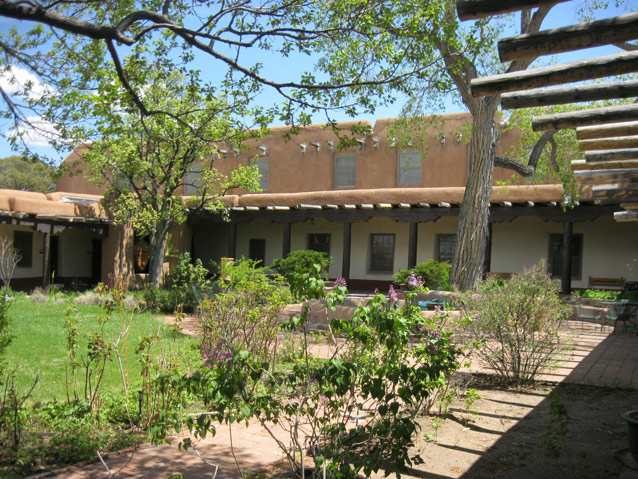

- Location within New Mexico Location within the United States
- Location: 1100 Old Santa Fe Trail, Santa Fe, New Mexico
- Coordinates: 35°40′1″N 105°55′21″W
- Area: 8 acres (3.2 ha)
- Built: 1939
- Built by: Civilian Conservation Corps, Et al.
- Architect: Cecil Doty
- Architectural style: Mission, Spanish Revival
- NRHP reference No.: 70000067
- NMSRCP No.: 144

Significant dates
- Added to NRHP: October 6, 1970
- Designated NHL: May 28, 1987
- Designated NMSRCP: May 21, 1971

The National Park Service Southwest Regional Office, also known as National Park Service Region III Headquarters Building, is located at 1100 Old Santa Fe Trail in Santa Fe, New Mexico. The office provides support services for Park Service properties throughout the intermountain region of the American Southwest. The building, designed by NPS architect Cecil J. Doty, it is a traditional adobe building, built the 1930s by crews of the Civilian Conservation Corps. It is the largest adobe office building in the nation, and a masterpiece of Spanish Pueblo Revival architecture. It was designated a National Historic Landmark in 1987. It is open to the public during normal business hours; tours are not normally given.

== Architecture and history ==
In the early 1930s, the United States National Park Service was reorganized in anticipation of an increase in the number of parks the service would have to manage. A need for a centralized office for the southwest region was identified at that time, resulting in the design and construction of this building in the 1930s. It was designed in 1937 by Park Service architect Cecil Doty, who chose the Spanish Pueblo Revival. It was built by crews of the Civilian Conservation Corps with funding from the Works Progress Administration. They formed the bricks for the walls on site, and also constructed some of the furnishings, which were also designed by Doty. The building is at 24,000 square feet (2,200 m^{2}) the largest known adobe office building, emulating in its style and layout the forms of traditional adobe architecture common to the region.

The office is located in a somewhat rural setting southeast of downtown Santa Fe, on the south side of Old Santa Fe Trail at its junction with Camino del Montel Sol, and just north of Santa Fe's major museum district. It is organized in the form of a traditional mission compound, with a central patio. The main wing on the east side of the patio is two stories in height, and is where the main entrance and lobby space are located. The walls, built out of adobe and finished in cement stucco, vary in thickness between 4.9 feet (1.5 m) and 3 feet (0.91 m). The main lobby space has flagstone floors, while more functional areas of the building have carpeted concrete floors.

== See also ==
- National Register of Historic Places listings in Santa Fe County, New Mexico
- List of National Historic Landmarks in New Mexico
