= Glacier Park Lodge =

Hotel in Montana

Coordinates: 48°26′34″N 113°13′22″W

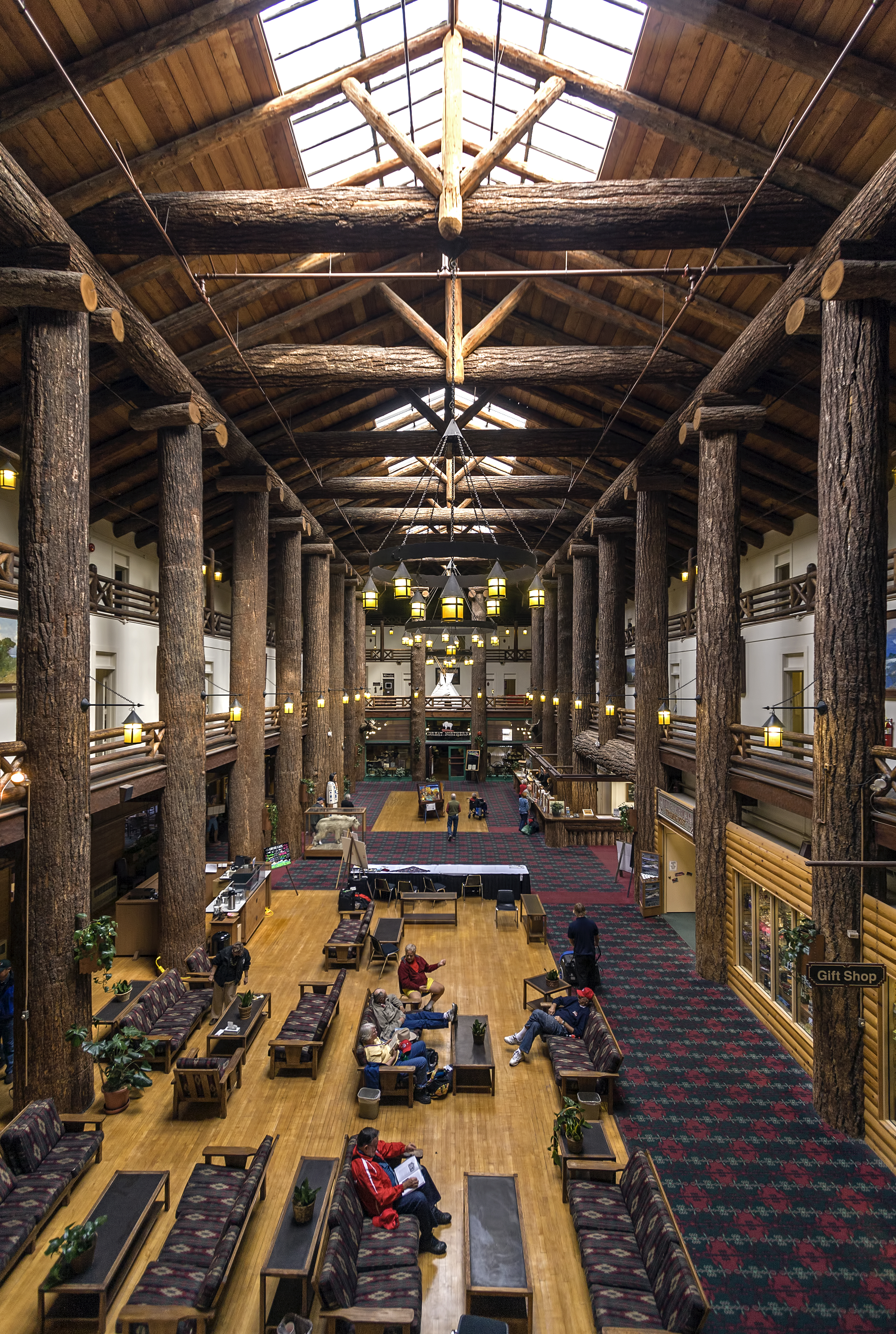
Lobby of Glacier Park Lodge

Glacier Park Lodge is located just outside the boundaries of Glacier National Park in the village of East Glacier Park, Montana, United States. The lodge was built in 1913 by the Glacier Park Company, a subsidiary of the Great Northern Railway. It was the first of a series of hotels built in and near Glacier National Park by the Great Northern to house visitors brought to the park by the railroad.

== History ==
Louis W. Hill, President of the Great Northern Railway and son of James J. Hill developed the Glacier Park lodges as part of his plan to upgrade Great Northern passenger services and compete more effectively with the rival Northern Pacific and Union Pacific Railroads, whose proximity to Yellowstone National Park provided a major attraction for tourists along those routes. Hill lobbied Congress for the designation of national park status for Glacier Park, which they approved in 1910. The railroad then began building Glacier Park Lodge, the first of several Great Northern lodges in the Park. Hill marketed the Park as an "American Alps", and many of the facilities were developed like Swiss alpine hotels.

The lodge is located at the foot of the Rocky Mountain Front, where the Great Northern begins its climb over the Lewis Range via Marias Pass from the east. This was a natural stopping place for visitors to Glacier. The lodge was sited directly opposite the railroad depot, within walking distance. Work began in April 1912 and was completed in 15 months. Demand was so great that work began immediately on an expansion that almost doubled capacity, completed in 1914.

== Design ==
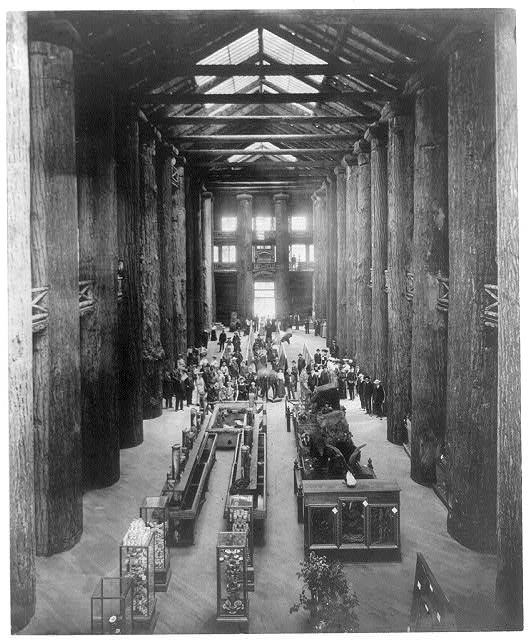
Forestry Building at the Lewis and Clark Centennial Exposition

The Great Northern commissioned Samuel L. Bartlett of St. Paul, Minnesota as the architect for the Glacier Park Lodge, but Hill controlled every major aspect of the design, having temporarily stepped down from the presidency of the Great Northern to oversee the Glacier hotel projects. Hill bought 160 acres (65 ha) of land belonging to the Blackfeet Indian Reservation at what was then known as Midvale after a special act of Congress in 1912 granted him negotiating rights. The Lodge was based on the Forestry Building at the 1905 Lewis and Clark Centennial Exposition in Portland, Oregon. Both Hill and his father had admired the forestry building and duplicated its grand hall with a 48-foot (15 m) high log colonnade, each log with its bark still attached.

Glacier Park Lodge was intended to be a signature building. The lodge is built around a three-story lobby measuring 200 feet (61 m) by 100 feet (30 m), lined with Douglas-fir columns 40 feet (12 m) tall and between 36 and 42 inches (91 to 106 cm) in diameter. Each column was brought in by rail from the Pacific Northwest because trees in Montana rarely grow so large. A total of 60 such trees were used, with Douglas-fir in the lobby and cedars for the exterior. The logs in the main hall are detailed with smaller logs at their tops to resemble the Ionic order. The lodge was loosely styled as a Swiss chalet akin to other lodges built by the Great Northern between 1913 and 1917. The original structure contained 61 guest rooms, the lobby and the dining room. The addition housed another 111 guests.

== Construction and arrangement ==
The huge timber for the hotel arrived at the site by rail in April 1912, specially cut before the sap had risen in the trees to ensure that the bark stayed attached. The contractor was Evensta & Company of Minneapolis, who used a siding from the main line to deliver the materials directly to the site. Hill chose the decor and accessories. Over time most of the furnishings have disappeared and the lobby floor has been rearranged. A lounge on the west side looks out onto the mountains, fronted by an outside veranda. Another lounge is in the basement in a space that once housed a small swimming pool. The addition is a four-story structure to the south of the main building, connected by an enclosed breezeway with intimate seating areas. The final cost of the lodge and addition by 1915 was $500,000.

The exterior of the main lodge features a log-columned portico covered by a shed roof, itself with a long shed dormer. The porch is flanked by projecting gabled bays, with each story projecting beyond the story below, capped by a broad roof with deep eaves in a chalet-like style. The lodge is clad in sawn clapboard siding with log detailing. The addition is of nearly equal size to the main lodge, at a slightly lower elevation. It features projecting bays with three story log balconies, covered by broad hooded gables.

A nine-hole golf course is a part of the lodge complex and was added in 1928, becoming the first golf course in the state of Montana. In 1960 the railroad divested itself of the hotels, selling them to Glacier Park, Inc, then operated by Donald Hummel. Hummel sold the company to the Dial Corporation in 1981, which spun off the Viad Corporation in 1996 as the operating company. The lodge is only open during the summer months between late May and the latter half of September.

Amtrak still markets the park as a tourist destination for its Empire Builder passenger train, and many of Glacier National Park visitors still arrive by train. Once common among many National Park railroad tour destinations, the Glacier Park lodges are among the last with a real railroad connection.

The lodge stands immediately adjacent to the national park on private land. Although it has not been placed on either the National Register of Historic Places or the list of National Historic Landmarks despite being clearly eligible, other examples of the Great Northern Railway Buildings such as the Many Glacier Hotel have received historic designations.

== See also ==
- Lake McDonald Lodge, the third of the major Glacier hotels, after the Glacier Park Lodge and the Many Glacier Hotel.
