= Mount Brown (Flathead County, Montana) =

Mountain in Montana, United States

- From the southwest

Highest point
- Elevation: 8,569 ft (2,612 m)
- Prominence: 1,365 ft (416 m)
- Coordinates: 48°38′18″N 113°49′04″W

Geography
- Location within Montana Location within the United States
- Location: Flathead County, Montana, U.S.
- Parent range: Lewis Range
- Topo map(s): USGS Mount Cannon, MT

Mount Brown (8,569 feet (2,612 m)) is located in the Lewis Range, Glacier National Park in the U.S. state of Montana.

There are conflicting claims about who Mount Brown was named after. A US Park Service publication states it was: "named for William Brown of Chicago, then Solicitor General for the Chicago and Alton Railroad, by some members of his party on a camping and fishing trip to the area around Lake McDonald in 1894. The companions, Charles H. Russell (not the artist) and Frank A. Johnson, climbed this mountain that arose back of their camp, and so named it." However this naming story does not explain how the campers were able make their naming decision known to the public. The 1929 US Geographic Board decision card states that the Board accepted the name Mount Brown in accordance with existing local usage, and states that it was probably named for Louis Brown, a Montana pioneer.

Below the summit on the southwestern slopes of Mount Brown is the historic Mount Brown Fire Lookout which was built in 1928 and is listed on the National Register of Historic Places.

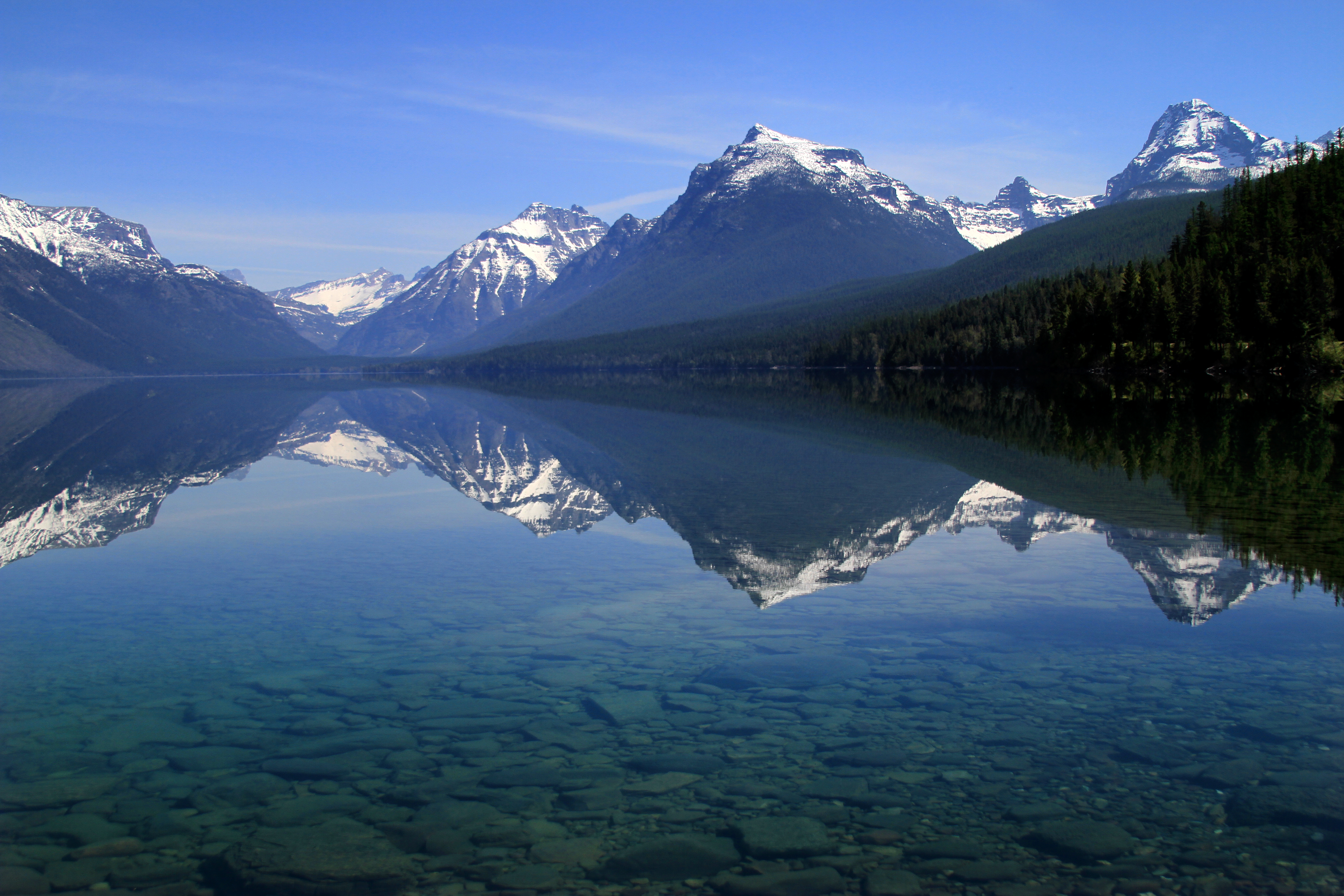
Mount Brown (right of center) reflected in Lake McDonald

The summit as seen from the southwest.

The summit of Mount Brown
360° view from the summit of Mount Brown. The center of the image is true north.

== See also ==
- Mountains and mountain ranges of Glacier National Park (U.S.)
