= Rankin Ranch =

Historic house in Montana, United States

- U.S. National Register of Historic Places
- U.S. National Historic Landmark
- Location within Montana Location within the United States
- Location: 2 1/2 mi. NE of the Helena-Diamond City Rd., north of Townsend, Montana
- Coordinates: 46°37′46″N 111°34′10.7″W
- Area: 90 acres (36 ha)
- Built: 1923
- Architect: Flouree, Dan
- NRHP reference No.: 76001119

Significant dates
- Added to NRHP: May 11, 1976
- Designated NHL: May 11, 1976

The Rankin Ranch is a historic ranch off Montana Highway 284, north of Townsend in rural Broadwater County, Montana. A National Historic Landmark, it was a longtime summer residence of Jeannette Rankin (1880-1973), whose 1916 election to the United States House of Representatives made her the first woman elected to the House. Her legacy includes her advocacy for pacifism, women's rights, and social reform. She served another term from 1941 to 1943 when she was the only member of the House to oppose the declaration of war against Japan in 1941. A small portion of the ranch was designated a National Historic Landmark and listed on the National Register of Historic Places in 1976.

== Description and history ==
The Rankin Ranch is located on the southwestern flank of the Big Belt Mountains, between Montana Highway 284 and Helena National Forest. The ranch consists of about 14,000 acres (57 km^{2}) of land, most of which is open prairie. The ranch complex is located on Avalanche Gulch Road, a county road providing access to the national forest, just southwest of the national forest boundary, and is screened by a number of trees. The main house is a modest single-story clapboarded frame structure. The front facade, facing roughly west, is set behind a recessed porch supported by fieldstone posts. The interior, of the house, and the accompanying ranch outbuildings, are not architecturally distinguished.

The ranch house is believed to have been built in 1923 by Dan Flouree, the same year the initial 2,000-acre (810 ha) parcel of the ranch was purchased by Wellington Rankin, brother of Jeannette Rankin. This ranch became the regular summer home for Jeanette from then until 1956. Of all of the places she lived, it is the place where she spent the most of her time during the height of her political influence. Elected in 1916 to the United States House of Representatives, she was the first woman elected to Congress. She was a strong pacificist, opposing American entry into both World War I and World War II; in 1941, she was the only member of Congress to oppose the war declaration after the December Attack on Pearl Harbor. She was a supporter of socially progressive legislation, working to secure women's suffrage.

An area of 90 acres (36 ha) surrounding the homestead was designated a National Historic Landmark in 1976, in recognition of Rankin's historic role.

== See also ==
- List of National Historic Landmarks in Montana
- National Register of Historic Places listings in Broadwater County, Montana
