= Two Medicine Store =

Historic building in Montana, U.S.

- Two Medicine General Store
- U.S. National Register of Historic Places
- U.S. National Historic Landmark District – Contributing property
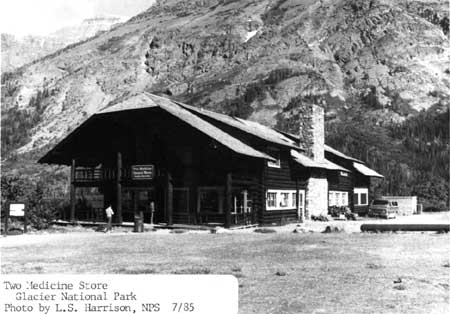
- Two Medicine Store

- Location within Montana Location within the United States
- Nearest city: West Glacier, Montana
- Coordinates: 48°29′5.8″N 113°22′8.3″W
- Built: 1912
- Part of: Great Northern Railway Buildings (ID87001453)
- MPS: Glacier National Park MRA
- NRHP reference No.: 86000372

Significant dates
- Added to NRHP: February 14, 1986
- Designated NHLDCP: May 28, 1987

Two Medicine Store, formerly part of Two Medicine Chalets, is a historic building in Glacier National Park in the U.S. state of Montana. The chalet was originally built in 1914 by the Glacier Park Hotel Company, a subsidiary of the Great Northern Railway, as part of the railway's extensive program of visitor services development at Glacier. The chalet group originally featured a complex of log buildings, all built in the rustic style, which provided dining and lodging facilities. Overnight accommodations at the chalet ended with the onset of World War II, and the other buildings at the site were intentionally burned in 1956.

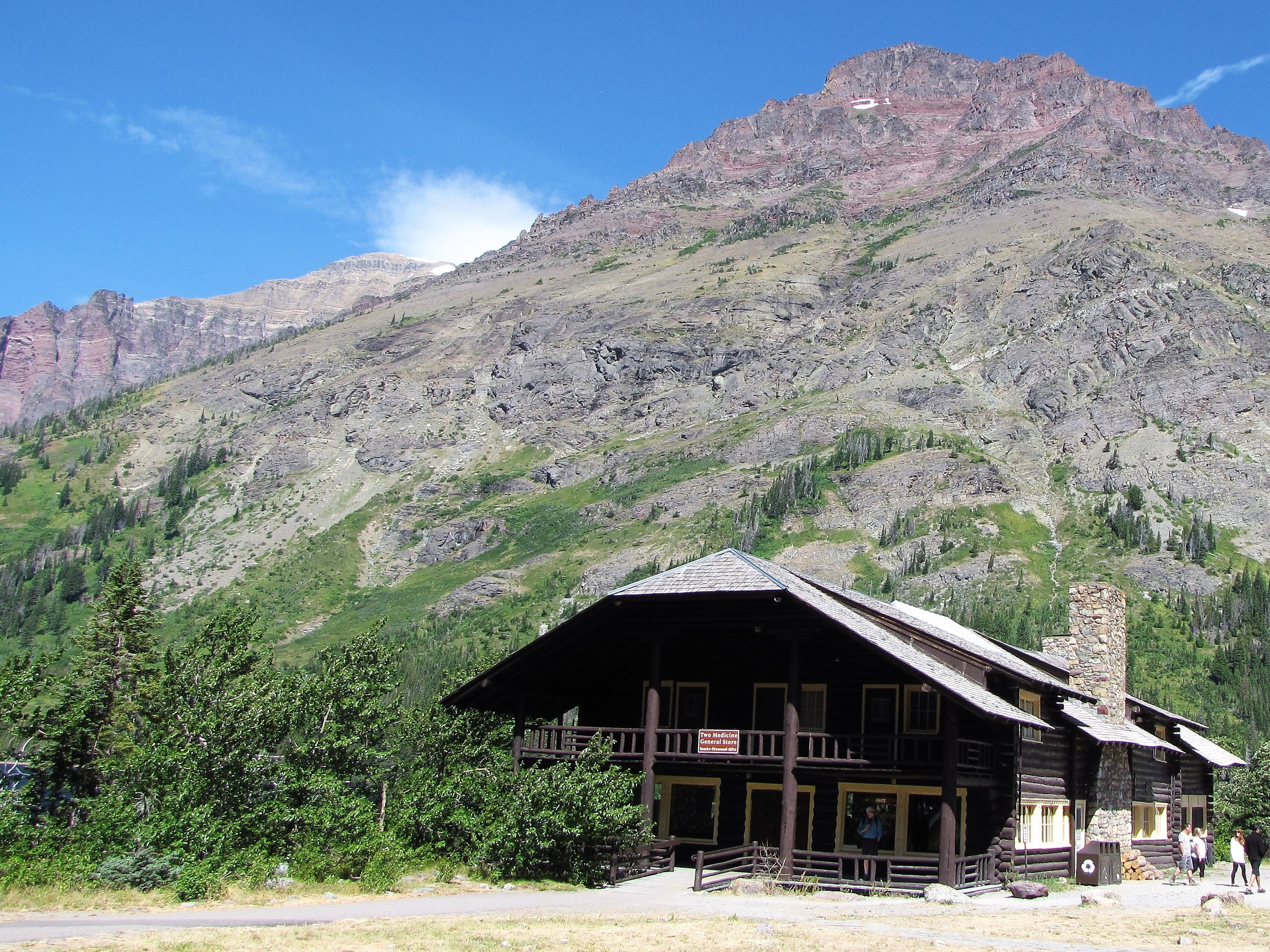
Two Medicine Store in July 2017

President Franklin D. Roosevelt gave a national radio address from Two Medicine Chalets on August 5, 1934, while on a visit to Glacier.

The Two Medicine Store is a National Historic Landmark contributing property, being one of five sites in the Great Northern Railway Buildings National Historic Landmark. While other chalets, Granite Park Chalet and Sperry Chalet, were constructed of stone, the Two Medicine Chalet complex was of log construction.
