= Lake McDonald Lodge Coffee Shop =

- U.S. National Register of Historic Places
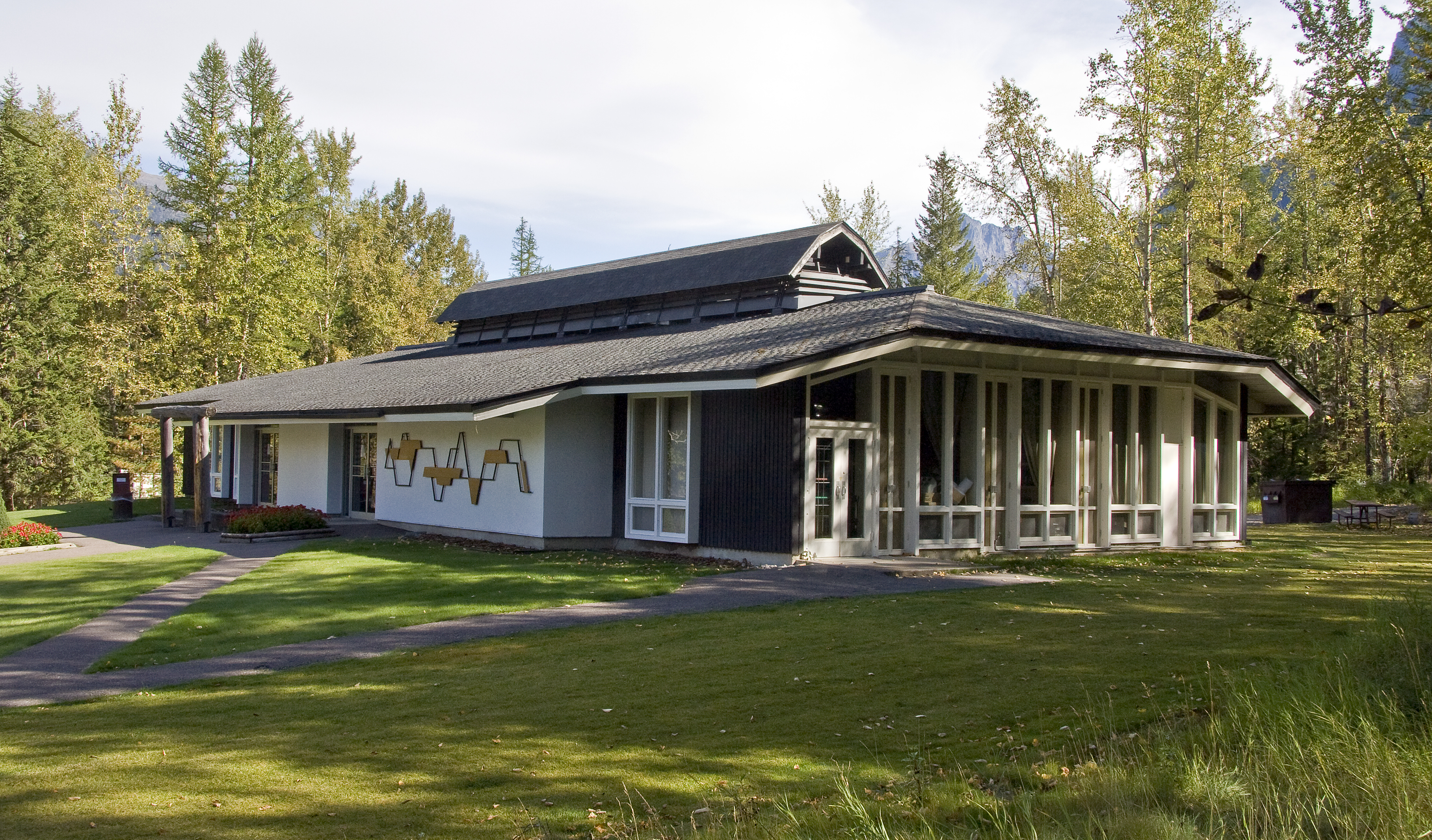

- Location within Montana Location within the United States
- Location: Lake McDonald Lodge Blvd., Lake McDonald, Glacier National Park, Montana
- Coordinates: 48°37′03.56″N 113°52′35.02″W
- Area: 1.7 acres (0.69 ha)
- Built: 1965
- Architect: Brinkman and Lenon
- Architectural style: Modern Movement, Formalism
- NRHP reference No.: 08001014
- Added to NRHP: October 14, 2008

The Lake McDonald Lodge Coffee Shop is a visitor services building in the Lake McDonald district of Glacier National Park, Montana. The coffee shop was built in 1965 as part of the National Park Service's Mission 66 program to upgrade visitor facilities, in order to increase visitor dining capacity. Under the Mission 66 projects, visitor facilities were usually comprehensive in nature, providing a range of visitor services. Specialized concession buildings like the Coffee Shop were unusual in Mission 66. It was leased to the Glacier Park Company for operation, in anticipation of the construction of lodging facilities by the company.

The Coffee Shop was designed by Burt L. Gewalt of the Kalispell, Montana architectural firm of Brinkman and Lenon. Gewalt designed the roofline to echo individual design elements of the nearby Lake McDonald Lodge, using compatible paint and trim materials.

== Description ==
The Coffee House is located a little to the east of the Lake McDonald Lodge, between the Lodge and the Going-to-the-Sun Road. The 40-foot (12 m) by 100-foot (30 m) rectangular one-story shop is set on a small hill, surrounded by a lawn with mature conifers shading the site. The building is clad in white stucco over plywood and battened cedar panels. The roof structure is composed of glued laminated timber frames on steel columns, supporting a modified hipped roof. The roof is the building's most significant detail, with clipped ends to echo the main lodge structure, and a louvered roof monitor along the ridge, designed to conceal ventilation equipment in an open roof well. The present monitor has been modified from the original cap structure, which did not cope well with the heavy snow loads at the site. The eaves extend from the building at either end. The stucco panels near the entrance feature metal sculpture designed by Gewalt to express the surrounding mountains.

The interior is arranged with the main dining room in the north end, the kitchen in the middle, and the employees' dining room at the south end. A lunch counter was originally located next to the main entrance near the center of the building. The employees' dining room has been converted to office and storage use. Interior finishes were stained cedar batten panels and vinyl asbestos tile, with an open ceiling space. Original light fixtures by A.W. Pistol remain.

Gewalt drew his design inspiration from the lodge building and from Welton Becket's design for the Canyon Village Lodge at Yellowstone National Park. Gewalt's design has been compared to the "Coffee Shop Modern" style by author Alan Hess, using many of the same structural effects and transparent design elements, as well as conspicuously modern design features. Hess describes Coffee Shop Modern as an offshoot of Googie architecture.

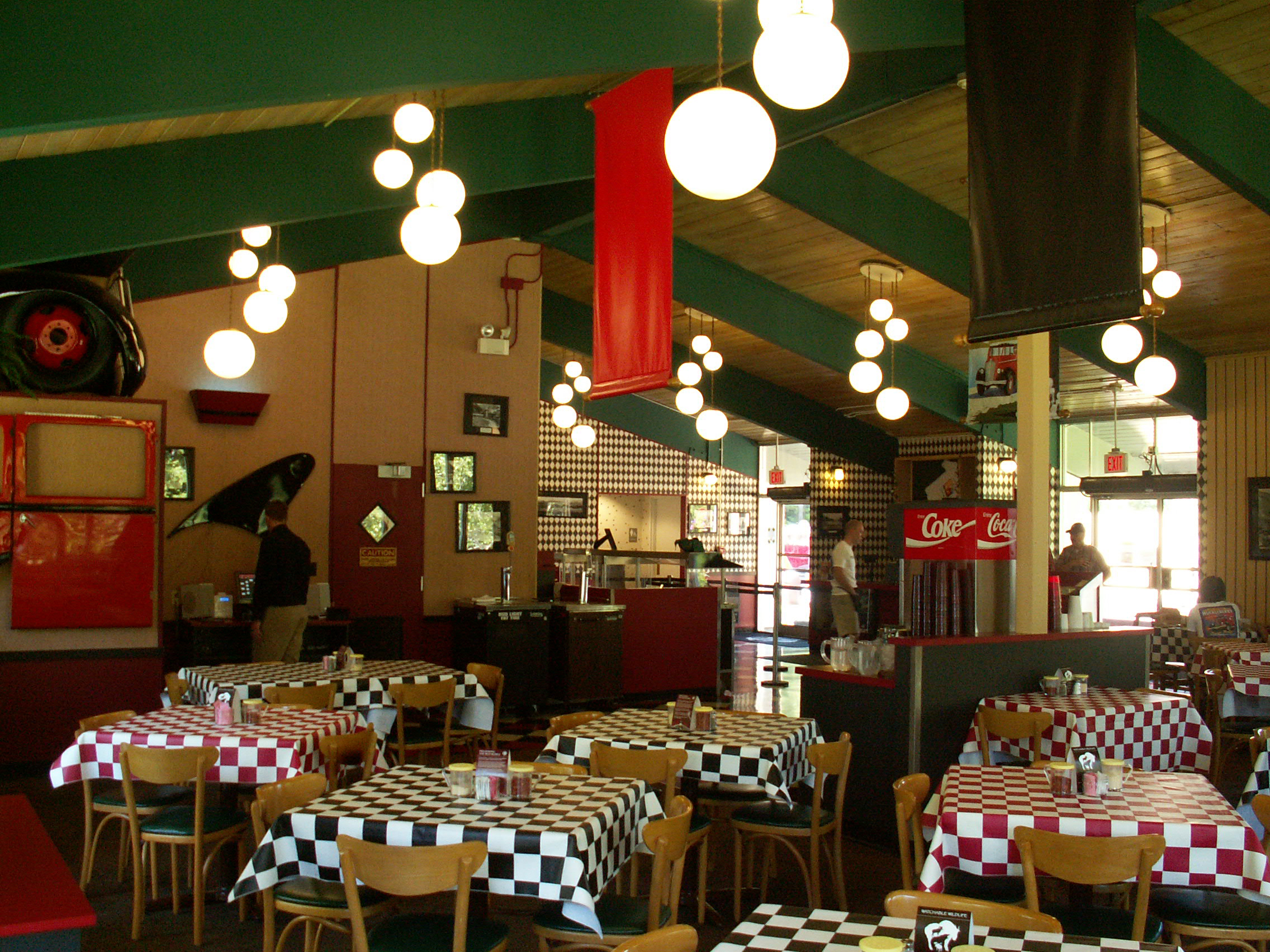
Interior of the Coffee Shop with original light fixtures

== Architects and contractors ==
Brinkman and Lenon was founded shortly after World War II, continuing after the death of the founding partners in 1961 until the firm was sold to the Architects Design Group in the 1990s. The firm designed the Logan Pass Visitor Center and the Saint Mary Visitor Center, Entrance Station and Checking Stations at the eastern side of the park as well as other structures at West Glacier, Saint Mary and Rising Sun.

The shop was built by the Collins Construction Company of Kalispell at a cost of about $107,000.

== Master plan ==
The Coffee Shop was to be the first element in expansion of the Lake McDonald site with additional visitor services. The Mission 66 plan for Lake McDonald in 1955 envisioned the removal of all structures in the area except for the lodge itself and the construction of a series of one and two-story lodging units with 20 to 70 rooms each. These plans were scaled back, and were further reduced after the Great Northern Railway, which at the time owned the Glacier Park Company, objected to the plans as too costly. The Great Northern sold their Glacier Park operations to Glacier Park, Inc., operated by Don Hummell. By 1963 plans had been reduced to the construction of a "grill" at the site.

== Historic designation ==
The Lake McDonald Coffee Shop was listed on the National Register of Historic Places on October 14, 2008, before the usual 50-year anniversary requirement for NRHP properties, in recognition of its status as an exceptional example of Mission 66 design. Until its designation it was considered a non-contributing structure in the Lake McDonald Lodge Historic District.
