= List of National Natural Landmarks in Montana =

There are National Natural Landmarks in Montana.

Montana National Natural Landmarks (clickable map)

Name	Image	Date	Location	County	Ownership	Description
Bridger Fossil Area		1973		Carbon	federal (Bureau of Land Management)	Contains fossils of Deinonychus antirrhopus.
Bug Creek Fossil Area		1966	47.68299°N 106.219193°W	McCone	federal (Charles M. Russell National Wildlife Refuge)	Produced abundant remains of small, Cretaceous mammals.
Capitol Rock		1976	45.59584°N 104.120134°W	Carter	federal (Custer National Forest)	A remnant of the once continuous blanket of Tertiary deposits that covered much of the Great Plains.
Cloverly Formation Site		1973		Big Horn	tribal land (Crow Nation)	Contains early Cretaceous vertebrate fossils.
Glacial Lake Missoula		1966	46.938889°N 114.143611°W	Sanders	private	Contains the best examples of giant flood ripples in the North American continent.
Hell Creek Fossil Area		1966	46.15°N 107.48°W	Several	mixed- state, private	The type locality for Tyrannosaurus rex, Ankylosaurus magniventris, and Brachychampsa fontana fossils.
Medicine Lake Site		1980	48.468056°N 104.381667°W	Sheridan	federal (Medicine Lake National Wildlife Refuge)	An exceptional example of the processes of continental glaciation, including till, outwash, eskers, kames, and terrace deposits.
Middle Fork Canyon		1977	46.131701°N 111.109849°W	Gallatin	federal (Bureau of Land Management)	An outstanding example of a canyon cut across the grain of the geologic structure by a superposed stream.
Red Rock Lakes National Wildlife Refuge		1966	44.630278°N 111.781389°W	Beaverhead	federal	A series of relatively undisturbed, high-altitude ecosystem types representative of pre-European settlement conditions.
Square Butte (mountain)		1980	47.476499°N 110.241999°W	Chouteau	federal (Bureau of Land Management)	One of the best examples of banded magmatic rock in the United States.

== See also ==
- List of National Historic Landmarks in Montana
