= Lake McDonald Lodge Historic District =

Historic district in Montana, United States

- U.S. National Register of Historic Places
- U.S. Historic district
- Creekside Reading Room and Auditorim in 2026, built in 1927 for a soda fountain and dance hall

- Location within Montana Location within the United States
- Nearest city: West Glacier, Montana
- Coordinates: 48°37′04″N 113°52′38″W
- Area: 73 acres (30 ha)
- Built: 1909
- Architect: Kirtland, Cutter, and Malmgram (hotel)
- Architectural style: Swiss-Alpine
- MPS: Glacier National Park MRA
- NRHP reference No.: 78000280
- Added to NRHP: May 22, 1978

The Lake McDonald Lodge Historic District is a historic district in Glacier National Park in the U.S. state of Montana. It comprises the Lake McDonald Lodge and surrounding structures on the shores of Lake McDonald. It is centered on the main lodge, which was designated a National Historic Landmark in 1987, as well as surrounding guest cabins, dormitory buildings, employee residences, utility buildings, and retail structures. The district includes several privately owned inholding structures that are contributing structures, as well as a number of non-contributing buildings.

== Features ==
The Lake McDonald Lodge was built in 1913-1914 by John Lewis as the Lewis Glacier Hotel to replace an earlier structure, the Snyder Hotel. The prominent site on the lakeshore was developed as the major tourist accommodation on the west side of the park. In addition to the rustic Swiss-chalet-styled lodge building, there are a number of structures built during the early 20th century, including eleven log cabins built in 1907 near the lodge and two more built in 1918. Other buildings in the historic district include the Garden Court, a two-story frame dormitory built in 1927. The two-story frame Cobb House dormitory features rustic interior detailing and a stone fireplace. The log Snyder Hall was built in 1911 as an assembly hall and was converted to a dormitory. The log Soda Fountain, built in 1927, became a recreation hall for employees. Other buildings include the 1909 frame barbershop, a 1922 log caretaker's residence, and a 1922 frame lumber shed. The 1935 McDonald Cabin is a former private residence, built in rustic log construction. The General Store is a chalet-style structure near the main road, built about 1937. The district also includes a 1934 stone bridge over Snyder Creek and six log private residences.

== Mission 66 ==
The Lake McDonald Lodge Coffee Shop was originally excluded from the list of contributing structures as a modern intrusion. It has since been listed on its own on the National Register of Historic Places as an outstanding example of Mission 66-era design. Several other structures, including a motel unit, gas station and dormitories continue to be regarded as non-contributing to the historic district.

== Historic designation ==
The Lake McDonald Lodge Historic District was placed on the National Register of Historic Places on May 22, 1978, primarily titled as the Lewis Glacier Hotel.
