= Logan Pass Visitor Center =

United States historic place

- U.S. National Register of Historic Places
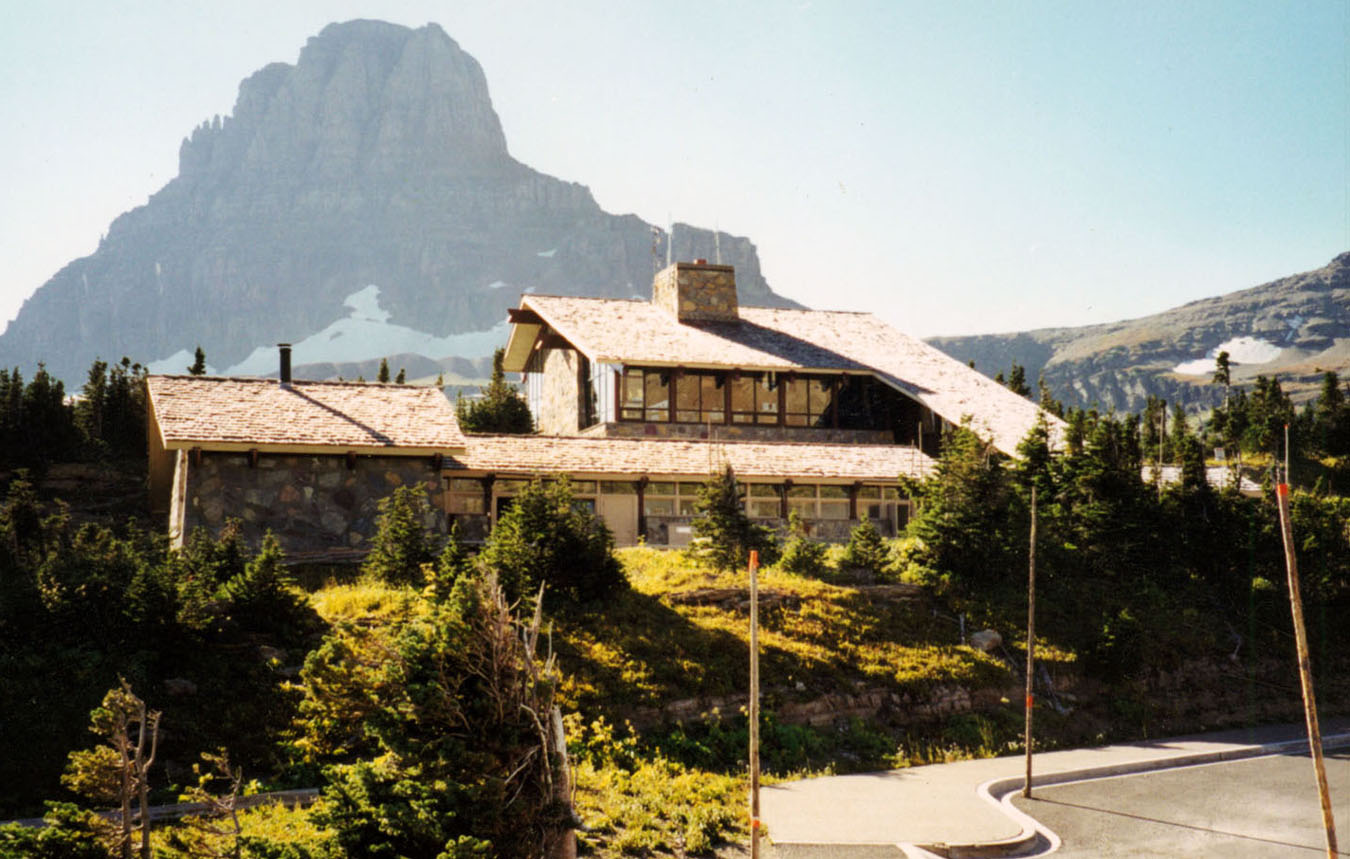

- Location within Montana Location within the United States
- Nearest city: West Glacier, Montana
- Coordinates: 48°41′43″N 113°43′4″W
- Area: less than one acre
- Built: Designed between 1960 and 1962 and built between 1963 and 1966
- Architect: Cecil Doty and Burt L. Gewalt
- Architectural style: Modern Movement, Park Service Modern
- MPS: Glacier National Park MRA
- NRHP reference No.: 08000334
- Added to NRHP: April 15, 2008

The Logan Pass Visitor Center in Glacier National Park was constructed at the summit (Logan Pass) of the Going-to-the-Sun Road during the Mission 66 park facilities improvement program. The design concept was originated by architect Cecil J. Doty of the National Park Service Western Office of Design and Construction. Burt L. Gewalt of the Kalispell, Montana architectural firm Brinkman and Lenon was responsible for the construction documents, carried out between 1960 and 1962. Construction was completed in 1966. The visitor center uses common Mission 66 themes such as a broad, gently sloping roof, native stone, and glulam timber construction.

The Logan Pass Visitor Center was one of the most significant Mission 66 projects, involving the construction of a large visitor orientation facility with attendant parking lots, utility services and amenities at the summit of Logan Pass. The altitude of the pass is 6,646 feet (2,026 m), and is inaccessible from October to May in most years. The summit of Logan Pass had previously been used as a rest stop with toilet facilities. The size of the visitor center was somewhat reduced because the Saint Mary Visitor Center at the east end of the Going-to-the-Sun Road and the park headquarters at the opposite end at West Glacier provided appropriate orientation features in a less demanding physical environment.

== Description ==
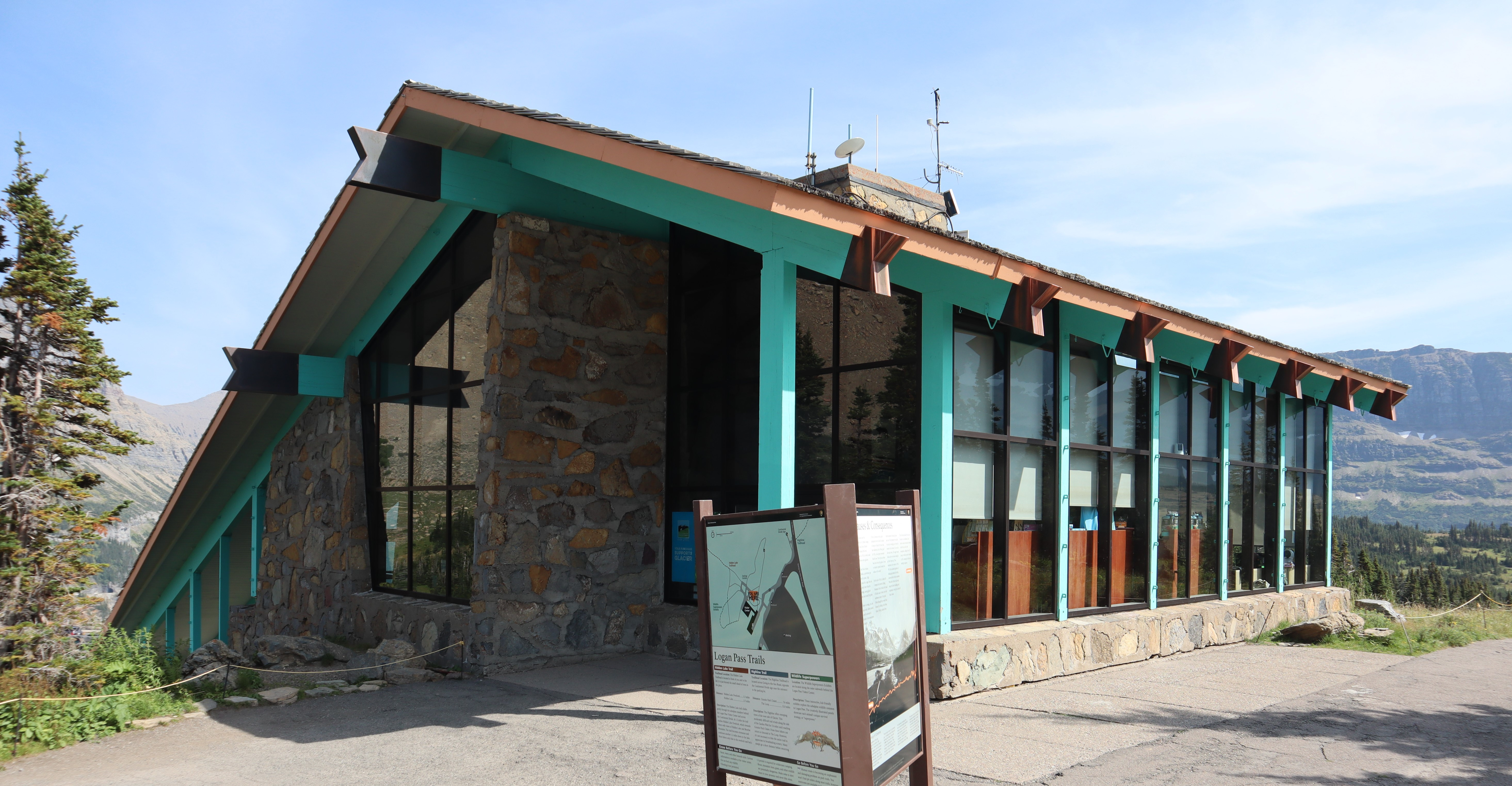
Upper level in 2026

The main section of the Logan Pass Visitor Center steps up its hillside with two main levels within a single-story enclosure. The lower level is the "Fireplace Room" facing northeast, featuring a concrete hearth with a copper hood. The information desk was originally in this space, but was moved to the upper level "Exhibit Room" in 1992. The upper level houses interpretive exhibits. As built, the visitor center used bright paint colors that were toned down to a conservative Park Service brown palette shortly after construction. Semi-separated toilet facilities are below the lower level, facing the parking lot. They were enlarged in 1985. An office addition for Park Service personnel was constructed at the same time.

The visitor center as originally built was 3,600 square feet (330 m^{2}) in area.

== Design and construction ==
Preliminary design was carried out in the Park Service's Western Office of Design and Construction, primarily by WODC architect Cecil J. Doty, with assistance from Milton Swatek and Ed Dottery. The preliminary design set forth the Park Service's design intent for size, arrangement and general architectural character. The WODC design was sent to the Kalispell architecture-engineering firm of Brinkman and Lenon, where Burt L. Gewalt was assigned the task of developing detailed design documents. Gewalt made detail changes, increasing the size of the chimney and using stone-embedded concrete, a construction method originally developed by Frank Lloyd Wright.

The construction contract was awarded to the Hefte Construction Company of Spokane, Washington in June 1963 for a contract cost of about $136,600. A separate contract was awarded for water and sewer utility work, for $61,319. Work began in July 1963 and stopped in late October for the winter. It resumed in July 1964, running through October, and again in 1965. The visitor center was completed on August 27, 1966. A separate contract for parking lot and site improvements was completed on September 12, 1966 at a cost of $168,176. Gewalt was the supervising architect through construction.

== Historic designation ==
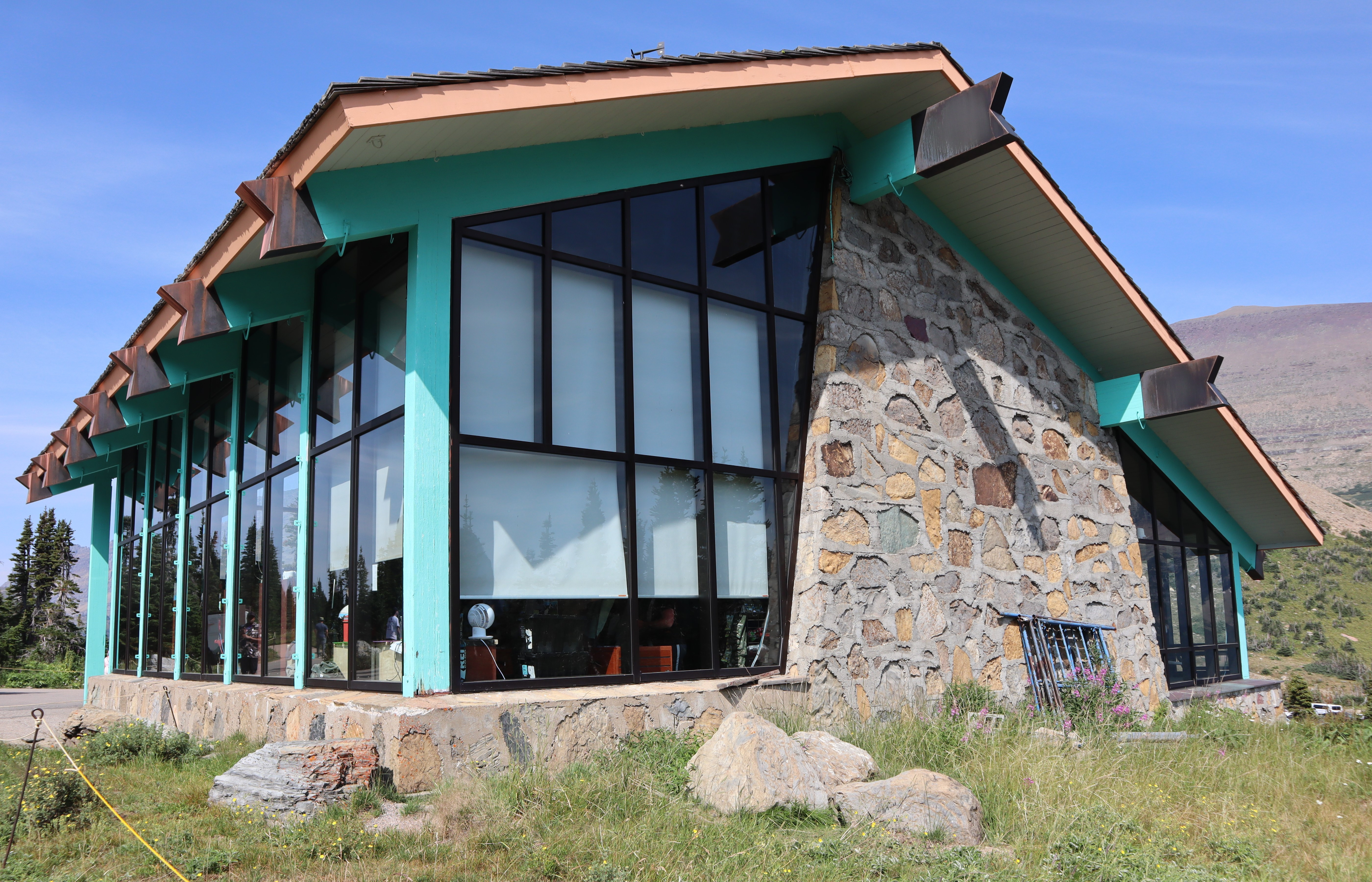
The building from the back in 2026, restored to original colors

The Logan Pass Visitor Center was listed on the National Register of Historic Places on April 15, 2008, when it was 44 years old, less than the usual threshold for inclusion of 50 years. The visitor center was cited in the nomination for its unusual design significance and prominence in Glacier National Park.

== See also ==
- William Edmond Logan
- Saint Mary Visitor Center, Entrance Station and Checking Stations and the Lake McDonald Lodge Coffee Shop, also designed by Gewalt
