= Saint Mary Visitor Center, Entrance Station and Checking Stations =

- U.S. National Register of Historic Places
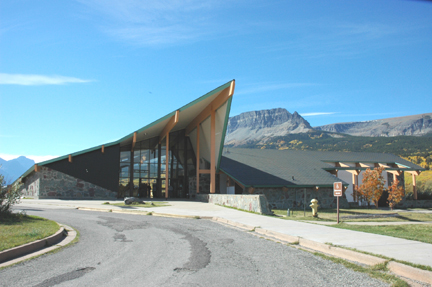
- Visitor Center

- Location within Montana Location within the United States
- Nearest city: Saint Mary, Montana
- Coordinates: 48.7474°N 113.4391°W
- Built: 1967
- Architect: Burt L. Gewalt
- MPS: Glacier National Park MRA
- NRHP reference No.: 08000335
- Added to NRHP: April 15, 2008

The Saint Mary Visitor Center in Glacier National Park, with the connected Saint Mary Checking Station and Entrance Station was constructed at the east entrance to the Going-to-the-Sun Road during the Mission 66 park facilities improvement program. It was designed by Burt L. Gewalt of the Kalispell, Montana architectural firm Brinkman and Lenon, and was completed in 1967. The complex uses common Mission 66 themes such as native stone, and glulam timber construction, combined with a dramatic roof structure that echoes the mountain peaks in the background. The stone in the walls came from the Going-to-the-Sun Road. The view of the "St. Mary" webcam on the Glacier National Park official website is broadcast from the center and shows the westward-facing view over St. Mary Lake, which includes a distant view of Logan's Pass. There is also an osprey nest about one hundred meters to the east of the building, which can be viewed from the visitor parking lot and from the park's osprey webcam.

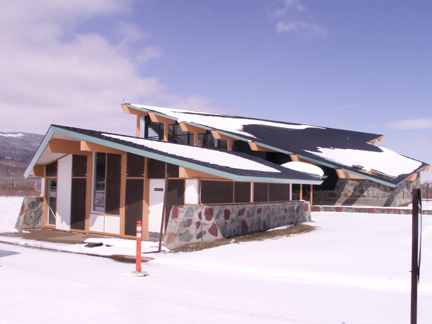
Entrance Station

The complex consists of the main visitor center, with a connected entrance station. Two checking stations or kiosks are located in the roadway. Recent renovations have restored the original teal, ebony and peach color scheme, which had been obscured by the application of standard National Park Service brown paint.

== See also ==
- St. Mary Utility Area Historic District
- Lake McDonald Lodge Coffee Shop, also designed by Gewalt, and the Logan Pass Visitor Center, concept by Cecil Doty of the NPS and construction documents carried out by Gewalt
