= Glacier National Park Conservancy =

Montana non-profit fundraising organization

- Abbreviation: GNPC
- Formation: January 1, 2013; 13 years ago
- Merger of: Glacier National Park Fund; Glacier Natural History Association
- Type: 501(c)(3) Foundation
- Tax ID no.: 56-2579734
- Legal status: 501(c)(3)
- Purpose: Fundraising
- Headquarters: Columbia Falls, Montana
- Location: United States
- Board Chair: Margaret Notley
- Executive Director: Doug Mitchell
- Website: https://glacier.org/

The Glacier National Park Conservancy was established on January 1, 2013, from a merger of the Glacier National Park Fund (established in 1999) and the Glacier Association (established in 1941). The Glacier National Park Fund previously operated as a non-profit fundraising organization whose main goal was to raise money to support various needs of Glacier National Park, headquartered in West Glacier, Montana. In its history, the Glacier National Park Fund raised 3.5 million dollars. The Glacier Association was founded in 1941 and incorporated in 1946 and provided funding from receipts received from book and merchandise sales at not only Glacier National park bookstores and visitor centers, but at other federal facilities including Flathead National Forest, Grant-Kohrs Ranch National Historic Site, and the Big Hole National Battlefield, all of which are located in the state of Montana.

The Glacier National Park Conservancy has provided funding for educational programs, the construction of handicapped accessible trails, updating facilities and for restoration of historic structures such as when the Sperry Chalet was nearly destroyed by the Sprague Fire in 2017.
