= Lake McDonald Lodge =

- U.S. National Register of Historic Places
- U.S. National Historic Landmark
- U.S. Historic district – Contributing property
- The lake elevation of Lake McDonald Lodge

- Location within Montana Location within the United States
- Location: West Glacier, Montana
- Coordinates: 48°37′2″N 113°52′44″W
- Area: 2.25 acres (0.91 ha)
- Built: 1913
- Architect: Cutter & Malmgram
- Architectural style: Swiss Chalet Revival
- Part of: Lake McDonald Lodge Historic District (ID78000280)
- MPS: Glacier National Park MRA (AD)
- NRHP reference No.: 87001447

Significant dates
- Added to NRHP: May 28, 1987
- Designated NHL: May 28, 1987
- Designated CP: May 22, 1978

The Lake McDonald Lodge is a historic lodge located within Glacier National Park, on the southeast shore of Lake McDonald. The lodge is a 3 1/2-story structure built in 1913 based on Kirtland Cutter's design. The foundation and first floor walls are built of stone, with a wood-frame superstructure. The lobby is a large, open space that extends to the third story. It has a massive fireplace and a concrete floor scored in a flagstone pattern, with messages in several Indian languages inscribed into it. The rustic lodge was designated a National Historic Landmark in 1987 as one of the nation's finest examples of large-scale Swiss chalet architecture. Lake McDonald Lodge is a member of Historic Hotels of America, the official program of the National Trust for Historic Preservation.

== History ==
The Lake McDonald Lodge, initially known as the Lewis Glacier Hotel, was the second hotel on the site. The first, the Snyder Hotel, was built by George Snyder in 1895. It was accessed by a steamboat that ran the 10 miles (16 km) from the Apgar area to the hotel, preceded by a two-mile trip on a horse-drawn carriage and a ferry trip over the Middle Fork Flathead River.

The Lewis Glacier Hotel lodge was built in 1913 by John Lewis, a land speculator from Columbia Falls, Montana. He bought the land, amounting to about 285 acres (115 ha), in 1904-5 and had the hotel built during a period when the Great Northern Railway was building other hotels and backcountry chalets, including Many Glacier Hotel, Glacier Park Lodge, Granite Park Chalet, Sperry Chalet, and Two Medicine Store. This movement was part of a trend by railroads during that time to build destination resorts in areas of exceptional scenic value. Railroads wanted to attract tourists and create resorts that were equal to the scenery, and private operators like John Lewis had to build equally impressive facilities in order to keep up. The Lewis hotel, designed by the Spokane firm of Kirtland, Cutter and Malmbren, was a much more ambitious undertaking. The hotel was built in 1913–14, working through the winter months, and opened in June 1914. The new hotel was designed to continue the Swiss cottage theme already developed by the Great Northern railway hotels. Artist Charles M. Russell was a frequent guest at the hotel in the 1920s, and is claimed to have etched pictographs in the dining room's original fireplace hearth.

In 1930, the Great Northern Railway acquired the hotel through its subsidiary, the Glacier Park Hotel Company. The hotel's name was changed to Lake McDonald Lodge in 1957. It was damaged in a flash flood in 1964 that destroyed the fireplace and the Russell etchings. The Glacier Park Hotel Company was sold to the Dial Corporation in 1981, then spun off with the Viad company. The lodge was extensively renovated in 1988–89, restoring details that had been obscured over time or damaged by the Snyder Creek 1964 flood. Today, the lodge maintains its historic character. The hotel also includes a number of small cottages located nearby, as well as a motor inn. The main lodge was declared a National Historic Landmark in 1987.

== Description ==
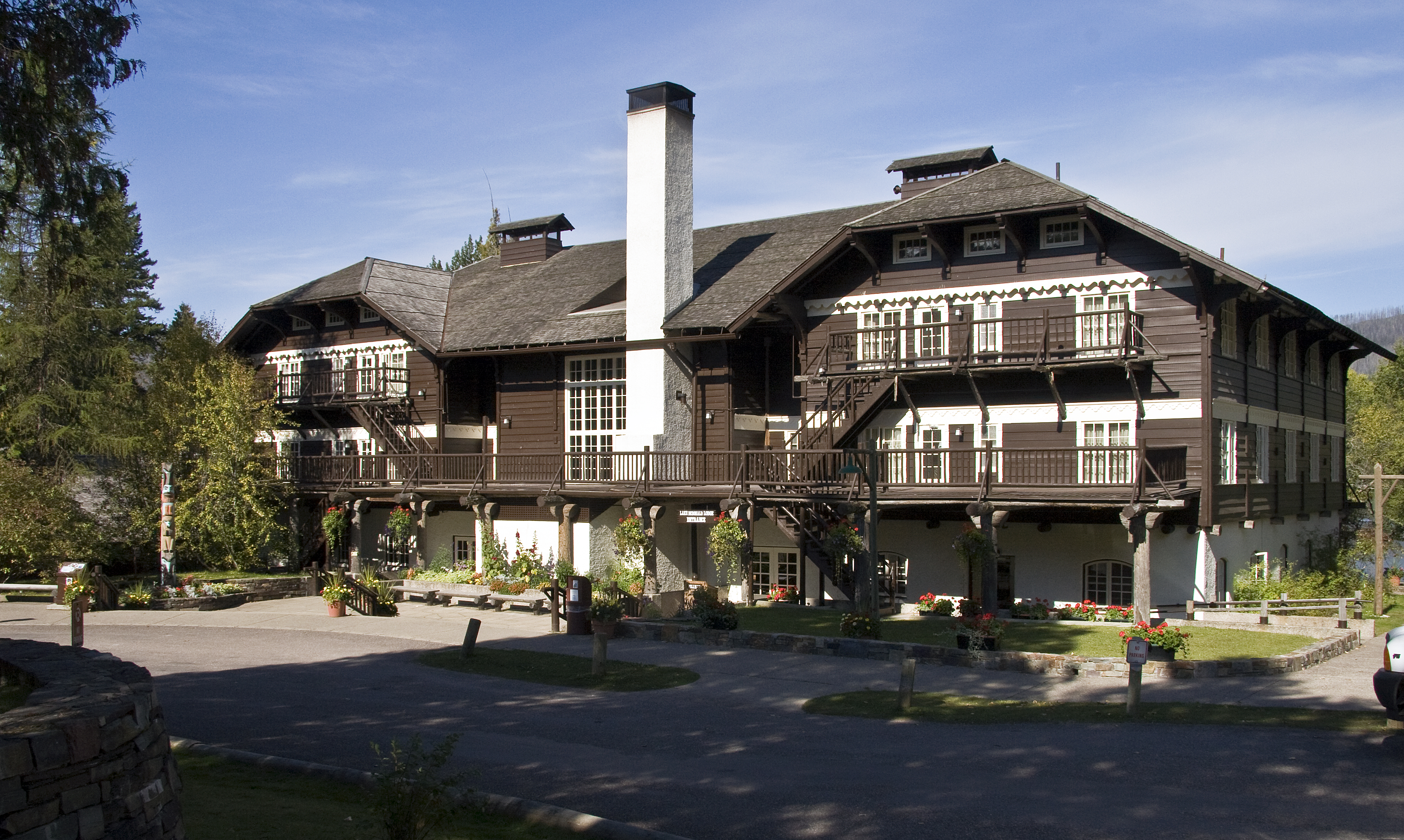
Present main entry, Lake McDonald Lodge

The Lake McDonald Lodge faces the lake, where early visitors arrived. With the construction of the Going-to-the-Sun Road, visitors began to arrive at what had, until then, been the rear of the hotel, which still retains its character as a secondary entrance despite the traffic it receives. Road access arrived by 1921. The main building is 3 1/2 stories high, with a stone foundation and wood framing above. Exposed stone surfaces on the exterior have mostly been covered with white stucco. The upper floors are clad in brown wood clapboards, with sawn fancy trim patterns picked out in white on the upper levels as frieze bands. The white stucco fireplace chimney dominates the present entry elevation, offset around the window above the fireplace.

The hotel features a large lobby near the northeastern end which faces southeast, centered on a large stone fireplace set in an inglenook recess on the south wall, surmounted by a large window. The lobby is three stories tall, decorated with skins and taxidermy mounts of native species acquired or trapped by John Lewis, who supplemented the hotel business by trapping, often in the park. There are balconies on the second floor to either side, and on the second and third floors at the rear of the lobby. The building's heavy timber frame is exposed in this area. Stairways to the upper levels feature natural burled log elements. This element is flanked by guest room sections with perpendicular gables on either side. Guest rooms are primarily on the two upper levels. The dining room is to the southwest of the lobby on the main floor in a 1 1/2-story wing, facing the lake, with a 1 1/2-story kitchen wing adjoining. The exterior features balconies on all elevations on the guest room levels and porches on the ground levels. Exposed framing is a mixture of sawn heavy timbers and log framing, often with the bark remaining. Sawn railings with decorative patterns have replaced some of the log railings on the balconies. Log railings remain in the upper levels of the lobby.

Parts of the dining room may have been the first component of the present hotel to be built. The dining wing was found to be a compilation of several smaller structures during the 1980s renovations, with an entry on an upper level overlooking the main room. Renovation work adjusted the elevation of the entry drive, which had previously been near the level of the second floor windows, to be only slightly above the ground floor elevation.

Many of the original furnishings have remained with the lodge. A number of hickory chairs with log frames are original, as are the piano and a large table and many of the trophies. Other furnishings are reproductions of Old Hickory and Roycroft pieces, while rugs are reproductions of Gustav Stickley originals. The hanging lanterns are reproductions of original work made by Kanai craftsmen for the Prince of Wales Hotel in Waterton Lakes National Park, Canada, which had been moved to Lake McDonald in the 1960s. In 2013 the lodge acquired a large 4x8 foot mural painting featuring Lake McDonald that had been painted on location in 1962 by Ace Powell. The painting had been commissioned by a couple from Cincinnati, Ohio, who were visiting Glacier Park for the first time.

The Lake McDonald Hotel was designated a National Historic Landmark on May 28, 1987, and is contained within the larger Lake McDonald Lodge Historic District, which had been listed on the National Register of Historic Places on May 22. 1978.

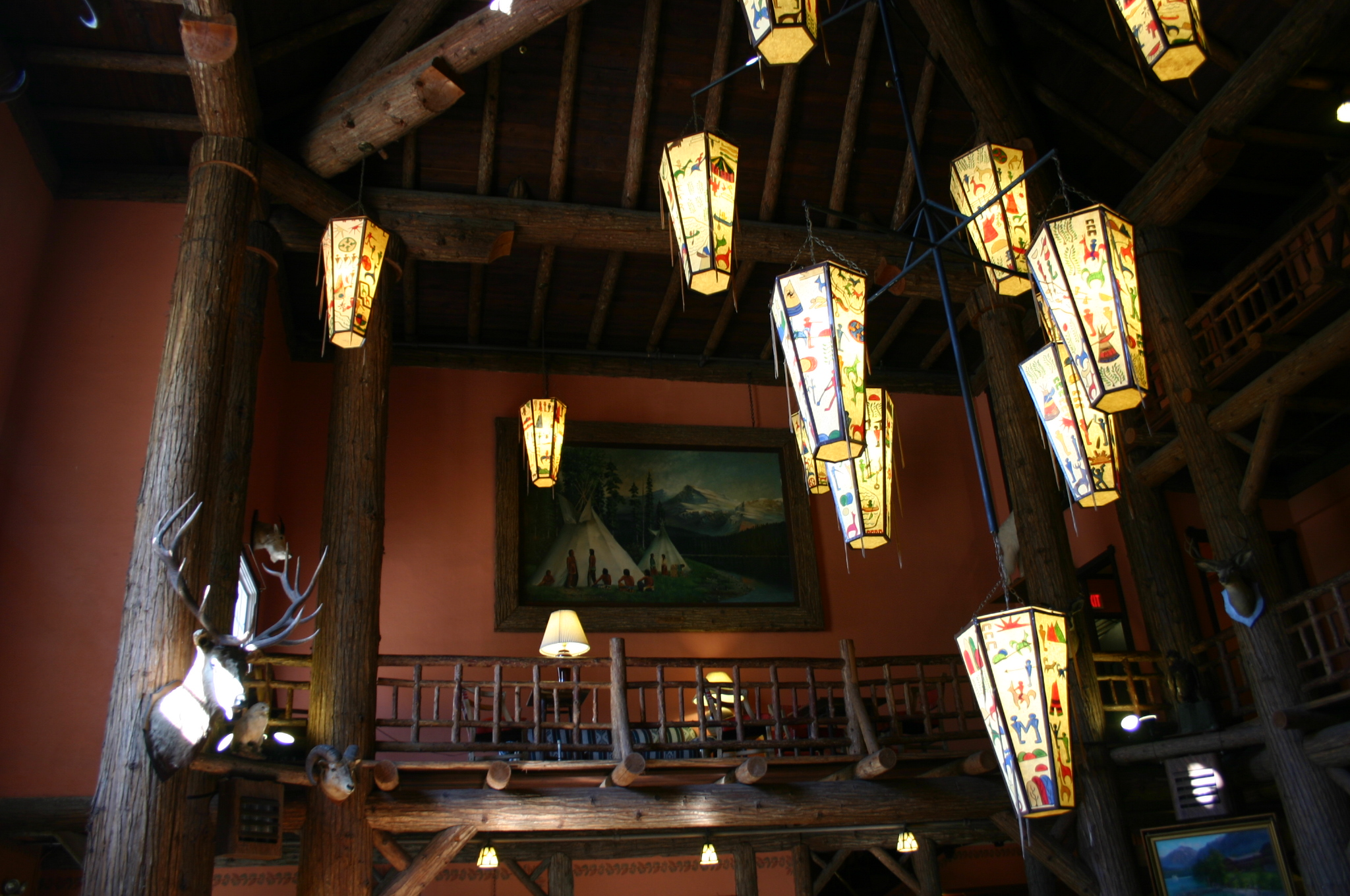
Lanterns in the lobby

== See also ==
- List of Historic Hotels of America
- Many Glacier Hotel at Babb, Montana within Glacier National Park
- Prince of Wales Hotel within Waterton Lakes National Park
- List of National Historic Landmarks in Montana
- National Register of Historic Places listings in Flathead County, Montana
