= Great Northern Railway Buildings =

- U.S. National Register of Historic Places
- U.S. National Historic Landmark District
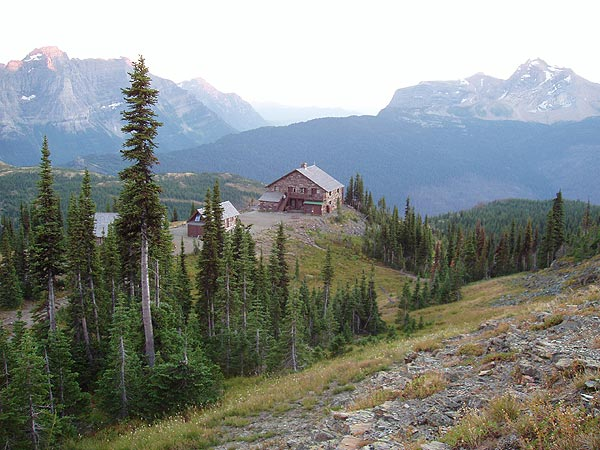
- Granite Park Chalet

- Location within Montana Location within the United States
- Location: Glacier National Park, Montana
- Coordinates: 48°46′15″N 113°46′20.5″W
- Built: 1913
- Architect: Samuel L. Bartlett, et al.
- Architectural style: Swiss Chalet Revival
- NRHP reference No.: 87001453

Significant dates
- Added to NRHP: May 28, 1987
- Boundary increase: May 16, 2000
- Designated NHLD: May 28, 1987

The Great Northern Railway Buildings are a set of five building complexes in or near Glacier National Park in Montana. They were built by the Great Northern Railway during the period of the park's founding to provide a unified tourist experience to visitors to the park, using the Swiss chalet as a building model. The building complexes, each separately listed on the National Register of Historic Places, are:

- Belton Chalets
- Granite Park Chalet
- Many Glacier Hotel
- Sperry Chalet
- Two Medicine General Store

Four of these complexes were declared a discontiguous National Historic Landmark District in 1987, notable as the largest such concentration of Swiss chalet architecture in the country. In May 2000, the designation was amended to include the Belton Chalets, which differs from the other buildings in being located just outside the park.

== History ==
Glacier National Park was founded in 1910. Its creation received significant support from the Great Northern Railway, which passed just south of the park, and which stood to benefit from increased tourist traffic on its line, following similar railroad-related developments at Grand Canyon National Park and Yellowstone National Park. In order to present a unified yet flexible tourist experience, the railroad partnered with the National Park Service to provide infrastructure both inside and outside the park to serve a variety of tourist needs.

The services the Great Northern sought to offer ranged from elegant hotel accommodations to a rustic and somewhat rough backcountry experience. Their buildings were unified by the use of a single architectural style, the Swiss chalet, which railroad president Louis W. Hill adopted from the European mountain experience. Granite Park Chalet and Sperry Chalet, built in 1914, are examples of backcountry accommodations built by the railroad. The Many Glacier Hotel, completed in 1915, was the centerpiece, a large and grand hotel with elegant amenities. The Two Medicine General Store is a surviving remnant of a mid-sized lakeside hotel built on the shores of Two Medicine Lake; one of its two rustic log chalet structures has been demolished, and the other now serves as a general store.

The Great Northern also built service areas just outside the boundaries of the park. The Belton Chalets, built in 1910-11, were among the first buildings the company built for this effort, and were located at what was then the main station for accessing the park. The Glacier Park Lodge was built in 1913 to serve visitors approaching from the east.

When the National Historic Landmark District was designated in 1987, it was restricted to properties located in the park bounds. The National Park Service at the time noted the significance of the Belton Chalets and the Glacier Park Lodge, recommending that they be analyzed for inclusion in the landmark designation, since they appeared to be eligible. As a result, the Belton Chalets were included in a 2000 amendment; the owners of the Glacier Park Lodge declined participation.

== See also ==
- List of National Historic Landmarks in Montana
- National Register of Historic Places listings in Flathead County, Montana
- National Register of Historic Places listings in Glacier County, Montana
