= Belton Chalets =

- U.S. National Register of Historic Places
- U.S. National Historic Landmark District – Contributing property
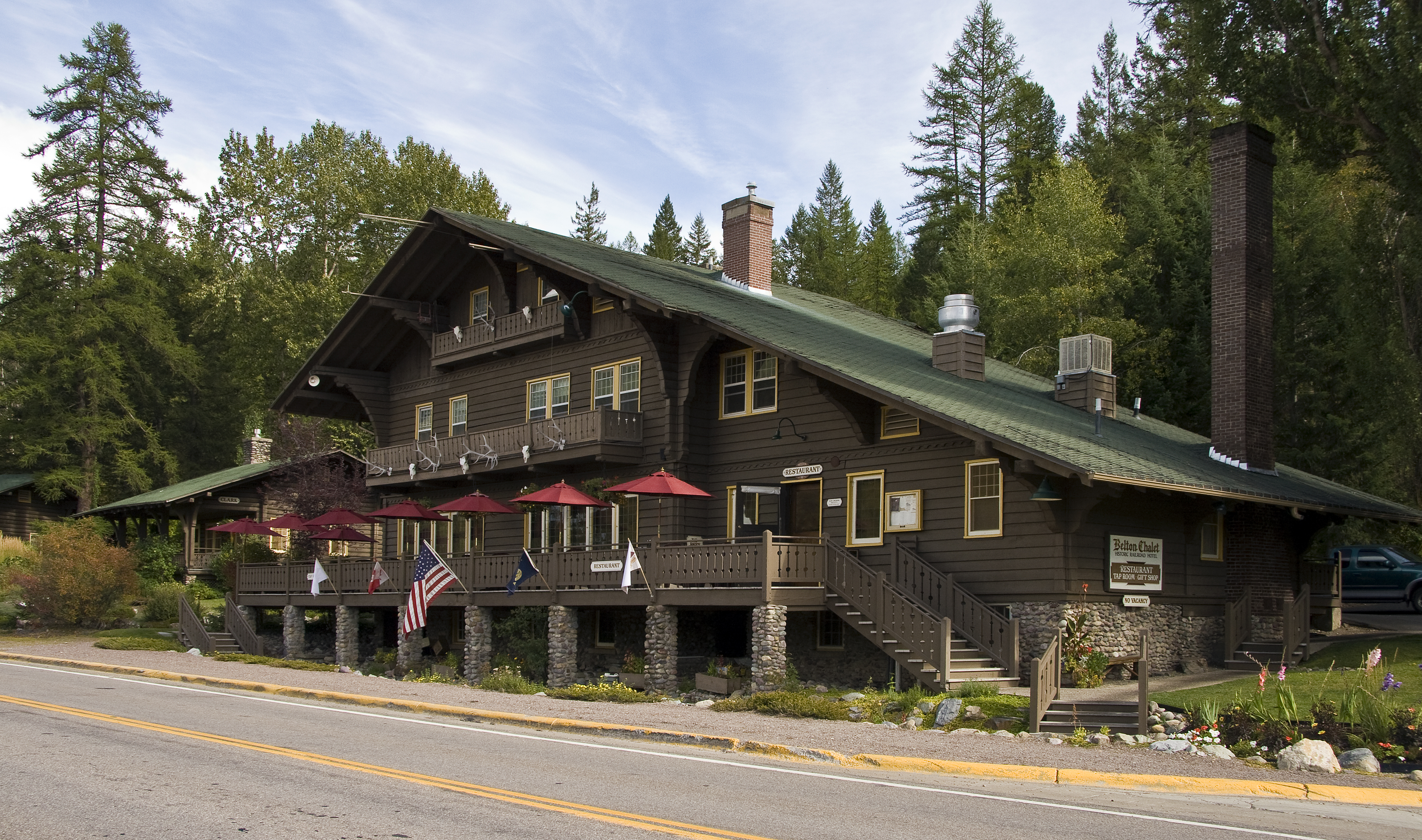

- Location within Montana Location within the United States
- Location: West Glacier, Montana
- Coordinates: 48°29′48″N 113°58′32″W
- Built: 1907
- Architect: Cutter & Malgren
- Architectural style: Swiss Chalet Revival
- NRHP reference No.: 78001685
- Added to NRHP: November 15, 1978

The Belton Chalets are a group of historic hotel buildings in the village of West Glacier, Montana, near the western entrance to Glacier National Park. The chalet buildings were built in 1910-11 by the Great Northern Railway (GN) as the first component of the railroad's ambitious program of hotel, road, and trail construction in Glacier. The buildings featured a "Swiss Chalet" architectural style that set the style for much of the Great Northern's building program in Glacier. Ultimately, the site included five buildings, including a dining hall and a hotel facility.

During the 1910s and 1920s the Belton Chalet was operated by the Glacier Park Hotel Company, the GN subsidiary responsible for the railroad's concession operations in Glacier. The property was less successful than the GN's other Glacier facilities, however, probably due to its remoteness from the park's other railway-operated hotels, and by the 1930s it saw only intermittent use. The railway sold the chalet buildings in 1946, and the main hotel building stood empty for most of the next five decades, while a cafe and bar intermittently operated in the old dining hall. In 1997, the property was acquired by new owners who undertook a $1 million restoration of the entire complex, and the hotel reopened beginning with the 1998 summer season. The chalet buildings, together with other sites were included in the National Historic Landmark designation of Great Northern Railway Buildings in 2000.

== See also ==
- Great Northern Railway Buildings
