= McDonald Lake (Nova Scotia) =

Lake in Nova Scotia, Canada

- Location within Nova Scotia
- Location: Richmond County, Nova Scotia
- Coordinates: 45°43′13″N 60°57′48″W
- Basin countries: Canada

McDonald Lake is a lake of Richmond County, in north-eastern Nova Scotia, Canada.

== See also ==
- List of lakes in Nova Scotia
