= Many Glacier Hotel =

United States historic hotel in Glacier National Park

- Many Glacier Hotel Historic District
- U.S. National Register of Historic Places
- U.S. National Historic Landmark District – Contributing property
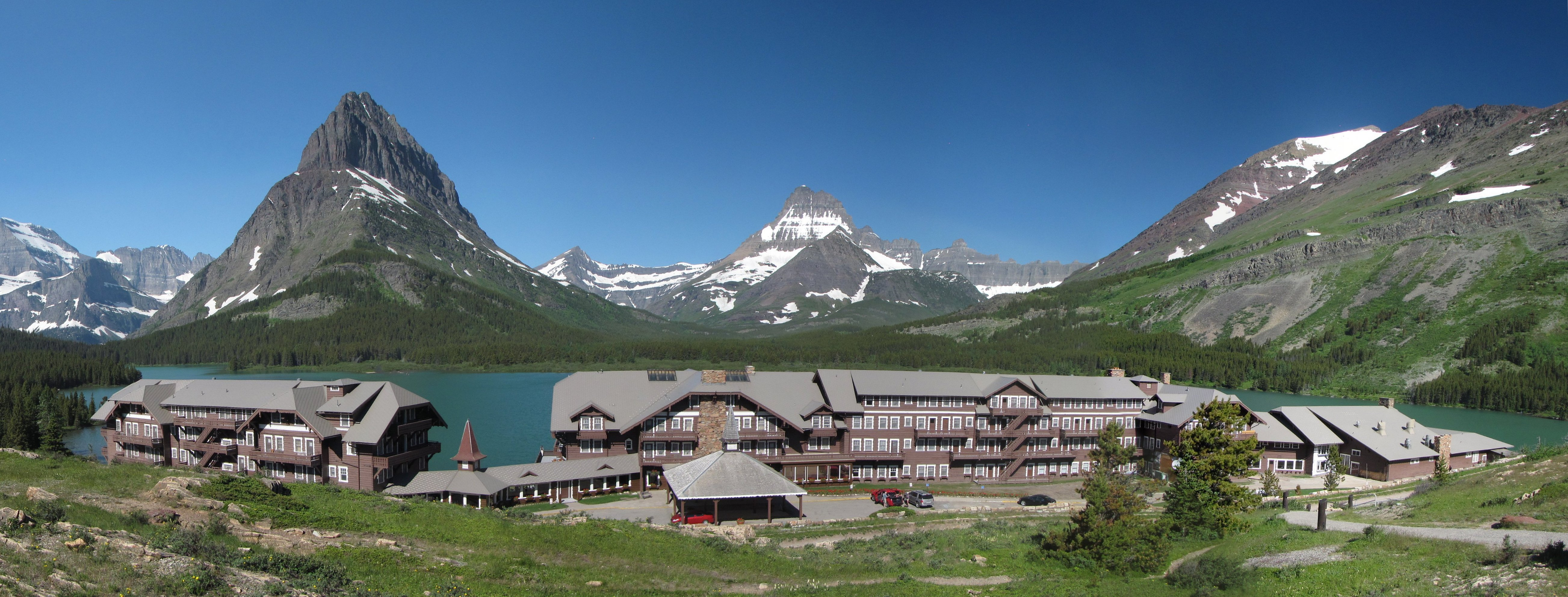
- Many Glacier Hotel in 2019

- Location within Montana Location within the United States
- Nearest city: Babb, Montana
- Coordinates: 48°47′48.53″N 113°39′27.95″W
- Built: 1914
- Architect: Thomas D. McMahon
- MPS: Glacier National Park MRA (AD)
- NRHP reference No.: 76000173
- Added to NRHP: September 29, 1976

Many Glacier Hotel is a historic hotel located on the east shore of Swiftcurrent Lake in Glacier National Park in the U.S. state of Montana. Built in 1914 by the Great Northern Railway, the hotel is considered today to be a National Historic Landmark and is a member of Historic Hotels of America. The design of the hotel is in the Swiss chalet style.

== History and design ==
Construction began at Many Glacier Hotel in 1914 and was finished in just 1 year on July 4, 1915. The Great Northern Railway was establishing a series of hotels and backcountry chalets in the park and the Many Glacier Hotel was the "Gem of the West". This was part of an effort by Louis W. Hill, president of the Great Northern Railway and son of James J. Hill, to establish Glacier National Park as a destination resort and to promote the area as the "American Alps". To this end, Hill chose a Swiss chalet style for the hotels and chalets. The Glacier Park Lodge (previously known as the Glacier Park Hotel) and the Many Glacier Hotel were intended to be the core structures, while the chalets and campgrounds were sited in the backcountry within an easy day's ride or hike from one of the hotels or another chalet. The chalets were intended to entice visitors to leave the hotels and see the backcountry in a more rustic manner. These chalets were especially used during the early 1900s when Many Glacier Hotel first opened, and the main attraction in the park was horseback riding.

The building is designed as a series of chalets, up to four stories tall, and stretches for a substantial distance along the lakeshore. The building's Swiss alpine theme is featured pm both the outside and inside. The foundation is made of stone, with a wood superstructure. The outside is finished with brown-painted wood siding, and the window framing and balconies have Swiss jigsawed patterns. On the inside, the four-story lobby is surrounded by balconies, whose railings are patterned after Swiss designs.

The hotel was closed due to COVID-19 in 2020. It opened again on June 4, 2021. The hotel includes 2 suites, 7 family rooms, and 205 guest rooms offering. All of the rooms have private bathrooms, telephones, king and queen beds or standard double or twin beds. Guest and hotel facilities are all non-smoking.

== Current status ==
Today, the hotel still maintains its historic character. Most rooms either have views of Swiftcurrent Lake or the surrounding mountain scenery. The hotel is a contributing property in the National Historic Landmark, Great Northern Railway Buildings district. Many Glacier Hotel is a member of Historic Hotels of America, the official program of the National Trust for Historic Preservation. Since 2014, the hotel has been managed by Xanterra.

The hotel is open from early June to mid-September. Facilities include the Ptarmigan Dining room, the Swiss Room Lounge and Interlaken Lounge, Heidi's Snack Shop, and a gift shop.

The road to the hotel and nearby Swiftcurrent Motor Inn is partially a gravel road. The hotel and nearby areas are popular starting points for several hikes, including to Grinnell Glacier, Iceberg Lake, and Ptarmigan Falls.

== Gallery ==
The hotel in August 2015

Boat rides and canoe/kayak rentals are offered on Swiftcurrent Lake

The hotel's back balcony. The bellhops wear lederhosen, in-line with the hotel's Swiss chalet style

A 1941 postcard view of the main lobby

The hotel (shown here in April 2011) is closed for most of the year due to the weather.

== See also ==
- List of Historic Hotels of America
- Lake McDonald Lodge at West Glacier, Montana within Glacier National Park
- Prince of Wales Hotel within Waterton Lakes National Park
