= Sperry Chalet =

Building in Montana, United States

- Interactive map of the Sperry Chalet area

General information
- Status: Rebuilt
- Elevation: 6,560 ft (2,000 m)
- Owner: National Park Service
- Sperry Chalet
- U.S. National Register of Historic Places
- U.S. National Historic Landmark District – Contributing property
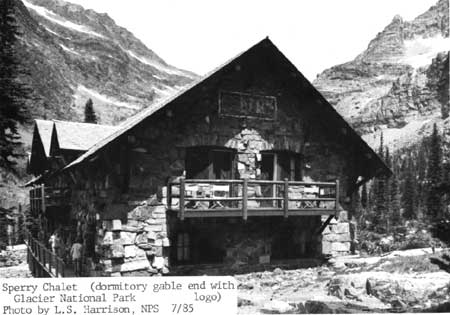
- Sperry Chalet - The initials under the gable are "GNRy," for Great Northern Railway

- Location within Montana Location within the United States
- Nearest city: West Glacier, Montana
- Coordinates: 48°36′16″N 113°47′08″W
- Built: 1913
- Built by: Great Northern Railway
- Architect: Cutter & Malmgren
- NRHP reference No.: 77000115
- Added to NRHP: August 2, 1977

Sperry Chalet is located about seven miles east of Lake McDonald in Glacier National Park in the U.S. state of Montana. The chalet was opened in 1914 by the Great Northern Railway and was a National Historic Landmark contributing property, being one of five structures in the Great Northern Railway Buildings National Historic Landmark. Along with Granite Park Chalet, Sperry Chalet is one of the two remaining backcountry chalets in Glacier National Park, both operated by Belton Chalets, Inc.

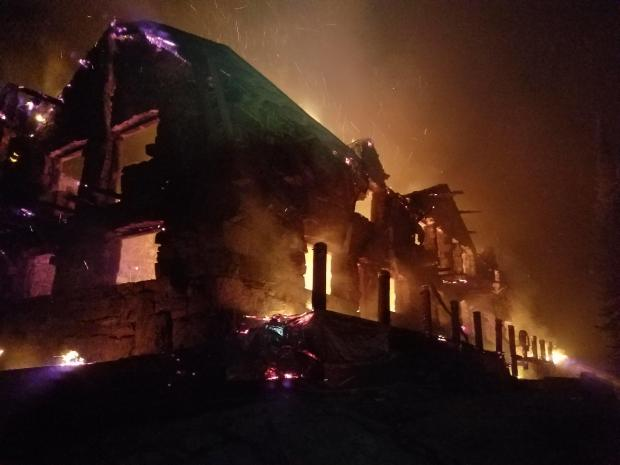
Sperry Chalet on fire the night of August 31, 2017

The chalet is reached only by trail, via hiking or horseback. One of the two trails leading to the chalet is the Sperry Trail, which starts at the Lake McDonald Lodge parking lot and stretches 6.7 miles to the chalet, climbing 3200 feet in the process. The trail passes along the base of Mount Brown and over the west ridge of Mount Edwards, with views of U-shaped valleys along the way. A side trip to Sperry Glacier is also possible, being a 4-mile hike (8 miles round trip). The other means of accessing the chalet is via the Gunsight Trail, which is a 12.1-mile hike from the Jackson Glacier Overlook on Going-to-the-Sun Road. This hike averages 9 hours.

The chalet, nestled in a glacial cirque, consists of two buildings from the Great Northern era: a two-story hotel building and a kitchen/dining room building. A restroom facility was added, but was not part of the historic landmark designation. The dormitory building, completed in 1913, was built with random rubble masonry, providing a feel of architectural ruggedness, and was topped with a large gable roof that had two dormers on either side. The kitchen building, completed in 1912, is also made of random rubble masonry, but used smaller stones and appears less striking in its design. The kitchen building is topped with a lower gable roof.

Unlike Granite Park Chalet, Sperry Chalet provides traditional meal service: dinner, breakfast, and either a trail lunch or an ala carte lunch in the dining room. The guest rooms are private, but in line with the backcountry experience, there is no electricity or heat. There is running water at the restroom facility.

On August 31, 2017, the hotel/dormitory building of Sperry Chalet burned during the Sprague Fire. The wood portions of the main chalet burned, gutting the structure, but the surrounding outbuildings were saved. After the fire, U.S. Secretary of the Interior Ryan Zinke stated that rebuilding the Sperry Chalet would be a top priority and an engineering firm had already inspected the structure and was preparing a proposal on how to reinforce the stone walls for the upcoming winter and other stabilization efforts. A fund for stabilization was established, overseen by the Glacier National Park Conservancy. Work to brace the stone walls to prevent their collapse was scheduled to begin in October 2017, with supplies brought in by helicopter. After an environmental impact statement was completed National Park Service authorities determined that the chalet would be rebuilt using the original stone exterior and aside from some minor modifications to meet current building codes, have all the same design as the original structure. The rebuilding process was expected to last during the summers of 2018 and 2019, and is scheduled to reopen in July 2020.

The National Park Service awarded two contracts to Dick Anderson Construction to complete the rebuild project in two phases during the summers of 2018 and 2019. Subcontractor work was performed by Anderson Masonry of Kalispell with redesign efforts led by Anderson Hallas Architects.

On July 18, 2020, Sperry Chalet opened its doors to guests for the first time since it was burned in the Sprague Fire. Reservations can be made online beginning in January for the subsequent summer season.

== Gallery ==
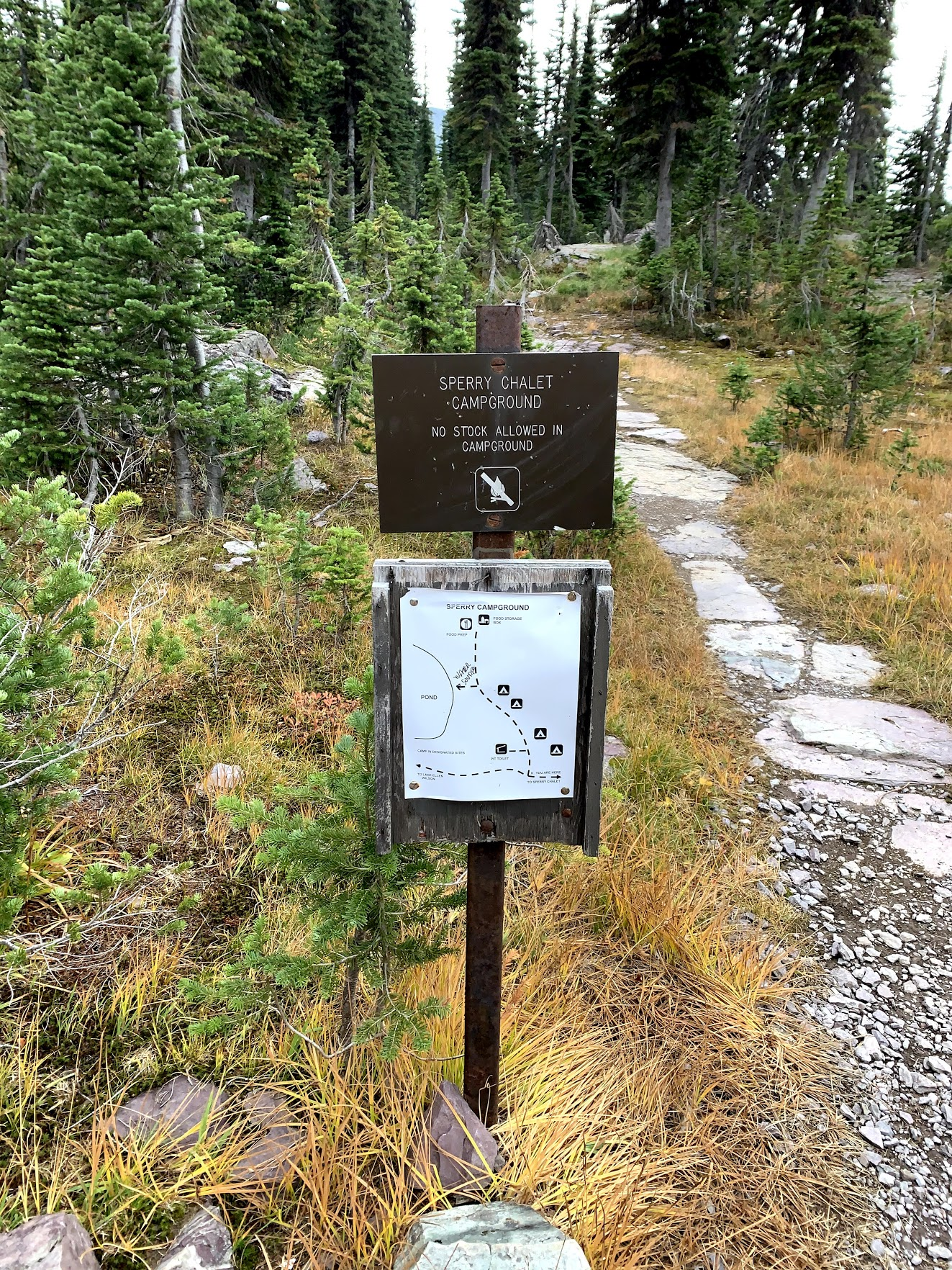
A sign at the campground located beside the Sperry Chalet
