= Granite Park Chalet =

- U.S. National Register of Historic Places
- U.S. National Historic Landmark District – Contributing property
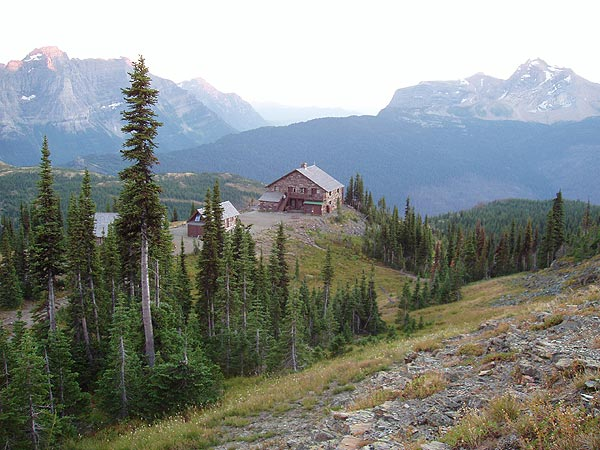
- Mount Cannon on the left. Heavens Peak on the right.

- Location within Montana Location within the United States
- Nearest city: West Glacier, Montana
- Coordinates: 48°46′15″N 113°46′20.5″W
- Built: 1913
- NRHP reference No.: 83001060
- Added to NRHP: June 27, 1983

Granite Park Chalet is located in the heart of Glacier National Park in the U.S. state of Montana at an elevation of 6,693 feet above sea level. The chalet was built in 1914 by the Great Northern Railway and is a National Historic Landmark contributing property, being one of five structures in the Great Northern Railway Buildings district. From Logan Pass along the Going-to-the-Sun Road, the chalet is a moderate 7.6 miles (12.2 km) hike along the famed Crown of the Continent Highline Trail, usually referred to simply as the Highline Trail. Much of the trail passes through the scenic Garden Wall section of the park, immediately west and parallel to the Continental Divide. The chalet is also accessible via the Loop Trail (4 miles (6.4 km), 2,200 feet (670 m) elevation gain) and the Swiftcurrent Trail (7.5 miles (12.1 km), 2,300 feet (700 m) elevation gain). The trails are for hikers and horseback riders only; no vehicle access is provided. Granite Park Chalet is a limited services facility and those that spend the night make use of the full service kitchen to cook their own meals.

September 2014

21 April 2013

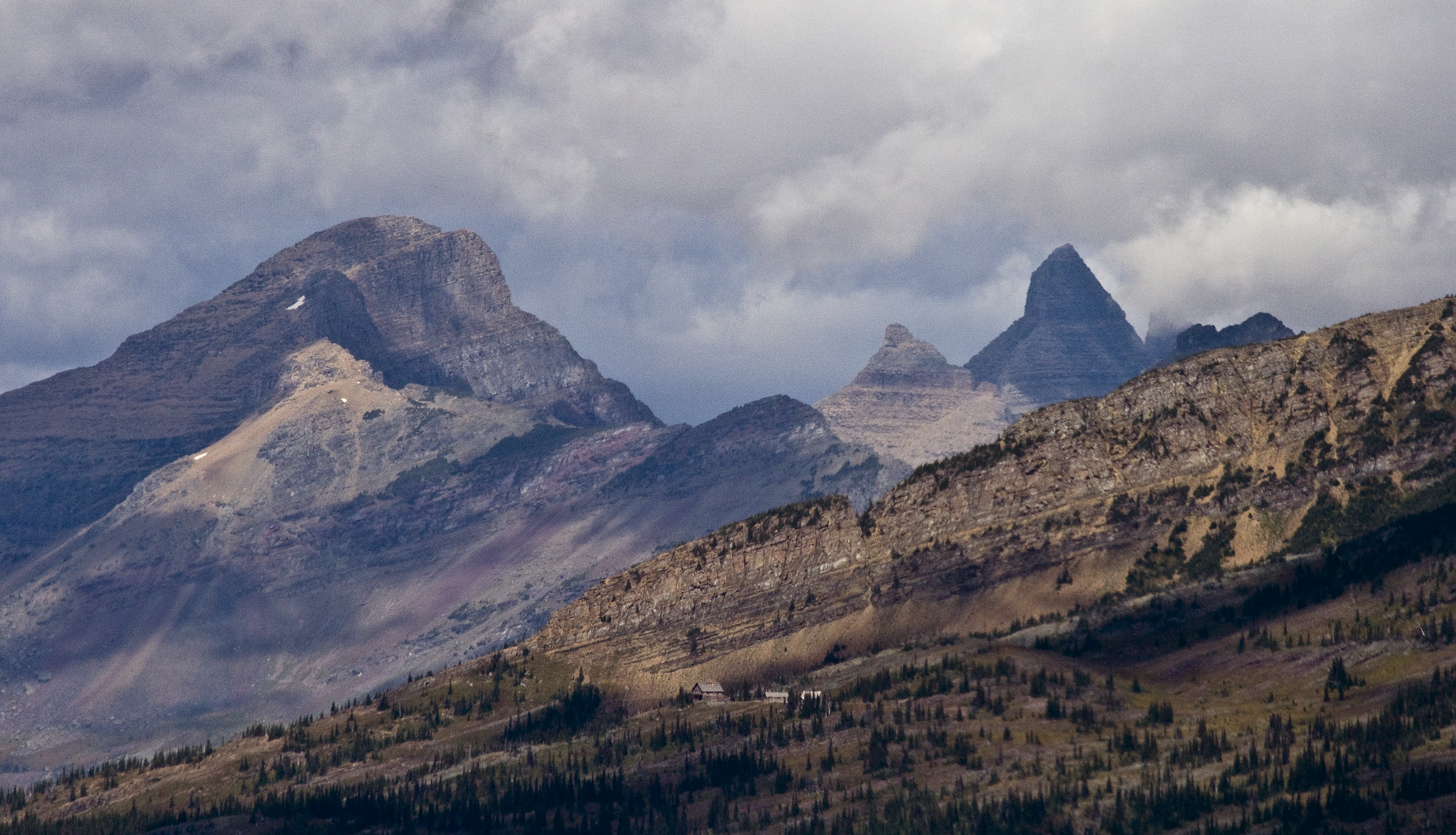
Surroundings. Chalet inthe bottom center

Surroundings. Chalet inthe near center
