= Howe Ridge Fire =

2018 wildfire in Glacier National Park in Montana

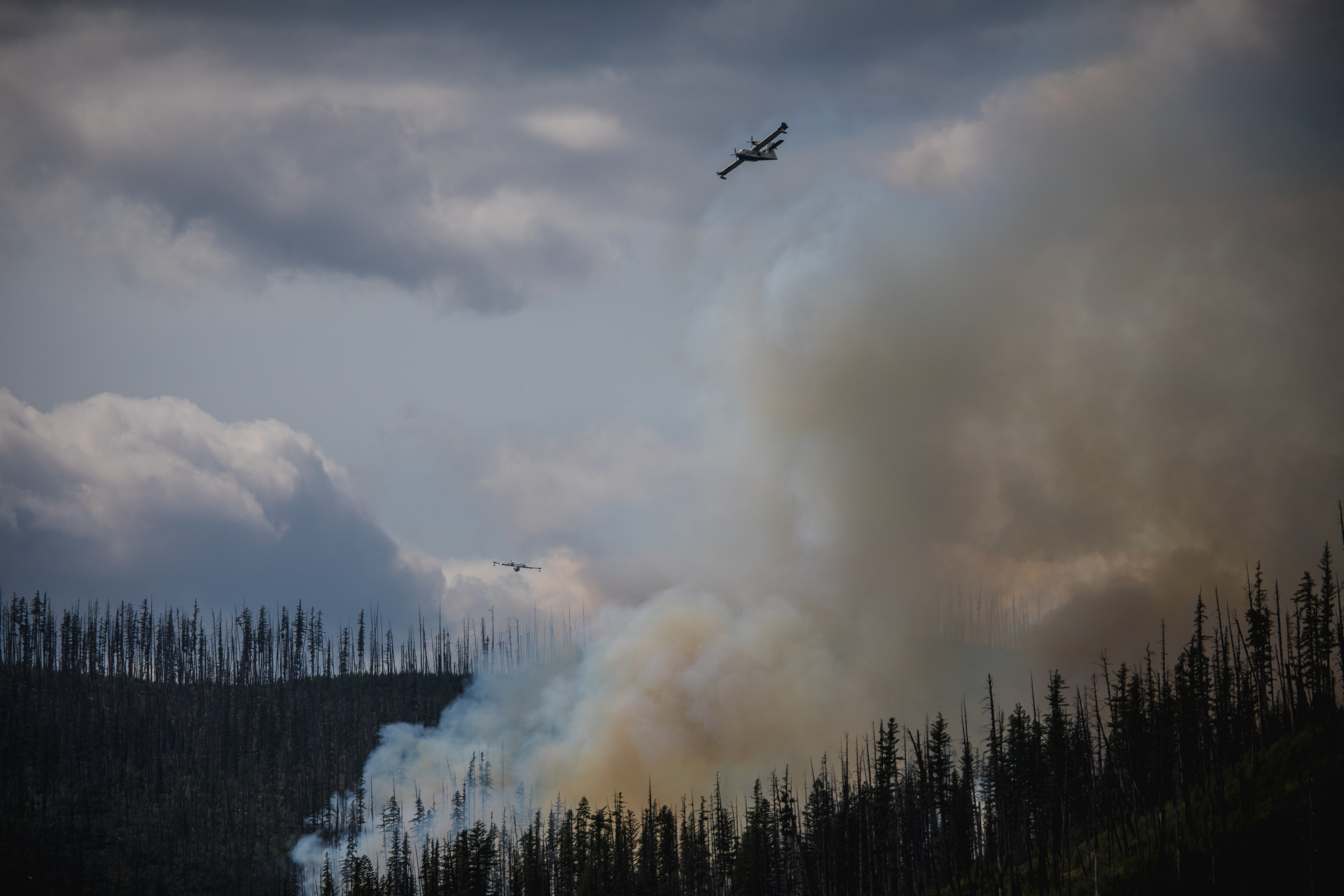
- CL-215 Scooper plane over the Howe Ridge Fire dropping water
- Date: August 11 - November 3, 2018; 7:15PM
- Location: Glacier National Park, Flathead County, Montana, United States
- Coordinates: 48.643°N 113.916°W

Statistics
- Burned area: 14,522 acres (5,877 ha)
- Land use: Forest

Impacts
- Deaths: 0
- Injuries: 0
- Structures destroyed: 13 residences and 14 more minor structures

Ignition
- Cause: Lightning

The Howe Ridge Fire was a wildfire in Glacier National Park in the U.S. state of Montana. Ignited by a thunderstorm on the evening of August 11, 2018, the fire was located on the northwest side of Lake McDonald. Several other fires were also started near the park due to the storm. On August 12 National Park Service officials issued a mandatory evacuation of private cabins and federally owned properties including the Lake McDonald Lodge complex which was temporarily closed. On August 13, National Park officials then closed the 32 miles (51 km) of the Going-to-the-Sun Road from Apgar Village to Logan Pass on the west side of the park after "extreme fire conditions" occurred the previous evening, threatening multiple structures. By August 14 the fire had spread to over 2,500 acres (1,000 ha). Though fire fighting conditions had improved by August 14, a preliminary damage assessment stated that at least seven private residences and several other structures belonging to the National Park Service had been consumed by the blaze at the Kelly's Camp Historic District and a number of other park service owned structures at the Wheeler residence. The Lake McDonald Ranger Station was saved by firefighters after its roof had been on fire. Thick haze and smoke obscured the fire on August 15 and while weather conditions remained favorable for fire growth, the haze kept the fire from spreading greatly. Haze and smoke made exact measurements of the amount of acreage burned difficult to determine, however infrared imagery indicated that the fire was 3,500 acres (1,400 ha) by August 16. By August 21 overnight infrared imagery indicated the fire had burned 9,672 acres (3,914 ha). On August 23 the fire had nearly 200 firefighters assigned to it and had burned 10,323 acres (4,178 ha) with only 10 percent of the fire contained. Full containment was not anticipated until November 1. Fire remained active along the northern flank between Mount Vaught and McDonald Creek as well as the southern margin on the west side of Lake McDonald and had spread to 11,519 acres (4,662 ha) by August 24 and then 12,435 acres (5,032 ha) by August 30. By August 28, cooler temperatures and widespread rain helped to keep the fire from expanding however a trend back to warmer and drier conditions was expected to provide conditions for future fire growth due to heavy fuels and terrain.

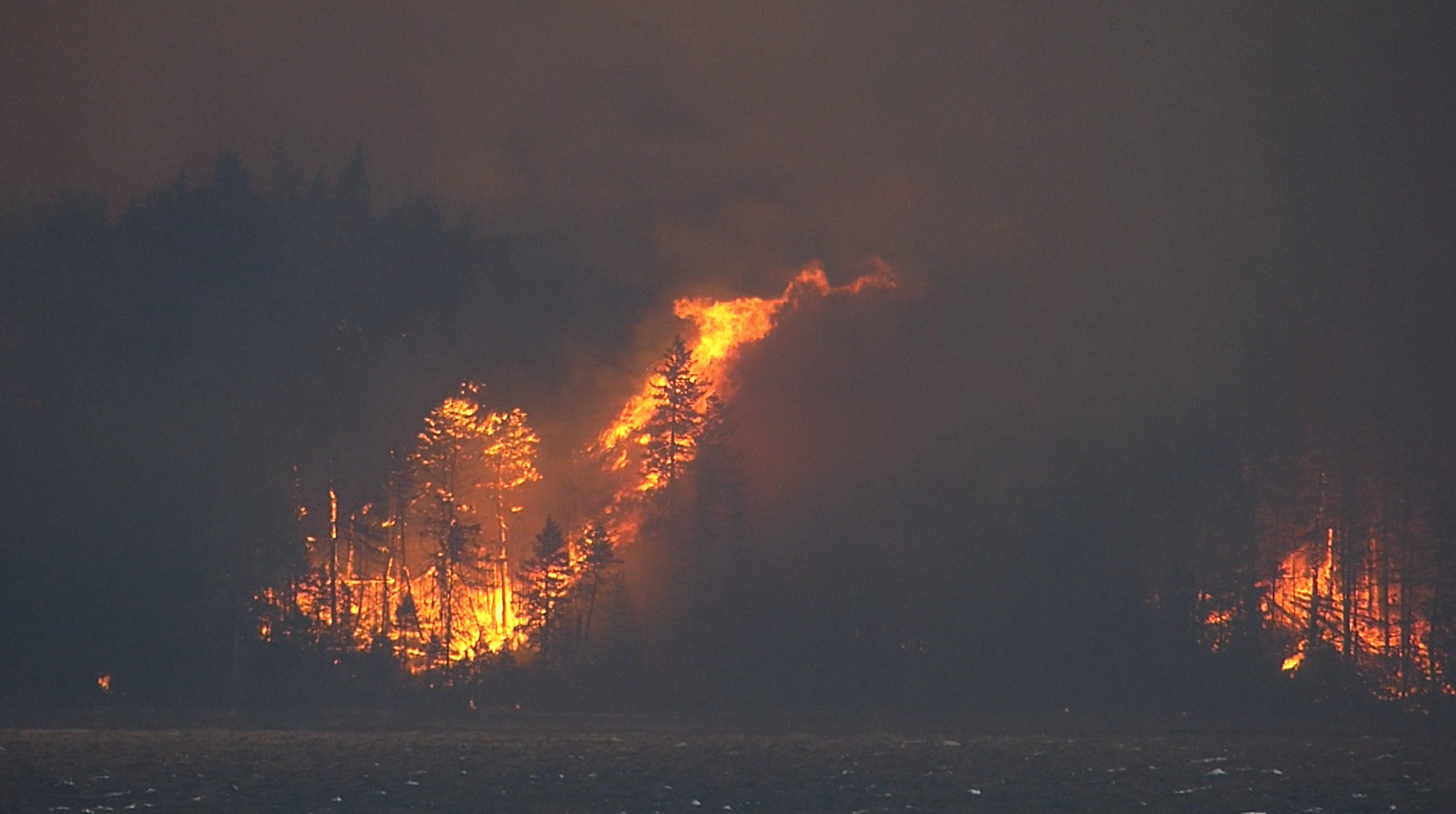
View of Howe Ridge Fire from Lake McDonald

On August 31 the National Park Service reported that 13 residences and 14 more minor structures had been lost due to the fire and the costs associated with fighting the fire had reached 6.6 million dollars. By September 9 the fire had shown some fire growth to 13,671 acres (5,532 ha), some of which was attributable to backfires that had been deliberately set by firefighters to prevent the fire from resuming uncontrolled expansion. By September 18, the fire was reduced to creeping and smoldering. A week earlier, officials reopened the western portions of the Going to the Sun Road but only for licensed shuttle services so they could transport tourists from Apgar Visitor center to Logan Pass. Officials stated the fire had cost over 12 million dollars since August 11 and 135 personnel were still assigned to the fire. On September 20 officials reopened the western portions of Going-to-the-Sun Road allowing private vehicles to travel the entire length of the scenic byway. By the end of September, the fire ceased to be spreading and most roads had reopened. The total cost of fighting the fire had exceeded 14 million dollars.
