= Night of the Grizzlies =

1969 nonfiction novel by Jack Olsen

- First edition (1969) cover
- Author: Jack Olsen
- Language: English
- Genre: Non fiction
- Publisher: G.P. Putnam's Sons
- Publication date: June 1, 1969
- Publication place: United States
- Media type: Print (Paperback & Hardback)
- Pages: 221pp (First facsimile edition, paperback, 1996)
- ISBN: 0-943972-48-5 (First facsimile edition, paperback, 1996)

Night of the Grizzlies (1969) is a book by Jack Olsen which details events surrounding the night of August 13, 1967, when two young women were separately attacked and killed in Glacier National Park, Montana, by grizzly bears. Both women, Julie Helgeson, 19, of Albert Lea, Minnesota, and Michele Koons, 19, of San Diego, California, died of their injuries.

== The attacks ==
The night of August 12–13 was marked by lightning, which led some to speculate the bears were agitated by the stormy weather. Other experts thought the bears may have mistaken the sleeping bags for food containers.

The first attack was reported around midnight at the Granite Park Chalet. Helgeson was camping with her boyfriend Roy Ducat approximately 1/4 mile (0.40 km) away from the Chalet; both Helgeson and Ducat were employed by the Glacier Park Lodge. Their campsite was close to the trail established by bears feeding on the Chalet's garbage. Ducat was awakened by Helgeson, who whispered a bear was nearby and they should stay as still as possible; despite this, the bear approached them and mauled them both. When the bear turned away from Ducat to Helgeson, he ran to a nearby group of campers for help; the bear dragged Helgeson into the woods as she screamed. Although she was eventually found alive 400 feet (120 m) from their original campsite, she later died of her wounds at the Chalet.

The second attack was reported around 4 AM at Trout Lake; Koons had gone camping there with four friends, and all five worked at the Lake McDonald Lodge. That area was known to be the territory of a sow bear that fed on garbage at Kelly's Camp, a privately owned facility that predated the establishment of the park, nearby at the north end of Lake McDonald; the bear was characterized as "not quite right" and had previously chased a group of Girl Scouts the week prior to the attacks. One camper awoke with the bear sniffing her sleeping bag, but remained still and the bear moved on; when the bear was investigating Koons, Koons woke and screamed; the other four campers were able to escape by climbing trees, but the zipper on Koons's sleeping bag was stuck and the bear dragged her approximately 300 feet (91 m) away from the campsite. The frightened campers stayed in the trees for more than two hours and ran to the nearest ranger station at dawn, where they reported the attack.

Relevant locations in Glacier National Park
1 Granite Park Chalet campsite (Helgeson)
2 Trout Lake campsite (Koons)
3 Kelly's Camp

On orders from park management, rangers were armed and told to shoot any bear they found at Trout Lake and Granite Park Chalet. In total, four bears were shot and killed by Monday, August 14; the first two, which had become habituated to rummage through the Granite Park Chalet trash, were killed on August 13. Two rangers shot a bear at a ranger station near Trout Lake on August 14; a postmortem examination of the stomach contents conclusively identified it as the bear that had killed Koons. The bear was emaciated and was also found to have glass in its gums. The last bear was killed at the Chalet; she was a sow with two cubs, and was blamed for Helgeson's death because of the presence of blood on her claws. During the shooting, one of the cubs was injured but escaped.

=== Causes and legacy ===
Several park rangers had previously filed a report after observing on August 9 that bears were feeding on garbage generated by the Granite Park Chalet and campers; this was possibly a deliberate attempt to attract tourists, as the main attraction at the Chalet were the grizzlies. Although a gas-fired incinerator had been installed in 1966, it was inadequately sized, and the caretaker resumed dumping garbage in the gully behind the Chalet shortly after opening for the summer season. The caretaker was instructed not to feed the bears, but he felt those instructions were only being stated pro forma and after checking with the concessionaire, kept the practice.

Seasonal residents at Kelly's Camp had reported seeing an "emaciated and scrawny" grizzly bear, that was unusually aggressive, foraging for food among their garbage in June 1967; the bear had moved on to Trout Lake by August. The campground at Trout Lake "looked like a battlefield strewn with K rations", according to Olsen; rangers took nearly twenty bags of garbage out of the site by helicopter a few weeks later.

One theory postulated the bears were attracted by odors associated with menstruation, and brochures were circulated to warn menstruating women from entering bear territory. No anecdotal evidence was provided to substantiate the theory, and a 1991 study demonstrated that "[n]o bear showed appreciable interest in menstrual odors regardless of the bear's age, sex, reproductive status, or the time of year."

Olsen's book examines the most plausible explanation of the unlikely dual attacks since no fatal grizzly attack had ever been recorded in the park's 57-year history prior to that night. One specialist at the time calculated the odds were greater than 1 in a million for a single attack but the odds of two separate attacks in a 4-hour time span were beyond measure; these odds were calculated based on the 57-year history of no fatal attacks. However future events would show grizzly attacks to become more common, as Olson explains, because of increased human presence in wilderness areas and decreased habitat for bears to live in, reaching a critical tipping point in the summer of 1967.

As a result of the attacks, the first modern bear management policies were implemented, installing bear-proof garbage cans, separating campsite cooking areas from sleeping areas, stringing wire cables to allow campers to hang their food, and establishing a permitting process to track and limit the number of campers in the park.

The book's name has become the popular name for the maulings of August 13. A documentary of the events was first shown on PBS in May 2010.

== Publishing history ==
The text was originally published in May 1969 as a three-part article for Sports Illustrated as "The Grizzly Bear Murder Case". A 37-page prologue was added for the book.

- — (1969). Night of the Grizzlies (1st, hardback ed.). G. P. Putnam's Sons. ISBN 0399105824.
- — (1971). Night of the Grizzlies (mass market paperback ed.). Signet. ISBN 978-0-451-12304-6.
- — (1996). Night of the Grizzlies (reprint, paperback ed.). Homestead. ISBN 978-0943972480.

== Reception ==
Kirkus Reviews called the book "the kind of horror story you can't put down."

The narrative pacing and graphic descriptions were said to influence later genre fiction, including First Blood (David Morrell, 1972), The Rats (James Herbert, 1974), and Off Season (Jack Ketchum, 1980).

== See also ==
- List of fatal bear attacks in North America
