= Bull Head Lodge and Studio =

- U.S. National Register of Historic Places
- Location within Montana Location within the United States
- Location: Off Going-to-the-Sun-Rd., Apgar, Montana
- Coordinates: 48°31′58″N 113°59′45″W
- Area: less than one acre
- Built by: Cruger, E.J.; Sibley, Martin
- NRHP reference No.: 84002465
- Added to NRHP: February 6, 1984

Bull Head Lodge and Studio, located off Going-to-the-Sun Road near Apgar in Flathead County, Montana was listed on the National Register of Historic Places in 1984.

The lodge and studio are two contributing log buildings at the southern end of Lake McDonald in Glacier National Park. The lodge was initially named Kootenai Lodge to honor the indigenous people who first lived in the area.

The cabin named Bull Head Lodge was built in 1905 or 1906, on land purchased by Russell from Dimon Apgar. The property was a private inholding within the Glacier National Park when it was formed in 1910. It was Charles M. Russell's summer home, where he hosted artist friends to paint and sketch landscapes and scenery of the park. Russell composed a number of gnomic sculptures using found objects such as wood and moss from the park.

The property was owned by the Lundgren family until July 2026 when it was purchased by David J. Lesar and his wife Sherry Lesar for $6 million dollars. The couple plans to restore the cabin and open it up for tours.

== See also ==
- Charles M. Russell House and Studio: Russell's home in Great Falls, Montana. It is also on the National Register of Historic places.
- National Register of Historic Places listings in Flathead County, Montana
