= Lee Creek Snowshoe Cabin =

- U.S. National Register of Historic Places
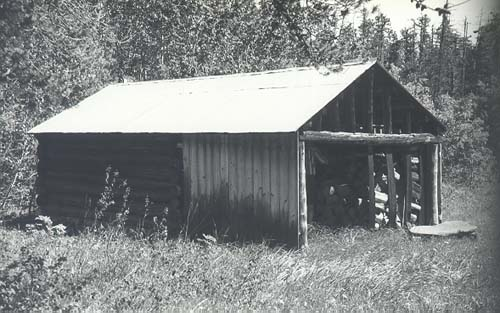

- Location within Montana Location within the United States
- Location: NE corner of Glacier National Park, Glacier National Park, Montana
- Coordinates: 48°59′10″N 113°37′20″W
- Area: less than one acre
- Built: 1925
- Architectural style: NPS Rustic
- MPS: Glacier National Park MPS
- NRHP reference No.: 01000203
- Added to NRHP: March 2, 2001

The Lee Creek Snowshoe Cabin was built in Glacier National Park in 1925–27 by Austin Swikert as a shelter for winter hikers. The log structure consists of a single room with a wood floor, unfinished walls and roof. A trap door in the floor provides access to a small cellar food cache. There is a woodstove with a metal chimney.

The cabin was primarily used by rangers on patrol from the Belly River ranger station. The location is close to the Chief Mountain International Highway, built in 1935. It was, however, a remote place when the cabin was built between 1925 and 1927 by Austin Weikert.

== See also ==
- Kootenai Creek Snowshoe Cabin
- Lincoln Creek Snowshoe Cabin
