= Lincoln Creek Snowshoe Cabin =

- U.S. National Register of Historic Places
- Location within Montana Location within the United States
- Nearest city: Glacier National Park, West Glacier, Montana
- Coordinates: 48°29′53″N 113°52′41″W
- Area: less than one acre
- Built: 1931
- Architectural style: Rustic
- MPS: Glacier National Park MRA
- NRHP reference No.: 01000037
- Added to NRHP: February 2, 2001

The Lincoln Creek Snowshoe Cabin, built in 1931, is a cabin in Glacier National Park. It has also been known as Lincoln Creek Cabin and as Building Inventory No. 617.

== See also ==
- Kootenai Creek Snowshoe Cabin
- Lee Creek Snowshoe Cabin
