= Historic Flight Foundation =

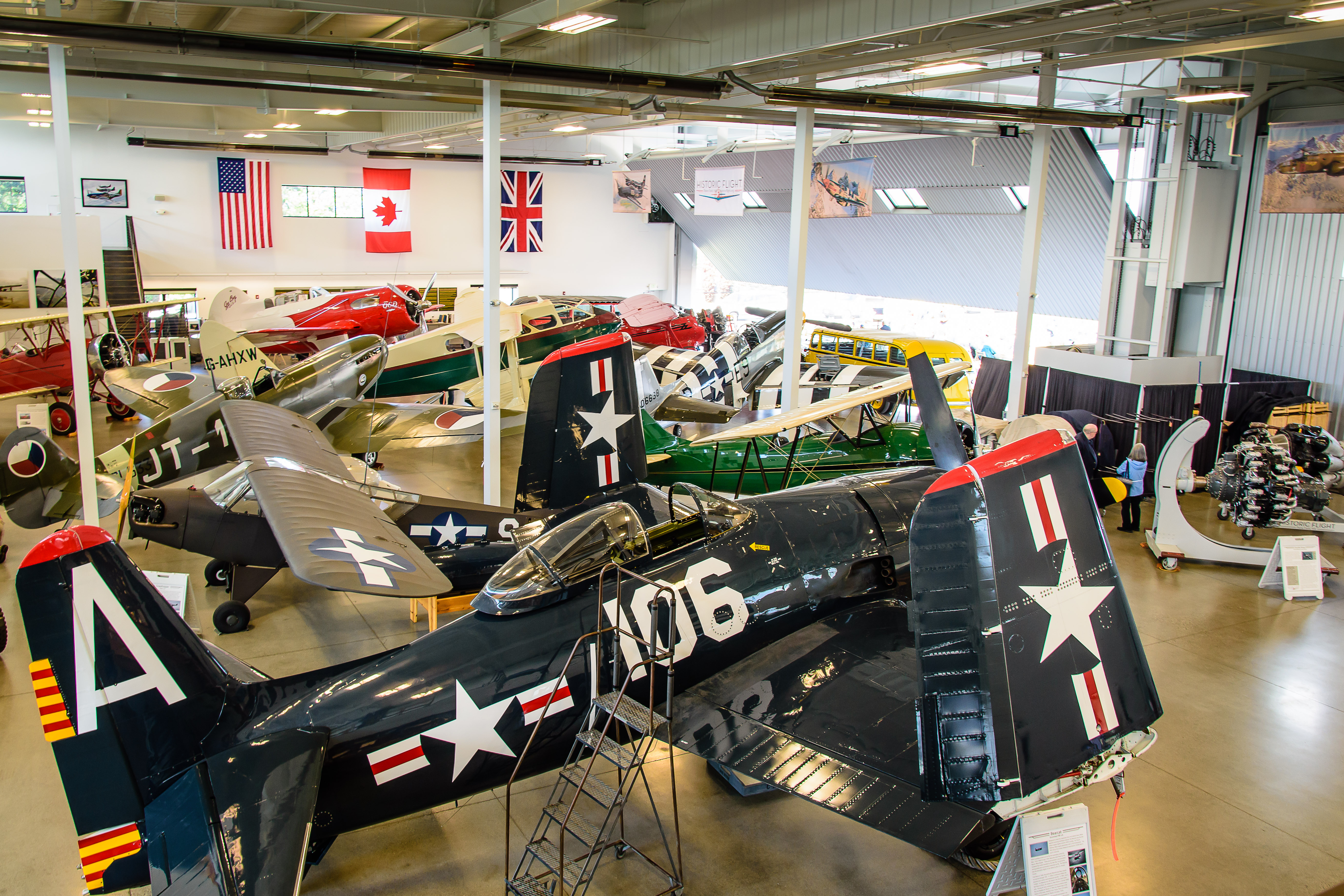
- Historic Flight Foundation aircraft on display.

- Location in Washington
- Established: 2010
- Dissolved: 2024
- Location: Felts Field, Spokane, Washington
- Coordinates: 47.6797°N 117.3228°W
- Type: Aviation museum
- Founder: John Sessions
- Website: http://historicflight.org

The Historic Flight Foundation (HFF) was an aviation museum located at Felts Field in Spokane, Washington. The museum collected, restored, and flew historic aircraft from the period between Charles Lindbergh's solo Atlantic crossing in 1927 and the first commercial flight of the Boeing 707 in 1957, a 30-year period during which airplanes evolved from relatively simple wood and fabric biplanes to commercial jets. The museum was previously located at Paine Field in Mukilteo, Washington, but relocated to Spokane during the spring of 2020 due to the presence of commercial air service at Paine Field.

The museum aircraft had been fully restored to flying condition, and flew regularly at monthly summer Fly Days, HFF's September Vintage Aircraft Weekend, and Paine Field's Aviation Day in May. The aircraft also fly at air displays throughout the Western United States and Canada.

HFF hosts educational programs throughout the year. This includes a STEM program for primary through high school students, historic airplane ground schools, and flight training in historic aircraft. Speakers from HFF's Speaker's Bureau regularly present educational programs about aviation topics and airplanes in the collection.

HFF also restored historic aircraft back to flying condition. Some of this restoration work was done in-house at HFF's hangar where visitors can watch as the work is performed. Other restoration work was done by outside organizations that specialize in restoration of specific aircraft types. Two of Historic Flight's aircraft won awards for their restoration work at the National Aviation Heritage Invitational at the California Capital Airshow in September 2017.

== History ==
John T. Sessions founded the Historic Flight Foundation and began acquiring the foundation's aircraft in 2003. In 2006 the museum began planning the construction of the hangar at Paine Field that initially housed the foundation's aircraft collection. HFF's hangar opened its doors to the public in March 2010.

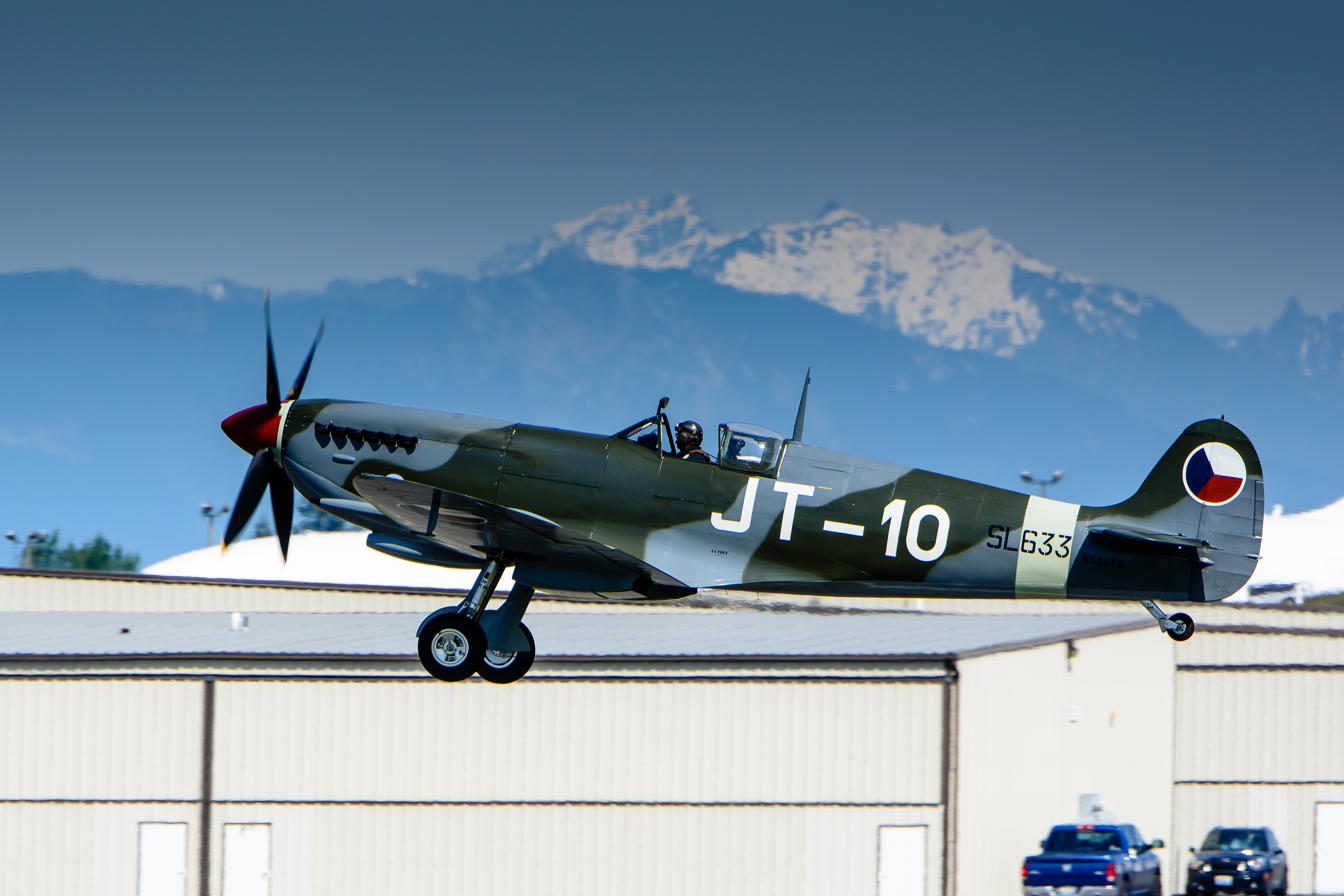
Historic Flight Foundation Supermarine Spitfire LF Mark IXe

The museum acquired a de Havilland DH.89 Dragon Rapide in May 2017. The airplane was damaged in an accident in 2018 that injured Sessions, and resulted in the amputation of his foot.

With the collection of aircraft outgrowing the space available at Paine Field, Historic Flight opened a second location at Felts Field in Spokane on December 17, 2019. The museum initially intended to maintain both their Mukilteo and Spokane locations, with the latter initially holding eight aircraft. However, with the museum unable to cope with the demands of then-new commercial air service at Paine Field, it elected to move all of its collection to Spokane during the spring of 2020, with the Mukilteo location reduced to maintenance and restoration duties.

After being forced to close due to the COVID-19 pandemic, it was able to reopen in 2021.

The museum was implicated in a 2022 lawsuit filed in Williston, North Dakota, against one of Sessions' companies by UMB Bank, which had loaned funds to the company for the construction of an apartment complex; a jury determined that the company fraudulently transferred funds to Sessions' other ventures, including the museum, and declared that those ventures were eligible for asset seizure due to the fraud as they awarded a $20.1 million judgement to the bank. The museum's Spitfire was damaged in an accident in July 2023. A month later, the museum announced it would be temporarily closing due to the lawsuit. However, by September the museum's B-25 had been sold by its receiver. In December, the court ruled that additional aircraft could be sold. By April 2024, all of the museum's aircraft had been sold to pay off Sessions' legal debts. The museum's hangar was repurposed as a storage facility during liquidation; in the meantime, the Spokane Airport Board denied Sessions' attempt to revive the museum and use of a different hangar as an event center.

== Hangar ==
When Historic Flight was located in Mukilteo, its aircraft collection was housed in a working hangar at Paine Field, which is home to Boeing's manufacturing plant for 747, 767, 777 and 787 aircraft. The hangar at Felts Field in Spokane is larger than the Paine Field hangar, allowing the museum to store all of their aircraft indoors. At both locations, visitors could walk among the collection, watch mechanics maintain and restore aircraft, and watch aircraft takeoff and land on their respective airport's main runway. The collection also included aviation artifacts such as military uniforms and vintage flight suits, as well as several vintage cars and buses, including a 1927 Cadillac Touring Phaeton car in which President Franklin Delano Roosevelt toured Glacier National Park on August 5, 1934. The automobile collection featured two "Jammer" touring buses—one from Yellowstone Park and one from Glacier National Park.

== Collection ==
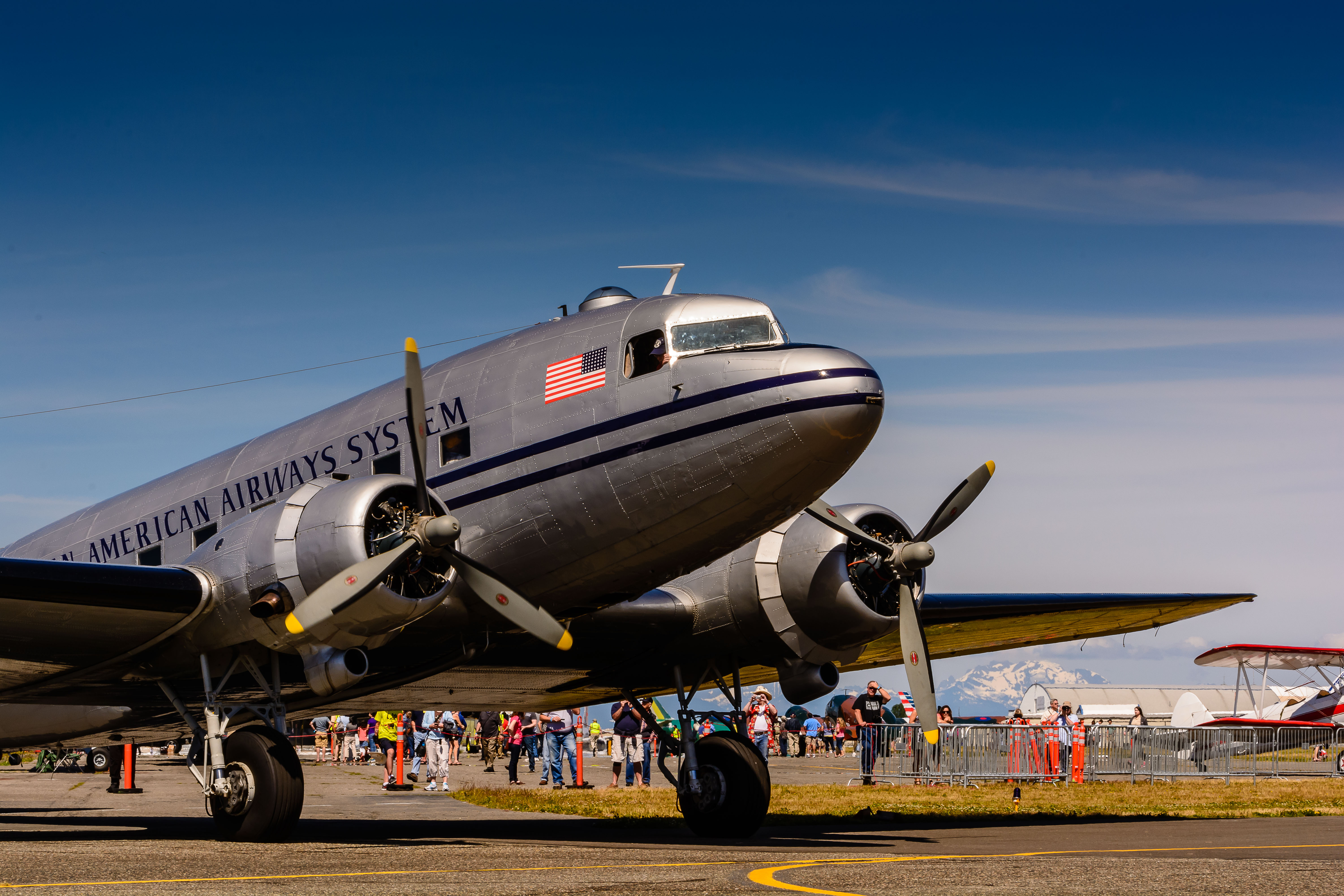
Historic Flight Foundation Douglas DC-3

The museum's collection included the following historic aircraft.

- Beech Staggerwing D17S
- Boeing-Stearman Model 75 in silver USAAF markings
- Canadair T-33 Silver Star
- de Havilland DHC-2 Beaver Two aircraft; one on wheels with period USAF markings, one on amphibious floats in civil colors.
- de Havilland DH-89 Dragon Rapide
- Douglas DC-3 in Pan American colors
- Grumman F8F Bearcat
- Hamilton H-47 (the sole airworthy example) in Northwest Airlines colors
- North American B-25D Mitchell in RAF colors
- North American P-51B Mustang
- North American T-6A
- Piper L-4J
- Supermarine Spitfire Mk. IXe
- Travel Air 4000
- Waco UPF-7

The collection's Douglas DC-3 was manufactured at the Douglas Aircraft Company's Long Beach plant as one of only 300 DC-3s specifically designed to "fly the hump"—the eastern end of the Himalayan Mountains—during World War II.

== See also ==
- List of aerospace museums
