= Ace Powell =

American artist

- Ace Powell, c. 1972
- Born: Asa Lynn Powell; April 3, 1912; Tularosa, New Mexico, U.S.
- Died: January 25, 1978 (aged 65); Kalispell, Montana, U.S.
- Education: Self-taught (Influenced by C. M. Russell); University of Montana
- Known for: Painting and sculpture
- Movement: Realism and Impressionism
- Spouses: Helena Betty Sperry (m. 1938–1941) Audrey Scott (m. 1946) Nancy McLaughlin (m. 1952–1964) Thelma Conner (m. 1965)
- Awards: The Ace Powell Award

Asa Lynn "Ace" Powell (April 3, 1912 – January 25, 1978) was an American painter, sculptor, and etcher of genre scenes and imagery relating to Indians, cowboys, horses, and wildlife. His artwork was influenced by that of fellow Montana artist Charles M. Russell. Powell's lifetime body of work consists of between 12,000 and 15,000 artworks. Although he preferred working with oil paints, he also produced a large number of watercolor paintings and drawings, as well as a number of works in bronze, terracotta, and wood.

== Early life ==
Powell was born in Tularosa, New Mexico, on April 3, 1912. In 1913, at age one, his family moved to Montana where he spent his formative years in Apgar. His father worked as a wrangler and guide in Glacier National Park. Powell attended high school in Browning, on the Blackfeet Indian Reservation. While in his early 20s, Powell took a job as a wrangler on the Bar X5 ranch near Babb, Montana, and handled horses for the Glacier Park concessionaire. As a young man Powell, whose parents were friends of Charles M. Russell, made the acquaintance of Russell whose summer home, Bull Head Lodge, was located in Apgar. He took a few private lessons from the great master, but for the most part Powell was a self-taught artist through trial and error.

=== Marriages ===
When Powell's first wife Helena—who was born in Smolensk, Russia, in 1908—died during the bitterly cold winter of 1941, he joined the Army Air Corps and worked in a defense plant. Thereafter he was in the plastic figurine business in Yakima, Washington. He married a second time around 1946 to Audrey Scott, the union producing a son, Eddie. The marriage, however, would be short-lived as the couple was prone to fighting and she eventually left him. Powell's heavy drinking may have been a factor in their parting of the sheets. In 1952 he married fellow artist Nancy McLaughlin and the couple made their home in Hungry Horse, a few miles east of Bad Rock Canyon, and operated a combination studio and gallery. A son, Dave Powell—who would go on to be a fine artist in his own right—was born to the couple. It was during this period that Powell gained much of his reputation and began to garner a following of collectors who would patronize him for the rest of his career. Their gallery/studio would burn to the ground in 1964, and shortly thereafter he and Nancy divorced. His fourth marriage, in 1965, was to Thelma Conner and they made their home in Kalispell.

=== College at University of Montana ===
In about 1952 he attended the University of Montana at Missoula on the G.I. Bill. He found that the university's art department stressed abstract art, which wasn't a style particularly well suited for a realist painter such as himself. One of his teachers told him that he couldn't make a living as an artist and would have to teach art. When another instructor revealed that as a first-year teacher he was making $4,400, Powell replied, "Well, I'm an alcoholic and I was drunk half of the time last year and still make $7,500 so I've got no business here!" With that he quit. He subsequently took a correspondence art course and learned to organize the things he had been taught over the years into formal presentations.

== Career ==
During his career, Powell produced between 12,000 and 15,000 works of art. His preferred medium was oil painting, however he also worked extensively with watercolors. He also executed a number of works in bronze, terracotta, and wood. With regard to painting, Powell said: "I see a scene in my mind and I put it down on canvas. I want it to look like it came from the land. If at all possible, I try to get a crisp feeling into my paintings. Sometimes I get something into a canvas that is just right, then I work around it".

In 1962 a Cincinnati, Ohio, couple took their one and only vacation to Glacier Park. They noticed a man in a cowboy hat painting at his easel near the Lake McDonald Lodge. Impressed by the artist's work, they commissioned Powell on the spot to produce a large 4x8 foot mural painting featuring Lake McDonald. Long after the buyers were deceased, a deal was consummated in 2013 by a partnership consisting of Freedom Bank in Columbia Falls, Glacier Park National Fund, and Kalispell art dealer Kevin Moore to buy the painting at an undisclosed price from the unnamed couple's daughter who wished to remain anonymous and still lived in Cincinnati. The painting had been purchased for the purpose of covering a bay window at the couple's Cincinnati home. “They would rather look at Glacier National Park every day” than the view outside their window, Moore said. After being on display for a time in the Freedom Bank lobby, the painting was eventually donated to the Glacier National Park Fund and was relocated to Lake McDonald Lodge. As a fundraiser, 100 giclée oil-on-canvas reproductions were later sold by the Ace Powell Gallery at a price of $395 each, with a number being sold to Kalispell businesses.

In a 1978 article written by Dr. Van Kirke Nelson for Art West Magazine, Nelson cites Powell as saying, "I have been more fortunate than most, helped and have been helped, painted some great paintings and some terrible paintings. There were times when I thought the price I was charging was close to larceny—so I have never regretted someone else making a dollar on my paintings as I'll get it back from them next time. I've shaken hands with the devil, perhaps more than most, but the good Lord has seen fit to keep me around for a bit longer".

== Death and legacy ==
Powell died on January 25, 1978, in Kalispell, Montana. Upon his death, many dealers holding unsold Powell canvases immediately doubled their prices. He is best remembered as one of finest painters of American western art in the 20th century. Some of his works are on display at the Hockaday Museum in Kalispell, Montana.

== Awards and honors ==
Note: This list is incomplete.

- The Ace Powell Award, named in Powell's honor as the award's first recipient, is given by the Western Art Association of Ellensburg to an artist who has made a significant contribution toward historical western art heritage or who has encouraged or supported western artists in an outstanding manner.

== Signature example ==
Powell signed nearly all of his works with this mark showing an ace of diamonds playing card and "Powell".

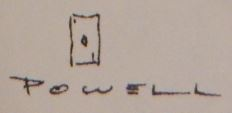
