= Kelly's Camp Historic District =

Historic district in Montana, United States

- U.S. National Register of Historic Places
- U.S. Historic district
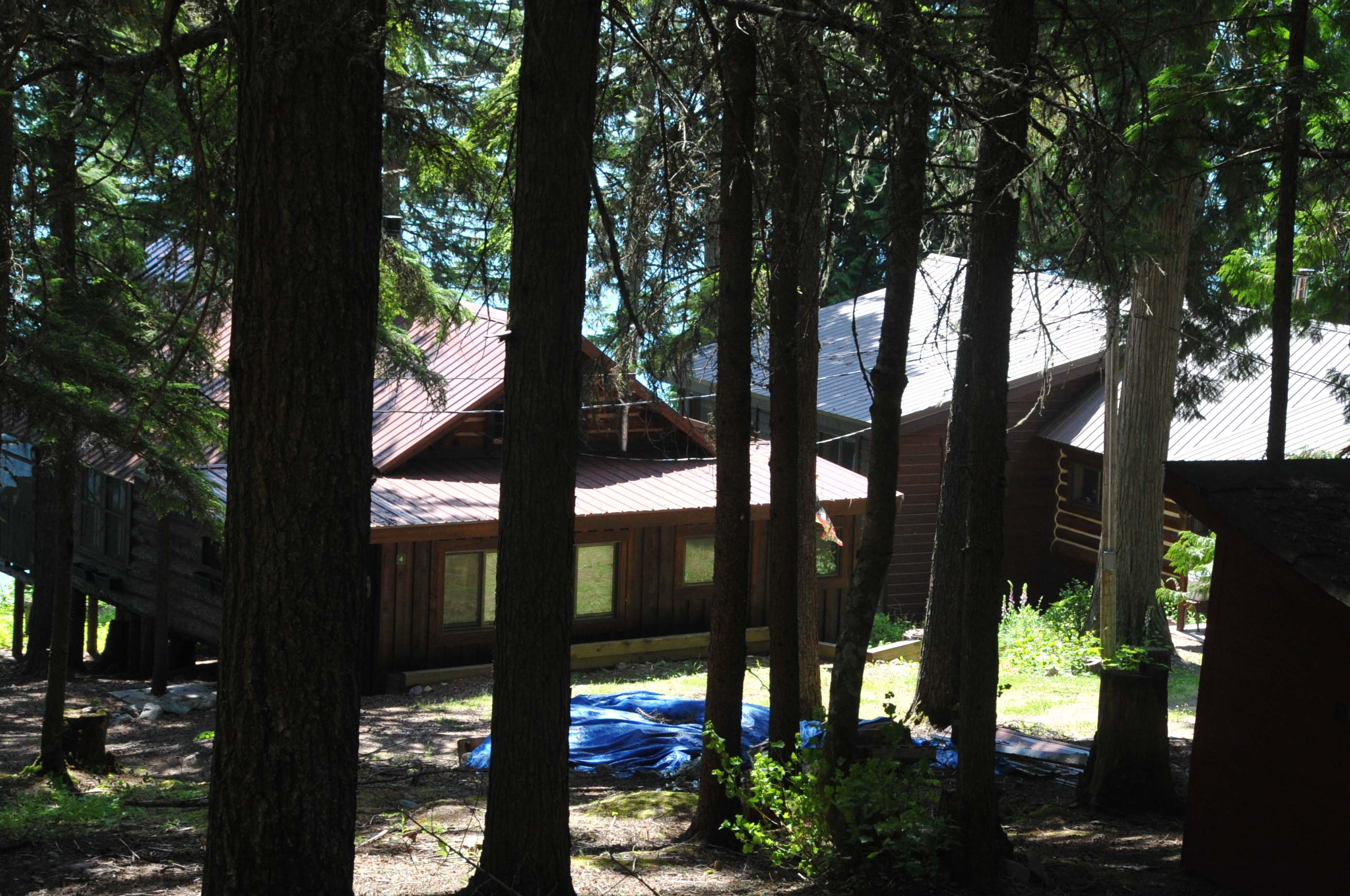

- Location within Montana Location within the United States
- Nearest city: Lake McDonald, Montana
- Coordinates: 48°37′36″N 113°54′6″W
- Area: 6.5 acres (2.6 ha)
- Built: 1894
- Architect: Frank Kelly, Verne Kelly
- Architectural style: Rustic
- MPS: Recreational Camps on Lake McDonald, MT
- NRHP reference No.: 08001224
- Added to NRHP: December 23, 2009

Kelly's Camp is a small district of vacation cabins on the west shore of Lake McDonald in Glacier National Park, Montana, USA. Kelly's Camp consists of twelve log buildings along the western shore of the lake. The structures were notable for being one of the most extensive summer cabin enclaves remaining in the park. Early reports following the advance of the Howe Ridge Fire on August 12, 2018 are that nine or ten structures have been destroyed.

== History ==
The present area of the camp was originally the homestead of Frank Kelly, who staked his claim in March 1894. Kelly married Emmeline "Liney" Haworth in 1897 and the family spent some of their summers at the camp. In 1906 Frank Kelly launched the Emmeline, a 35-foot (11 m) motorized launch, which he hired out for visitors to the lake. Kelly partnered with Orville Denny around 1912 and operated the Cassie D., then went into business with John Lewis, operator of the Glacier Hotel on the other side of the lake. They operated the Ethel and the Lewtana. Kelly operated the boating business until 1921, when he sold out, but bought the Emmeline back and operated it until 1936.

Kelly had difficulty maintaining his land claim after the park was established in 1910, and needed a special patent granted by Congress in 1914 to own his 55-acre (22 ha) property. During the 1920s Kelly started building cabins for rent on his property. In 1922 he sold two parcels which financed later development. Fannie Hollingsworth bought both parcels totaling 11 acres (4.5 ha) and built the "Hollybourne" cabin starting in the fall of 1926, together with her daughter Cecilia Hollingsworth Chadbourne and Cecilia's husband Horace. In 1930 Kelly sold another 17.87 acres (7.23 ha) to Horace Chadbourne. Chadbourne developed the land as a tent camp, which was also called Hollybourne. In 1934 both Hollybourne sites were sold by Cecilia to the government in return for a life estate.

By 1930 Kelly had built nine or ten cabins for rental and Frank and Liney Kelly lived in the Big House all year. Other cabins included Hollybourne, the Sun Cabin, the Bay Cabin and the Halfway Cabin. Horace Chadbourne and Frank Kelley cleared a road grade from the Lake McDonald Ranger Station to the camp in 1933, which was completed by the Park Service. Both Emmeline and Frank Kelly died within a day of each other of pneumonia in January 1935. Vern Kelly, their son, took over the camp, although bookings declined during the remainder of the 1930s and during World War II. The camp revived after the war and was a popular family resort. Vern Kelly died in 1958, and his widow Helen sold a parcel to Wendell Hammond, who built two cabins. In 1963 Helen sold another parcel to Edward and Mary Jane Theefs, who built a cabin. Starting in 1964 the existing cabins were sold to tenured camp patrons. In 1988 a Kelly descendant sold the Big House and one cabin to the Park Service in exchange for a life estate. Property changed hands through the 2000s. Since the 2018 fire several of the cabins have been rebuilt by the descendants of the original and new owners and

The site was almost completely destroyed during the Howe Ridge Fire in August 2018, which burned seven of the privately owned residences, and the Park Service-owned cabin and main camp house, leaving just one cabin standing.

== Description ==
The cabins are mostly small log structures with gables facing the lake. The Big House was built in 1910. The largest structure in the camp, it was set back in the trees near the northern end of the camp. It was built in two phases, both of 1-1/2 stories. The older section had a large room used as an office, with a living area and kitchen in the newer section. Sleeping rooms were upstairs.

Cabin 00 was built between 1925 and 1930. It is the only cabin with gables on the sides, and is the northernmost, with a long porch facing the lake. There is a large room downstairs, with an adjoining bedroom covered by a sleeping loft. Kitchen and bathroom facilities are in an extension to the rear. Near the Big House and Cabin 00, there is an open-walled shop, built between 1910 and 1920, a 1927 generator house with an operating hydroelectric generator system, a 1910 woodshed, a 1905-1910 shower and laundry house and a root cellar from the same period.

Cabins 1 through 8 are arranged along the beach. All are of log construction and have gables facing the lake, with minor variations in size and arrangement. Bathroom additions were added to the rear of each cabin after 1970. Most of the original shingled roofs have been replaced with metal to reduce fire danger. Cabins 1 through 4 remain as contributing structures. Cabins 5 and 6 have been altered and are no longer considered contributing structures. Cabins 7 and 8 retain their integrity. Other structures include an open chapel, built about 1945 and a series of privies associated with cabins 00, 2, 4, 5 and 6.

== Designation ==
Kelly's Camp was listed on the National Register of Historic Places on December 23, 2009.
