= Hockaday Museum =

American art museum

Coordinates: 48°11′46″N 114°18′36″W

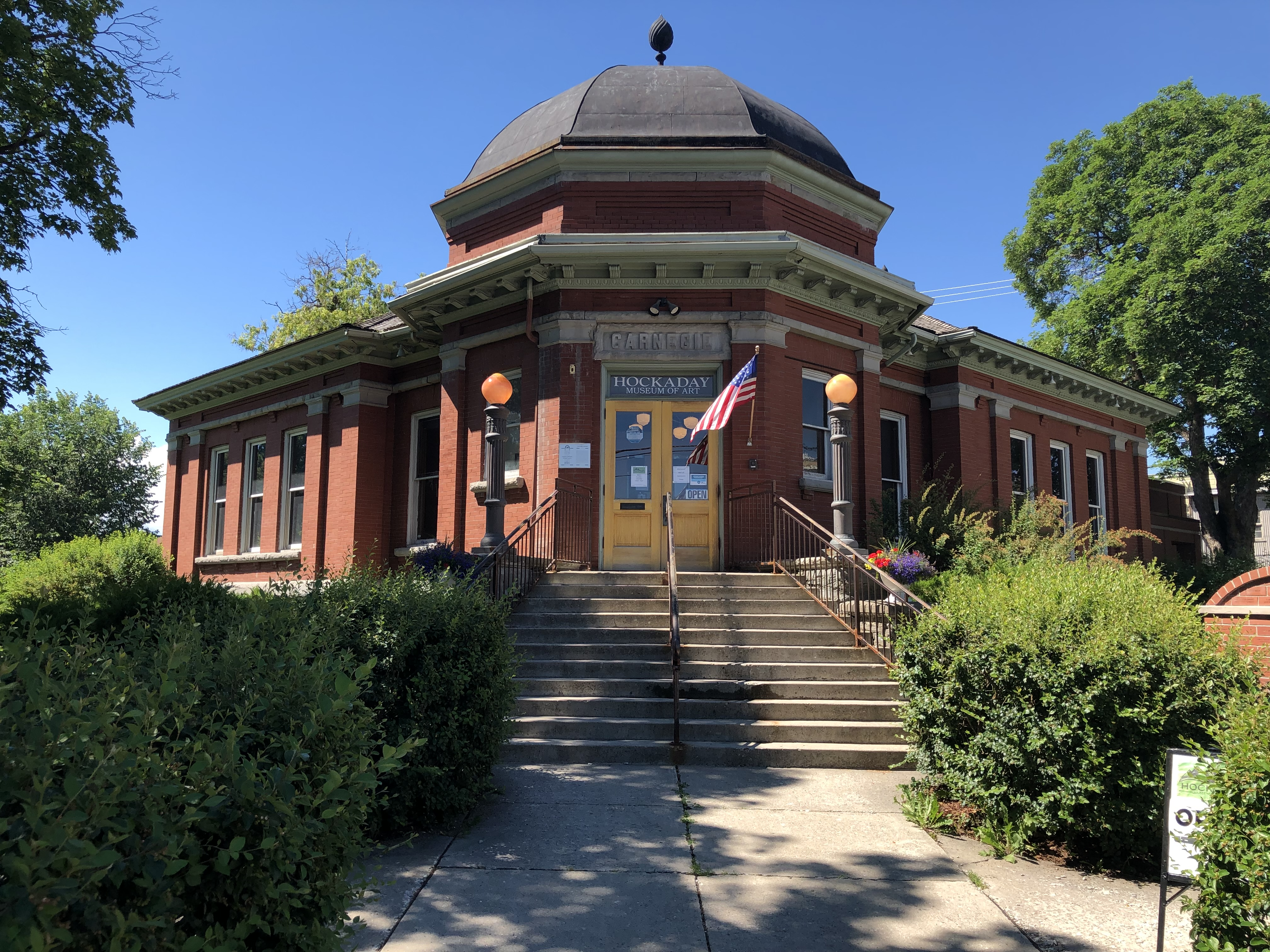
The auspicious entrance to the Hockaday Museum of Art

The Hockaday Museum of Art in Kalispell, Montana, is an American art museum which focuses on preservation of art and history pertaining to Glacier National Park and the state of Montana.

== History ==
=== 1967-1998 ===
The Hockaday Museum, originally called the Hockaday Center, was opened to the public on February 10, 1969. The museum is named after commercial artist Hugh Hockaday.

=== 1998-Present ===
Today the Hockaday Museum is housed in the Carnegie Library Building. The building was constructed in 1904 with funding provided by Andrew Carnegie. The Carnegie Library Building is located near Main Street in downtown Kalispell. The museum also features a store called the Carnegie Corner Gift Gallery which sells original local artwork.

== Art collection ==
The Hockaday Museum's permanent art collection focuses extensively on art and artists local to the Flathead Valley, Glacier National Park and Montana. Artists displayed in the museum's permanent collection include C.M. Russell, Ace Powell, Hugh Hockaday, Bud Helbig, Olaf C. Seltzer, Jeanne Hamilton, Russell Chatham, John Fery, Leonard Lopp, Frank Hagel and more.

The Crown of the Continent is a permanent exhibition that focuses exclusively on Glacier National Park. The exhibition features photographs, writings, paintings and antique park-related memorabilia. Artists and art in the exhibition rotate periodically, but the overall focus always remains on Glacier National Park.
