= Sherburne Ranger Station Historic District =

United States historic place in Glacier National Park

- U.S. National Register of Historic Places
- U.S. Historic district
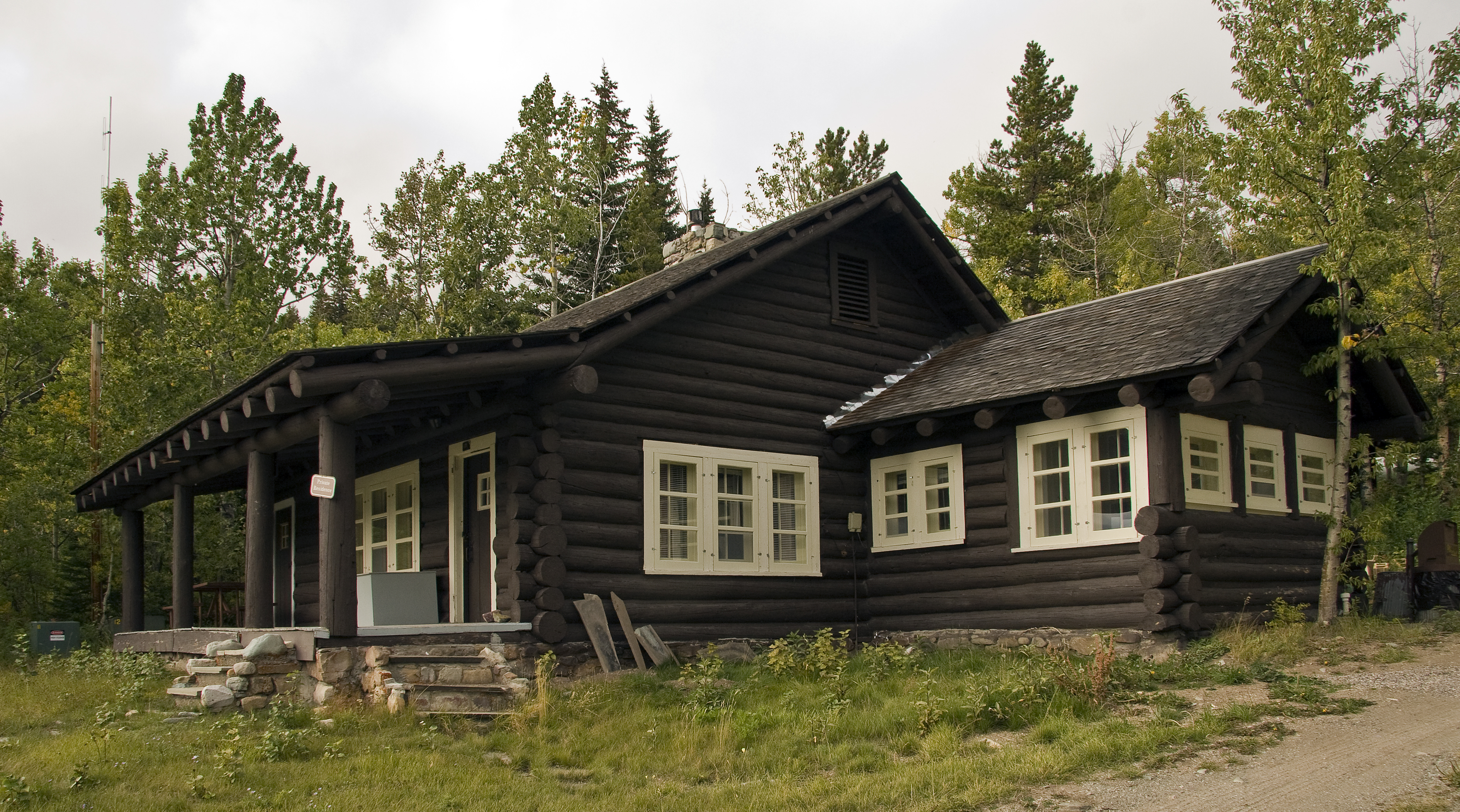

- Location within Montana Location within the United States
- Nearest city: West Glacier, Montana
- Coordinates: 48°49′19″N 113°34′45″W
- Built: 1925
- MPS: Glacier National Park MRA
- NRHP reference No.: 86003698
- Added to NRHP: December 16, 1986

The Sherburne Ranger Station in Glacier National Park is an example of the National Park Service Rustic style. Located in the Swiftcurrent portion of the park, it was built in 1926. It is part of a small historic district that includes a mess hall and subsidiary structures, formerly known as the Sherburne Road Camp, established in 1931. The ranger station closely resembles the ranger stations at Belly River and Lake McDonald. A checking station at the road remains substantially intact.
