= Apgar Fire Lookout =

Historic fire lookout in Glacier National Park, USA

- U.S. National Register of Historic Places
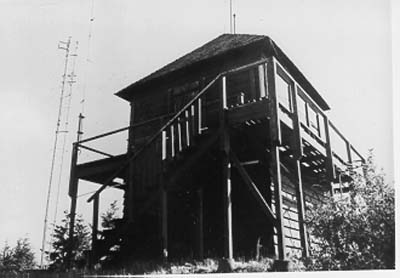

- Location within Montana Location within the United States
- Nearest city: West Glacier, Montana
- Coordinates: 48°31′5″N 114°1′10″W
- Built: 1929
- MPS: Glacier National Park MRA
- NRHP reference No.: 86003695
- Added to NRHP: December 16, 1986

The Apgar Fire Lookout in Glacier National Park is one of a chain of fire lookout posts within the park. The low two-story frame erection with a pyramidal roof was built in 1929. The design originated with the U.S. Forest Service and has been modified and re-used by the Forest Service and the National Park Service in a variety of contexts.

The first lookout at this location was destroyed by fire in 1929, two weeks after its completion. It was immediately replaced with the present structure. The present structure is boarded up and not used.

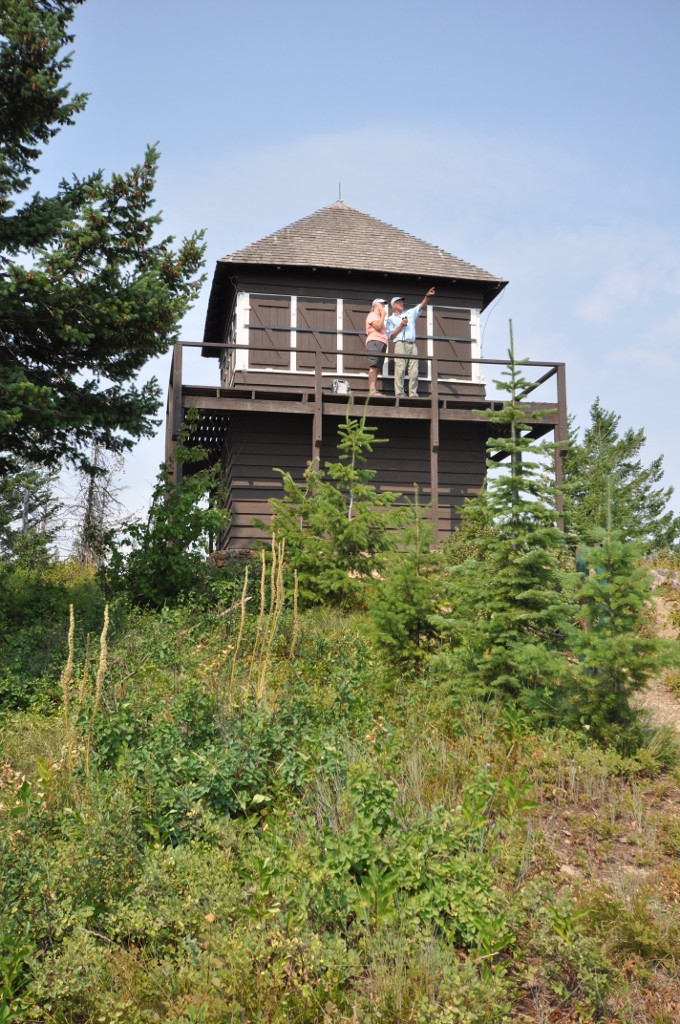
In 2017

Lake McDonald from Apgar Fire Lookout
