= Red Jammers =

Model 706
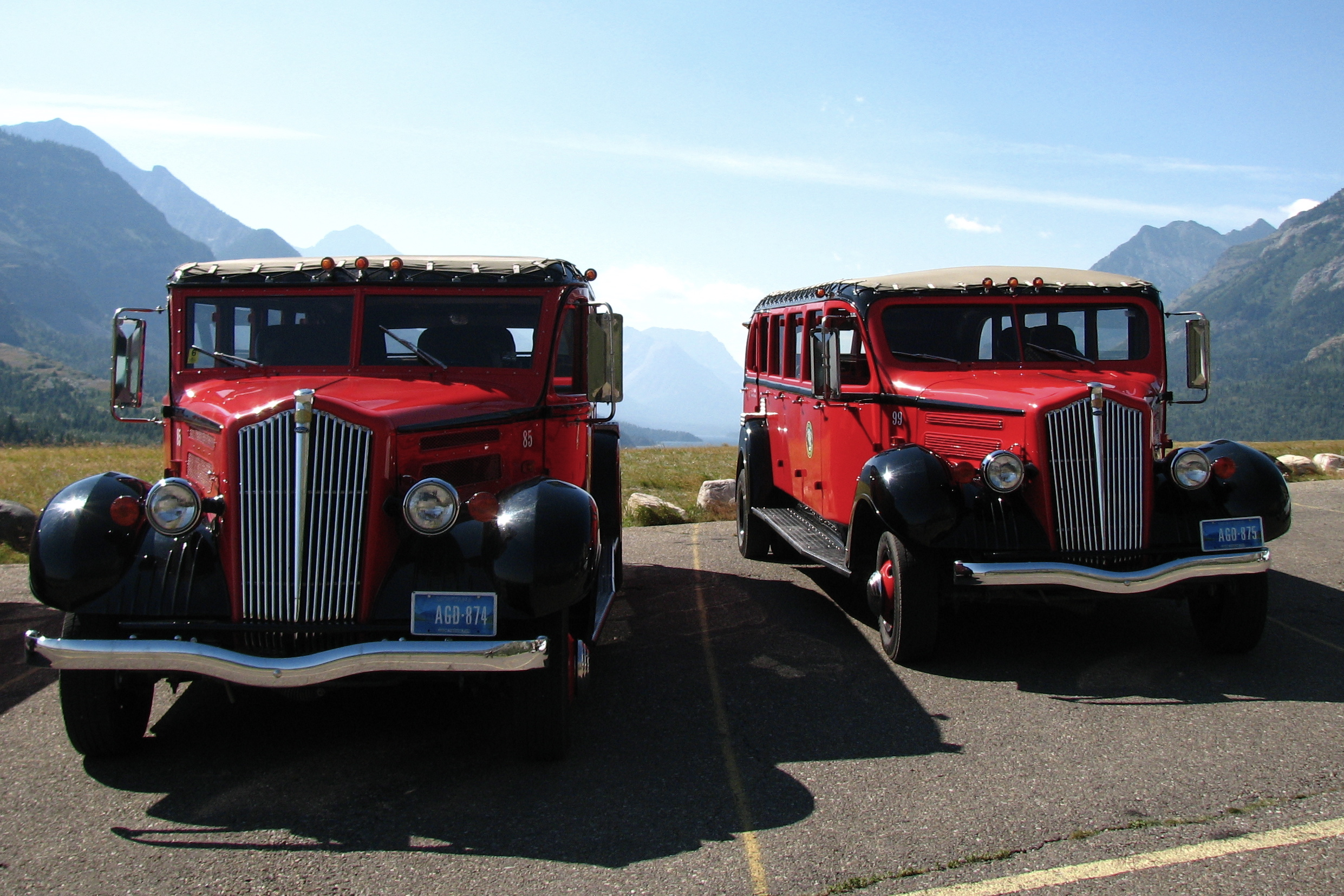
- Red Jammers at the Prince of Wales Hotel (2006)

Overview
- Manufacturer: White Motor Company
- Also called: Whites; Reds; Yellows; Jammers
- Production: 1935–39
- Model years: 1936–39
- Designer: Alexis de Sakhnoffsky; F.W. Black; Frank Bender

Body and chassis
- Layout: FR

Powertrain
- Engine: 5.2 L (318 cu in), I6 White 16A
- Transmission: manual (retrofitted to automatic)

Dimensions
- Wheelbase: 4,470 mm (176 in)

Red Jammers are the vintage White Motor Company/Bender Body Company Model 706 buses used at Glacier National Park in the United States to transport park visitors since 1936. While the buses are called reds for their distinctive livery, painted to match the color of ripe mountain ash berries, the bus drivers are called jammers because of the sound the unsynchronized transmissions made when the driver shifted gears on the steep roads of the park. Even double-clutching could not eliminate all meshing clatter, permanently eliminated in a 1989 retrofit that added automatic transmissions.

== Design ==
The White Motor Company Model 706 chassis with a 94 hp (70 kW) 318 cu in (5.2 L) White 16A flathead inline 6-cylinder engine and body by Bender Body Company outperformed its competition during a group test at Yosemite National Park in California in 1935, leading to that model's selection by the National Park Service. The distinctive vehicles, with roll-back canvas convertible tops, were styled by noted industrial designer Alexis de Sakhnoffsky, with credit for mechanical design to F.W. Black (president of White Motor Co.) and Herman Bender (Bender Body Co.). The White 16A engine and chassis was already being used for intercity and transit service; the canvas top had featured in the earlier White Model 614 buses, first built for Yellowstone since 1931. Some of the later buses built used the White Type 20 engine.

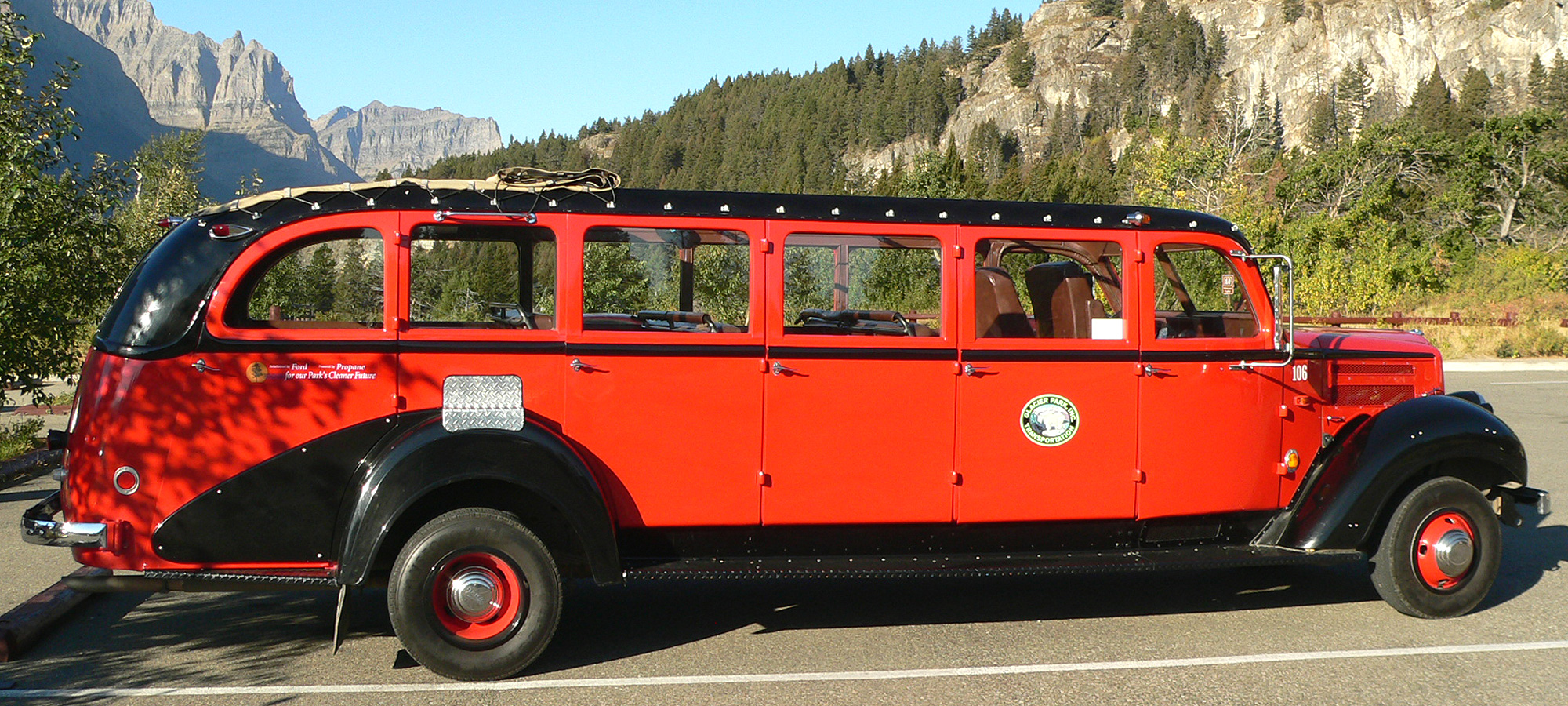
A Red Jammer at Saint Mary Lake, with five curbside doors (2006)

Each of the Red Jammers built for Glacier accommodated seventeen passengers on four four-abreast bench seats (plus one in front, next to the driver), with five doors on the right-hand (curb) side of the vehicle for passengers and one door on the left for the driver; there were four forward and one reverse speeds that required double-clutching to shift between them, with a top speed of approximately 45 mph (72 km/h). The mechanical brakes were prone to overheating and downhill speeds were controlled by engine braking, downshifting to third with a top speed of 22 mph (35 km/h). The White 706 also was available as a fourteen-passenger model, as operated in Yellowstone, omitting the rearmost bench seat in favor of a luggage compartment, distinguishable by the deletion of the rearmost streetside door in favor of a pair of rear gatewing doors, and the presence of metal bars on the rear doors and rearmost side windows and backlight.

The body and trim colors were unique to the park in which they operated.

== History ==
Transportation in Glacier was originally established in 1913 using stagecoaches, but their reliability was poor due to the primitive roads and alpine weather; Walter White floated the idea of using his company's vehicles instead to Louis Hill, who had developed the park's master tourism plan in 1914, and Roe Emery's Glacier Park Transportation Company started an evaluation period that summer with ten 11-passenger buses, five 7-passenger touring cars, and two trucks supplied by White Motor Company. Although the capacity of the buses was overstated and offered primitive protection from the elements, they displaced the stagecoach operation later that summer, and Hill signed an exclusive agreement with White Motor Company to provide buses to Glacier. The original 1914 buses were retrofitted with improved bodies, and new buses were ordered and delivered between 1925 and 1927 after the original buses had aged.

=== White Model 706 ===
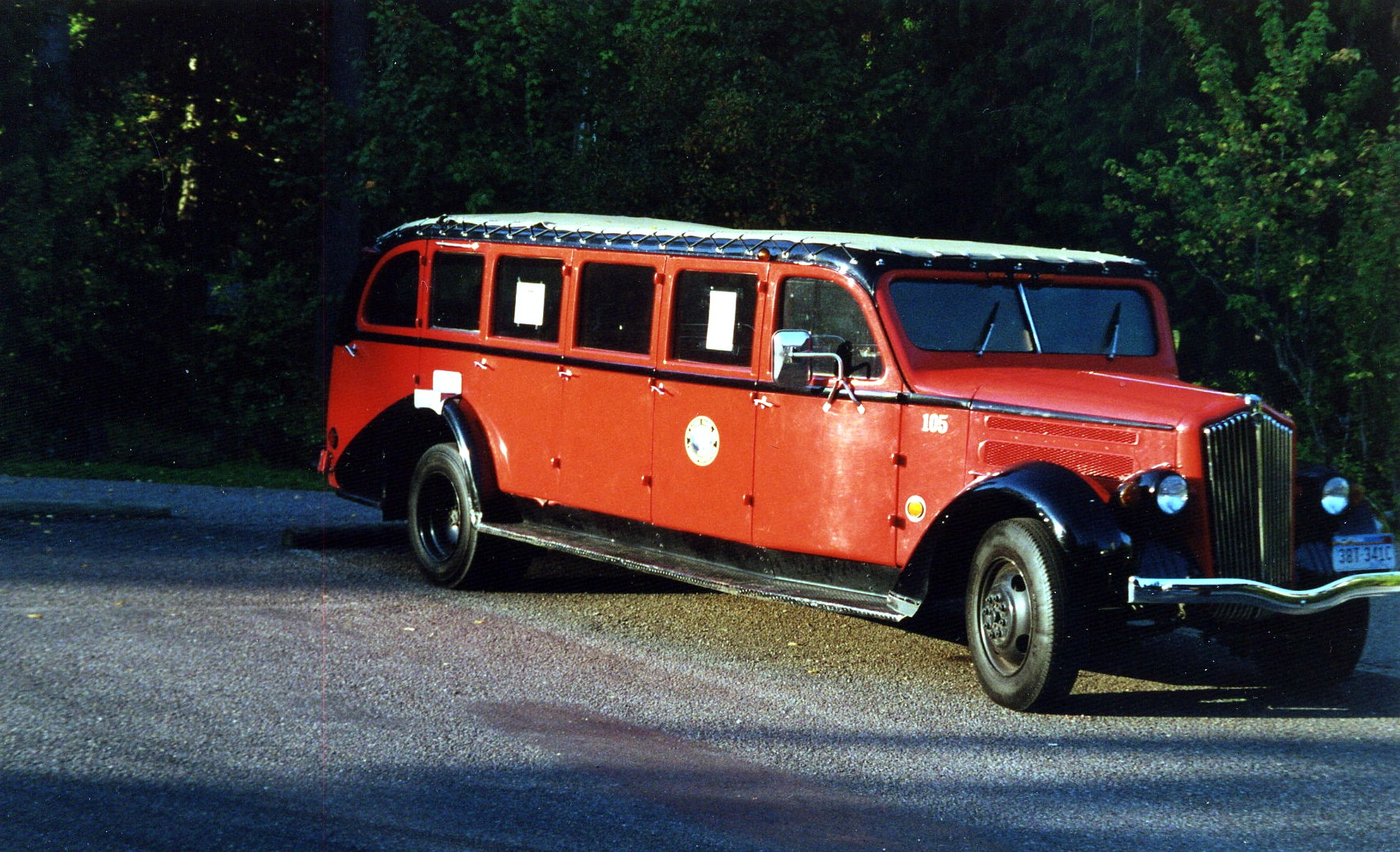
No. 105 prior to restoration (2000), with narrow fenders and large black wheels

The completion of Going-to-the-Sun Road in 1933 forced GPTC to order new buses, as the existing fleet could not traverse Logan Pass. GPTC chose the new White Model 706 along with several other parks; 35 White 706 buses were manufactured for Glacier and delivered between 1936 and 1939, at a cost of US$5,000 (equivalent to $116,000 in 2025) each. Glacier National Park still operated 33 of their original buses as of 2020.

The Volkswagen Type 2 Microbus was considered as a replacement for the Red Jammers in 1956; the Type 2s, which were then in use at Banff National Park, were rejected for lacking air conditioning and having weak engines.

One of Glacier's "missing" buses still survives to this day. The park keeps no. 78 stored in original condition at its headquarters in West Glacier. No. 100 was wrecked beyond repair during a fatal accident that occurred early in the morning of June 27, 1977.

=== 1999–2002 restoration ===
In 1989, the Red Jammers were retrofitted with automatic transmissions, power steering, power brakes, new fuel-injected engines, and new axles. The replacement of the original standard transmissions eliminated the trademark "jamming" sound. However, the well-intentioned modifications in 1989 added stresses to the frame; during the summer 1999 season, one of the Red Jammers lost a front axle after the increased stresses had cracked the front frame members, and closer inspection revealed cracks in many buses, forcing the park's concessionaire to retire the fleet immediately. By that year, it was estimated that each bus had operated for at least 600,000 miles (970,000 km), assuming 100 miles (160 km) of operation each day for 60 years of 100-day seasons. The initial reaction was to make the retirement permanent, but a letter writing and phone campaign convinced the National Park Service to inspect the buses more thoroughly after the 1999 season.

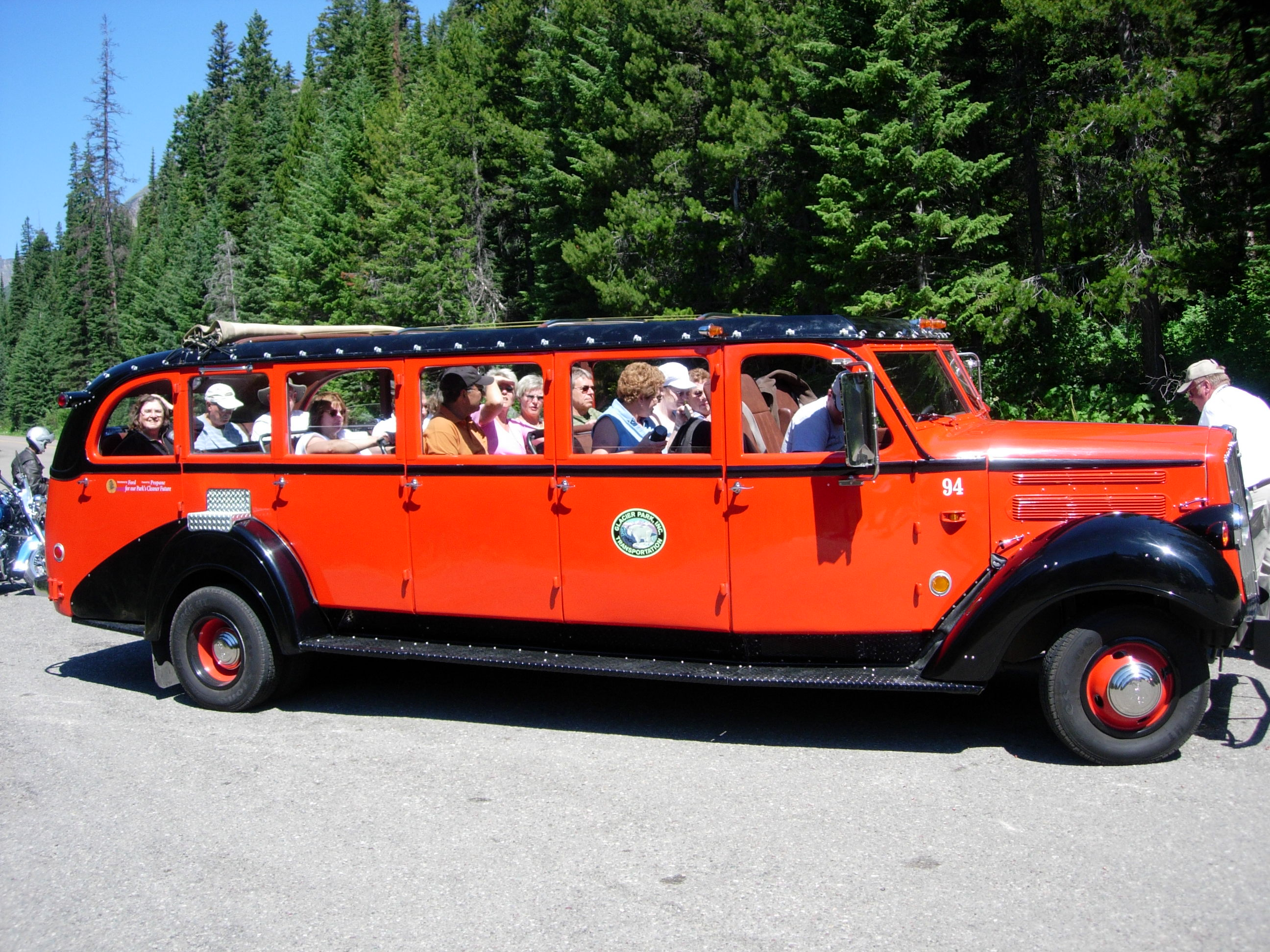
Red Jammer no. 94 full of passengers (2005), showing exterior changes from 2000 to 2002 renovation.\

Bus no. 98 was driven 2,000 miles (3,200 km) to Michigan for inspection by Ford Motor Company in February 2000; Ford, which made a donation of $6.5 million to renovate the fleet, used no. 98 as a renovation prototype, with the cost for the pilot renovation to be shared between Ford and the park's concessionaire. The updated no. 98 debuted at Lake McDonald Lodge on June 21, 2001; a second prototype, no. 105, was rebuilt using a smaller Ford E350 chassis. The cost of restoring no. 98 was US$202,000 (equivalent to $378,000 in 2025), of which Ford paid $177,000; subsequent restoration costs were reduced to US$140,000 (equivalent to $262,000 in 2025) per bus.

Glacier's entire operating fleet was modified between 2000 and 2002 by Ford in conjunction with TransGlobal in Livonia, Michigan, to run on propane or gas to lessen environmental impact. Ford 5.4L V8s were fitted to the chassis. The bodies were removed from their original chassis and fitted to modern Ford E Series van chassis, which were stretched to match the original 176-inch (4,500 mm) wheelbase. The fenders were replaced with fiberglass replicas to accommodate the wider wheels, reduced in diameter from 21 to 16 inches (530 to 410 mm), and numerous detail improvements were made, including replacing the original plywood floors with aluminum, upgrading exterior lights, and fitting safety glass windows.

In late 2018, another renovation was announced for the Red Jammer fleet. The engines installed in the earlier renovation will be replaced by hybrid-assisted 6.2L V8 engines, replacing the 5.4L V8s fitted in 2000–02, and cosmetic details, including new wheels 19.5 inches (500 mm) in diameter and gauges, will more closely resemble the original equipment as delivered in the late 1930s. The modifications will be carried out by Legacy Classic Trucks, based in Driggs, Idaho.

== Other parks ==
Approximately 500 White 706s were manufactured and operated in seven National Parks by 1939: Bryce Canyon, Glacier, Grand Canyon, Mount Rainier, Yellowstone, Yosemite, and Zion. In Glacier, the challenge of driving Going-to-the-Sun road meant a steady demand for bus tours unlike the other parks, where the popularity of private automobiles led to the discontinuance of bus tours, and the other parks sold off their White 706 buses when continued maintenance became too costly in the 1960s.

White 706 bus summaries
| Park | Image | Colors | | Quantity | | | | | Notes |
| Park | Image | Body | Trim | 1936 | 1937 | 1938 | 1939 | Total | Notes |
|---|---|---|---|---|---|---|---|---|---|
| Bryce Canyon | | dark green | silver & black | — | 12 | 1 | 8 | 21 | Silver roof, black trim & fenders. Operated by Utah Parks Company. No known survivors. The 21 noted were shared between the three Utah/Arizona parks. |
| Grand Canyon | | dark green | silver & black | — | 12 | 1 | 8 | 21 | Silver roof, black trim & fenders. Operated by Utah Parks Company. No known survivors. The 21 noted were shared between the three Utah/Arizona parks. |
| Zion | | dark green | silver & black | — | 12 | 1 | 8 | 21 | Silver roof, black trim & fenders. Operated by Utah Parks Company. No known survivors. The 21 noted were shared between the three Utah/Arizona parks. |
| Glacier | | red | black | 19 | 11 | 4 | 1 | 35 | 33 of original 35 still in operation. |
| Mount Rainier | | red? | black? | | | | | | Kenworth supplied five buses of similar configuration to bring tourists from Seattle and Tacoma to Mount Rainier in 1937. |
| Yellowstone | | yellow | black | 27 | 41 | 20 | 10 | 98 | 98 buses originally delivered. 8 updated and returned to operation; most still exist and are owned by private collectors or museums. Unrestored no. 361 is in the Yellowstone Museum collection. |
| Yosemite | | white | ? | | | | | | Yosemite also had a fleet of 10 Pierce-Arrow buses built to the same general configuration. |

=== Yellowstone ===
Restored White 706 buses at Yellowstone
| Orig. No. | New No. | Year built | Skagway name |
|---|---|---|---|
| 372 | 516 | 1936 | Cripple Creek |
| 377 | 510 | 1936 | Yellowstone |
| 404 | 514 | 1937 | Little Rocky |
| 408 | 511 | 1937 | Hollywood |
| 413 | 512 | 1937 | Great Falls |
| 419 | 517 | 1937 | Monty |
| 434 | 513 | 1937 | Big Rocky |
| 450 | 515 | 1938 | Mason City |
ex-Yellowstone buses at Yellowstone (2002), via Skagway, Alaska

Yellowstone National Park, which originally purchased 98 White 706 buses and was that model's largest operator, currently has eight of the original White Model 706 buses available for tours and also keeps one in its original condition. Yellowstone's eight operating buses were repurchased from the Skagway Street Car Company in 2001. Skagway had acquired a small fleet of ex-Yellowstone buses from private collectors starting in 1987. The eight were restored in 2007 by TransGlobal. The restoration mirrored the earlier one performed in 2000–02 by Ford and TransGlobal for the Red Jammers; the bodies were removed and placed on a Ford E-450 chassis with a 5.4L V8 gas engine. In addition, heaters were fitted (as delivered from White, there were no heaters and passengers were given lap blankets to stay warm) and the materials were upgraded.

In at least one instance (for chassis no. 402), the original White inline-6 was replaced by a 300 in^{3} (4.9 L) Ford inline-6; other restorations (Nos. 363, 386, 427) have used original or contemporary White engines.

Other private owners include an operator which restored two tour buses originally built for Yellowstone for tours of Gettysburg National Battlefield. Another ex-Yellowstone White 706 (No. 433) has been used by the Historic Flight Foundation satellite campus in Spokane, Washington since 2012 for special group tours of Felts Field and special occasion transportation. Restored ex-Yellowstone No. 427 is available for rent from American Movie Trucks, after having been auctioned in 2016. Two ex-Yellowstone White 706s were restored in the 1990s by Jack Damratoski; they were eventually sold to conduct tours in the Napa Valley region of California. Another ex-Yellowstone 706 (No. 386) was restored and sold to the Montage Hotel in Big Sky, Montana, where it will shuttle guests after its scheduled 2021 opening.

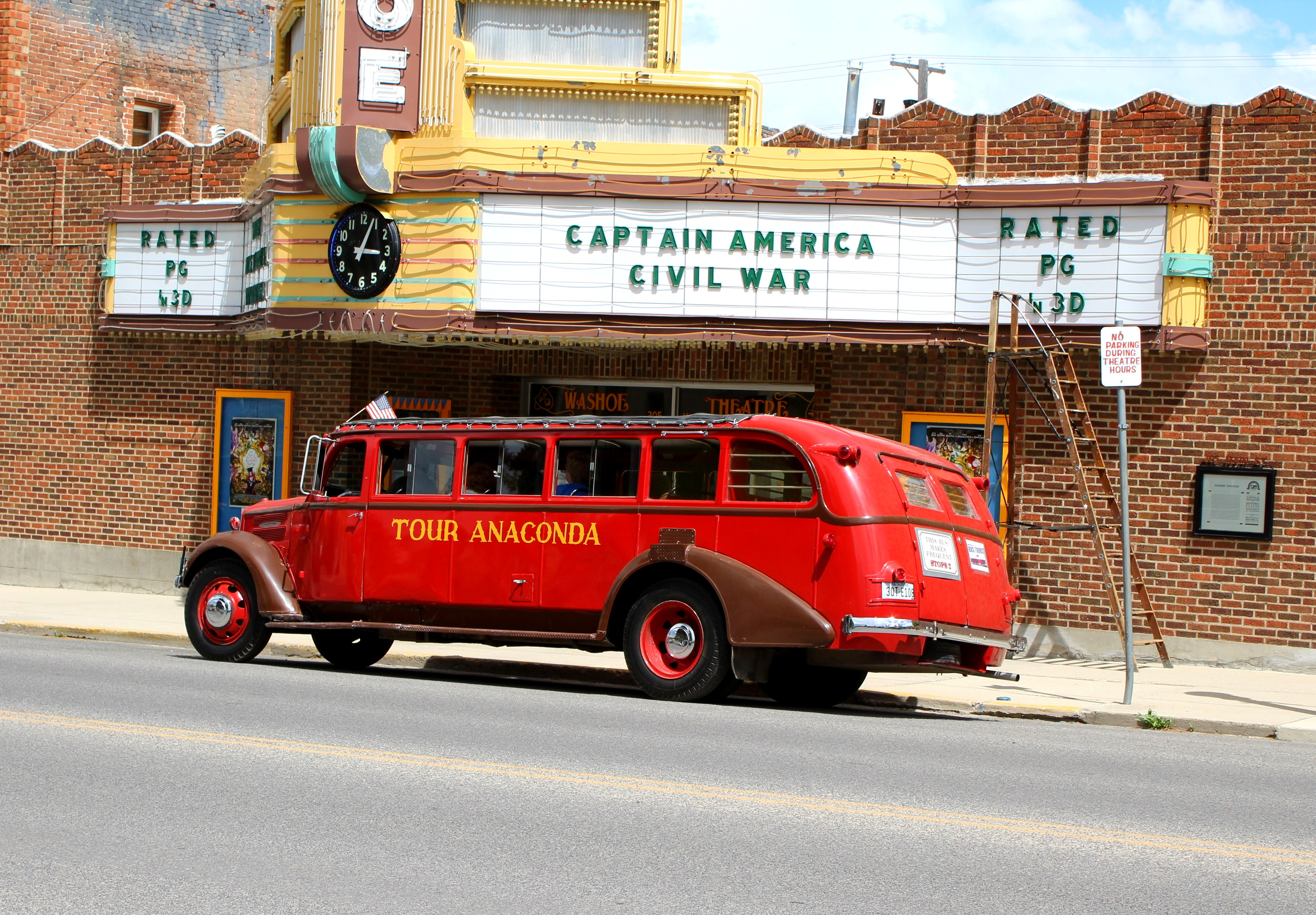
Red Jammer replica (ex-Yellowstone) 1936 White 706 in Anaconda, Montana in 2016

A White 706 which operates in Anaconda, giving tourists a ride around the town, is one of the buses originally built for Yellowstone, repainted in Red Jammer livery, distinguished by the gateswing doors on the rear and the metal bars on the rearmost side windows of the bus's luggage compartment. Access to the rear compartment of the Red Jammers built for Glacier, which is equipped with a bench seat for passengers, is provided through a single streetside door; there is no corresponding rear opening.

=== Utah Parks Co. ===
The Union Pacific Railroad subsidiary Utah Parks Company operated White 706 buses on the Grand Circle loop tour, ferrying passengers from the railroad depot at Cedar City, Utah to Zion, Grand Canyon (North rim), Bryce Canyon, and Cedar Breaks. The buses operated by Utah Parks had a unique dark green, silver, and black livery and lacked the distinctive teardrop-shaped rear fenders of the Glacier and Yellowstone White 706 buses. Like the Red Jammers of Glacier, the Utah Parks buses had five curbside doors, but the rearmost door and compartment were used for luggage, like the Yellowstone buses. Utah Parks acquired 21 of the 18-passenger White 706 buses between 1937 and 1939, which were replaced by larger Crown Supercoaches (A-590-11) starting in 1959.

=== Elsewhere ===
One ex-Mount Rainier White 706 is on display at the Longmire Historic District.
