= Bud Helbig =

American painter, illustrator and sculptor

- Born: Erwin E. Helbig; March 7, 1919; Butte, Montana, U.S.
- Died: February 7, 2002 (aged 82); Kalispell, Montana, U.S.
- Education: Mills Academy; School of the Art Institute of Chicago
- Occupations: Painter, illustrator, sculptor
- Children: 2 sons

Bud Helbig, born Erwin E. Helbig, (March 7, 1919 – February 7, 2002) was an American painter, illustrator and sculptor. His artwork depicted the American West, especially cowboys.

== Early life ==
Helbig was born on March 7, 1919, in Butte, Montana. He grew up in Minnesota, Wisconsin, and Montana's Bitterroot Valley.

Helbig was educated at the Mills Academy in Saint Paul, Minnesota. He graduated from the School of the Art Institute of Chicago.

== Career ==
Helbig began his career as a magazine illustrator in Chicago. He remained in Chicago for two decades until 1969, when he moved to Kalispell, Montana, to become an independent artist. In his paintings, Helbig depicted the American West, especially cowboys. He also designed bronze sculptures.

Helbig joined the Cowboy Artists of America in 1972. His work was added to the permanent collection of the Hockaday Museum of Art in Kalispell.

== Personal life and death ==
Helbig never married and had no offspring. He had one brother, Ric, who was also an artist. He resided in Kalispell, Montana.

Helbig died on February 7, 2002, in Kalispell, at age 82.
