= Belly River Ranger Station Historic District =

United States historic place in Glacier National Park

- U.S. National Register of Historic Places
- U.S. Historic district
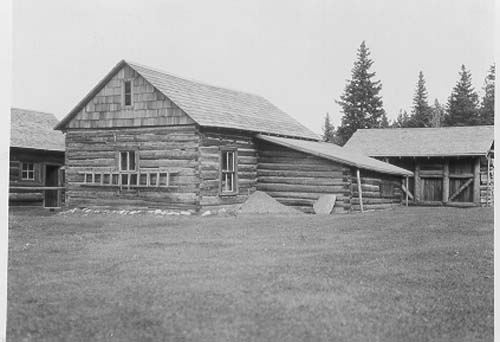

- Location within Montana Location within the United States
- Nearest city: West Glacier, Montana
- Coordinates: 48°55′56″N 113°42′40″W
- Built: 1925
- MPS: Glacier National Park MRA
- NRHP reference No.: 86000329
- Added to NRHP: February 14, 1986

The Belly River Ranger Station Historic District in Glacier National Park includes several historic structures, including the original ranger station, now used as a barn. The rustic log structures were built beginning in 1912. Other buildings include a woodshed, built in 1927 to standard National Park Service plans and a cabin used as a fire cache.

The ranger station building is similar to those at Sherburne and Upper Lake McDonald, with the ranger's office and quarters downstairs and space for guests in the loft. The station is one of the oldest locations, established in 1912 and staffed by District Ranger Joe Cosley. It remains the only ranger station in Glacier which cannot be accessed by road. The present barn was the original 1912 ranger station.

The woodshed is a standard National Park Service design, built according to standard drawing G811. Woodsheds were an essential element of early ranger stations, providing shelter from the snow for work and storage. The fire cache, which is used to house fire-fighting tools, was built in 1928 and used for accommodations for a time, then converted to fire cache use. It is substantially similar to the Kintla Lake fire cache.

There is no utility power at Belly River. Propane is used for heat, cooking and refrigeration.

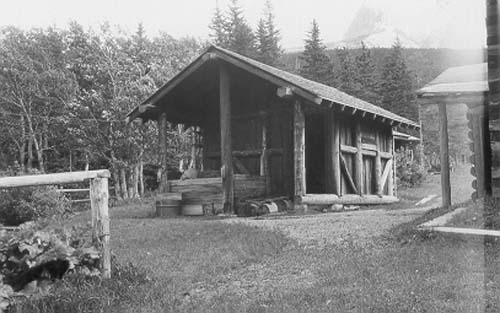
Belly River Ranger Station woodshed

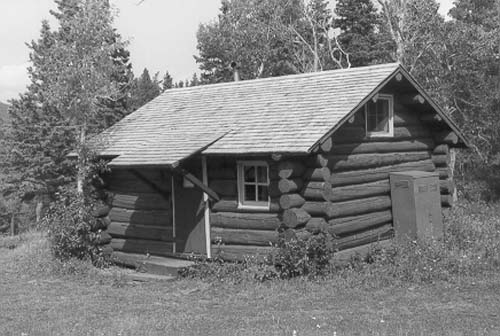
Belly River Ranger Station fire cache
