= Apgar, Montana =

Village in Glacier National Park, United States

Apgar
- Village
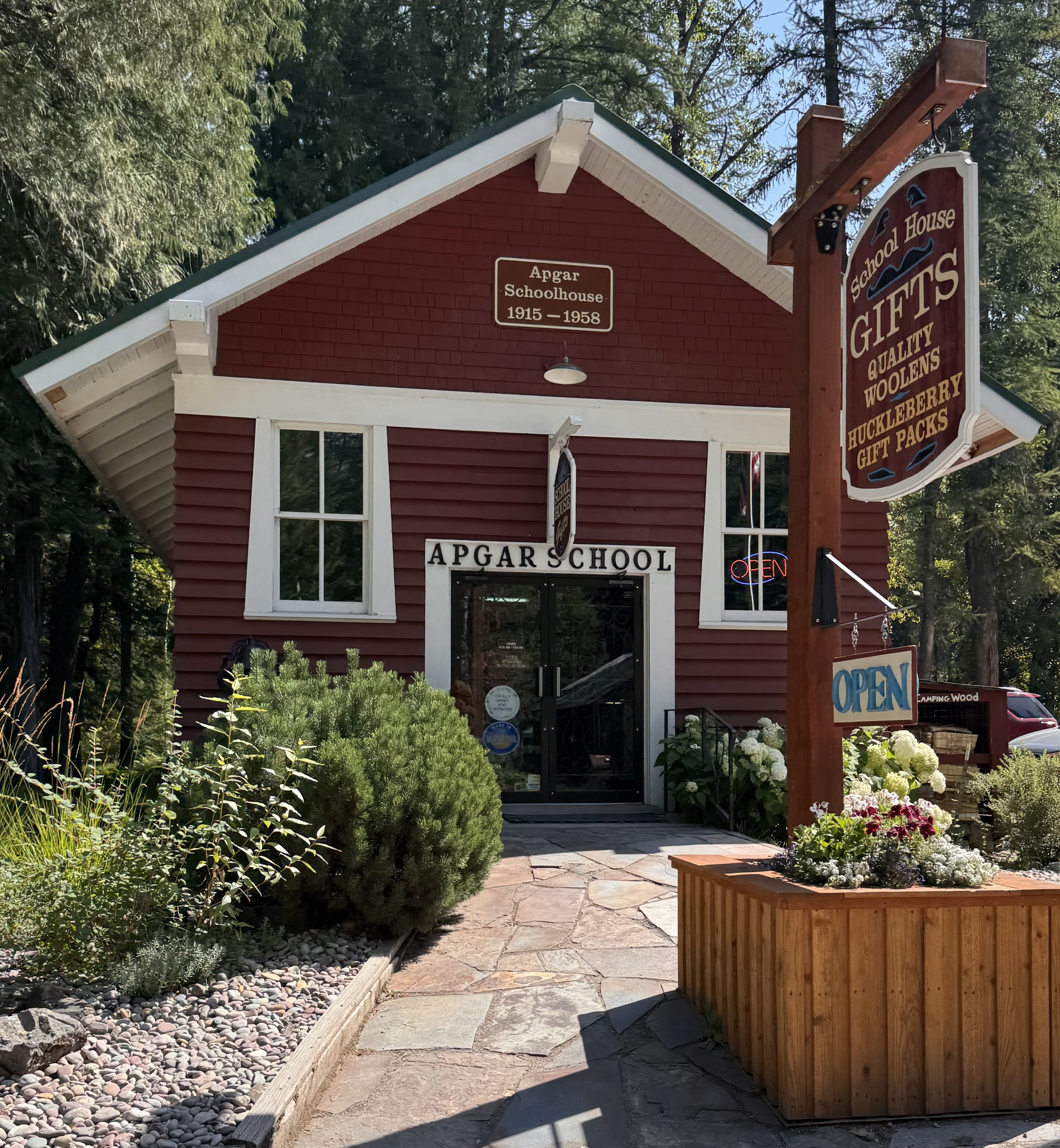
- Apgar historic schoolhouse in 2026
- Interactive map of Apgar
- Coordinates: 48°31′40″N 113°59′35″W
- Country: United States
- State: Montana
- Elevation: 3,166 ft (965 m)
- GNIS feature ID: 779098

Apgar is one of the main villages in Glacier National Park, located at the southern end of Lake McDonald, about one mile from the park's west entrance. Apgar has one of the most popular campgrounds in Glacier National Park. It includes a visitor center, a general store, and a gift shop. It is the starting point for most Red Jammer bus tours on the Going-to-the-Sun Road. Apgar's campground is connected to the village by a road as well as a bike path through the woods, in which smaller wildlife can be seen, though grizzly bears have been spotted close to the camp.

== History ==
The Kootenai knew Apgar as Ya Kit Haqwitnamki ("the place where they dance"), as tribal bands used to meet and perform ceremonies where the current campground is, long before White settlers arrived.

Apgar takes its English name from Milo Apgar, an early settler in the Lake McDonald area. In the 1890s, Apgar, along with Frank Geduhn and Charlie Howe, built homes at the lower end of the lake with the intention of farming the area. This proved impractical, so they and other settlers became involved in servicing tourists visiting the park. As these services increased, the village that grew up around them acquired the name Apgar.

Apgar has two small hotel buildings operated by the same company. It also has its own boat launching ramp and a boat rental dock on its portion of Lake McDonald. Apgar is within a twenty-minute drive from the Lake McDonald Lodge. The summer home of western artist Charles M. Russell, Bull Head Lodge, was formerly located in Apgar. As a young man, artist Ace Powell was also a resident of the village.

== Notable people ==
- Charles M. Russell
- Ace Powell

== See also ==
- List of Glacier National Park (U.S.) related articles
