= California Capital Airshow =

Nonprofit organization

California Capital Airshow (also referred to as Capital Airshow Group, LLC) is a nonprofit organization located in Sacramento, California that organizes year-round events and programs to encourage K-12 students to consider careers in STEM, aviation, and aerospace.

California Capital Airshow is most known for its annual airshow at Sacramento County's Mather Airport. The 2023 event had 105,000 attendees over two days and the event is estimated to have a $7.1 million impact on the Sacramento region's economy.

== California Capital Airshow ==
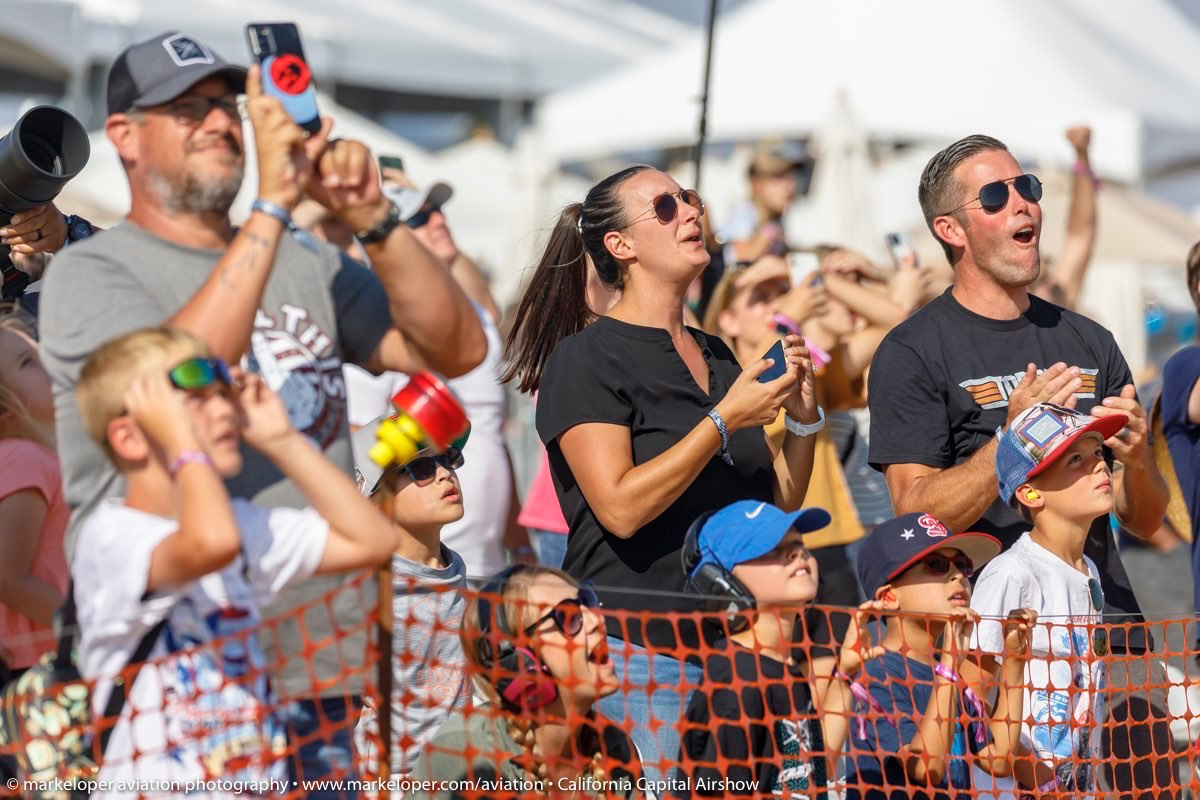
Attendees of the 2023 California Capital Airshow watch the United States Air Force Thunderbirds Jet Demonstration Team.

Founded in 2004, California Capital Airshow is an annual multi-day air show that takes place at Mather Airport. The family-friendly festival offers multiple days of static (non-flying) displays and professionally choreographed and narrated aerial performances. The event features aircraft from the U.S. Air Force, U.S. Army, United States Marine Corps, and U.S. Navy, U.S. Coast Guard, as well as civilian and historic military aircraft.

There are also vendor booths from commercial businesses, recruiting displays from U.S. military and local government agencies. The event also has food vendors and live music.

The event offers various ticketing options with upgraded seating and amenities.

=== Location ===
California Capital Airshow takes place at Mather Airport (MHR), which is located partially in unincorporated Sacramento County and partially in the city of Rancho Cordova. Mather Airport is 12 miles east of Downtown Sacramento, on the south side of U.S. Route 50.

Mather Airport originated as a U.S. Army Air Corp training facility in World War I and was decommissioned as an Air Force base in 1993. It reopened in 1995 as Mather Airport. Sacramento County notes that the airport's runway of 11,301 feet is among the longest and most capable in California.

=== Attendance ===
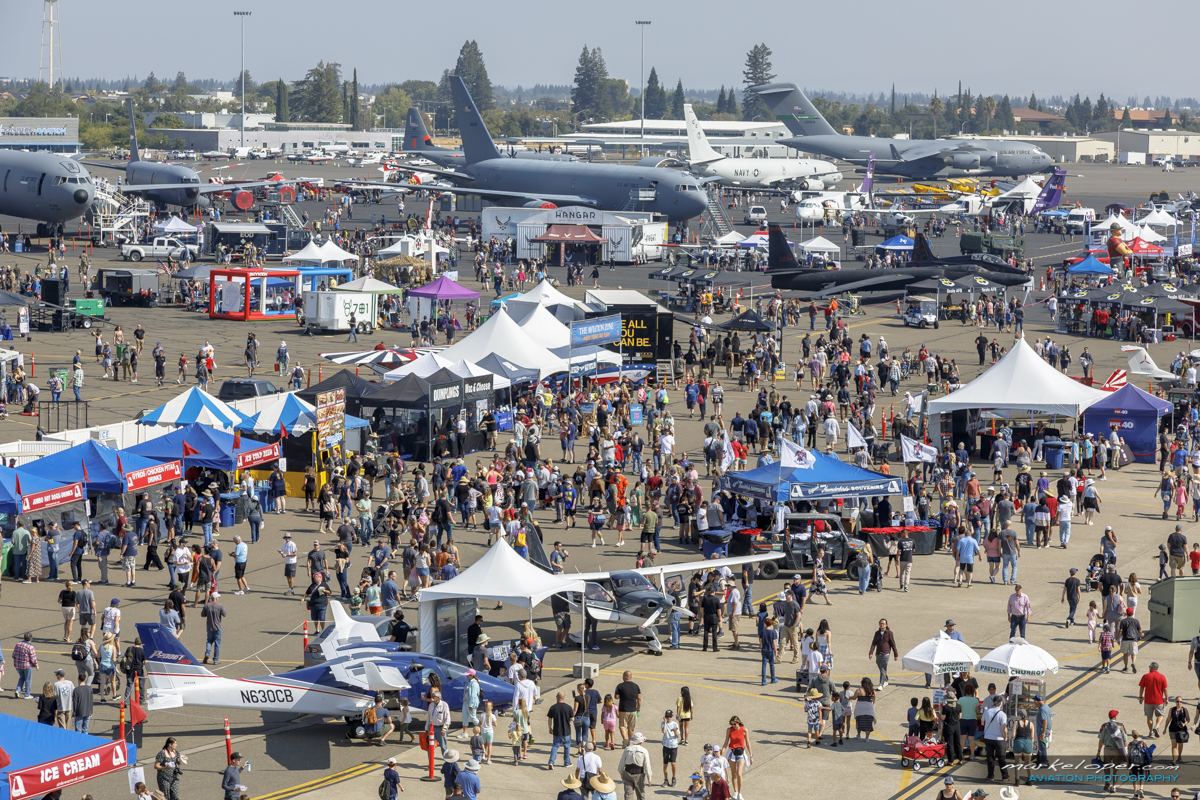
An aerial view of the 2023 California Capital Airshow, at Mather Airport in Sacramento, California.

CCA estimated attendance of 105,000 at its 2023 Airshow. Attendance in 2022 was estimated to be 85,000. The event is All Ages. Children 15 and under attend for free, with an adult.

=== Static Displays and Aerial Performers ===
The show features approximately 100 static (non-flying) civilian and military aircraft. Displayed aircraft include select cargo aircraft from Travis Air Force Base, reconnaissance aircraft from Beale Air Force Base, and historic aircraft including “War Birds,” a Lockheed P-38 Lightning, and a restored Lockheed C-121 Constellation.

Each year's Airshow has a theme, which is supported through featured aircraft and educational exhibits. In 2023, the Airshow's theme was “Cold War Legacy”.

The Airshow features daily performances from civilian and military performers.

==== Past military headliners ====
- A-10 Thunderbolt II
- U.S. Navy Blue Angels
- C-5M Super Galaxy
- C-17 Globemaster
- C-121A
- F-15 Eagle
- F-18 Super Hornet
- F-22 Raptor
- P-38 Lightning
- Patrouille de France
- Royal Canadian Air Force “Snowbirds”
- U-2 Dragon Lady
- U.S. Air Force “Thunderbirds”

==== Past civilian performers ====
- Bill Stein Edge 540
- Boeing B-29 Superfortress
- Curtiss P-40 Warhawk
- Jim Peitz
- Lockheed P-38 Lightning
- North American P-51 Mustang
- Patriots Jet Team
- Republic P-47 Thunderbolt
- Steve Hinton
- Tucker's Air Patrol

==== Annual themes ====
- 2023: 70th Anniversary of Thunderbirds Jet Team & Cold War Legacy Tribute
- 2022: 75th Anniversary of the United States Air Force
- 2021: Introducing The Drive-In Airshow
- 2019: Return of the Blue Angels and Blues & Brews
- 2018: Mather Airport's 100 Years of Service
- 2017: Saluting Bold Stripes, Bright Stars & Brave Hearts
- 2016: Paint the Town Blue & Gold
- 2015: Celebrating Partnerships (US & Canada) & CCA's 10th Anniversary
- 2014: The Raptor Returns
- 2013: 65th Anniversary of The Berlin Airlift
- 2012: Return of the USAF Thunderbirds
- 2011: Tribute to the 75th Anniversary of Pearl Harbor/10th Anniversary of 9/11
- 2010: The Year of the Raptor and the “Lightning Strike”
- 2009: Air Force Week

=== Event volunteers ===
Over 1,000 individuals volunteer for the annual event. Local nonprofit organizations run event concessions and parking, as part of a profit-sharing program.

== History ==
California Capital Airshow was founded in 2004 by the Sacramento County Board of Supervisors and Airport Director, Sacramento County in partnership with the City of Rancho Cordova. It was founded under the parent company Capital Airshow Group, a California nonprofit public benefit corporation that oversees the staging of the California Capital Airshow.

== Economic impact ==
Sacramento County Government reports that the annual economic impact stemming from the Airshow to benefit the Sacramento Region totals $7.1 million.

The event generates an average of 1,300 room nights in the Sacramento region annually and generates $1.60 in economic activity for every $1 in CCA related direct spending.

== Youth programs ==
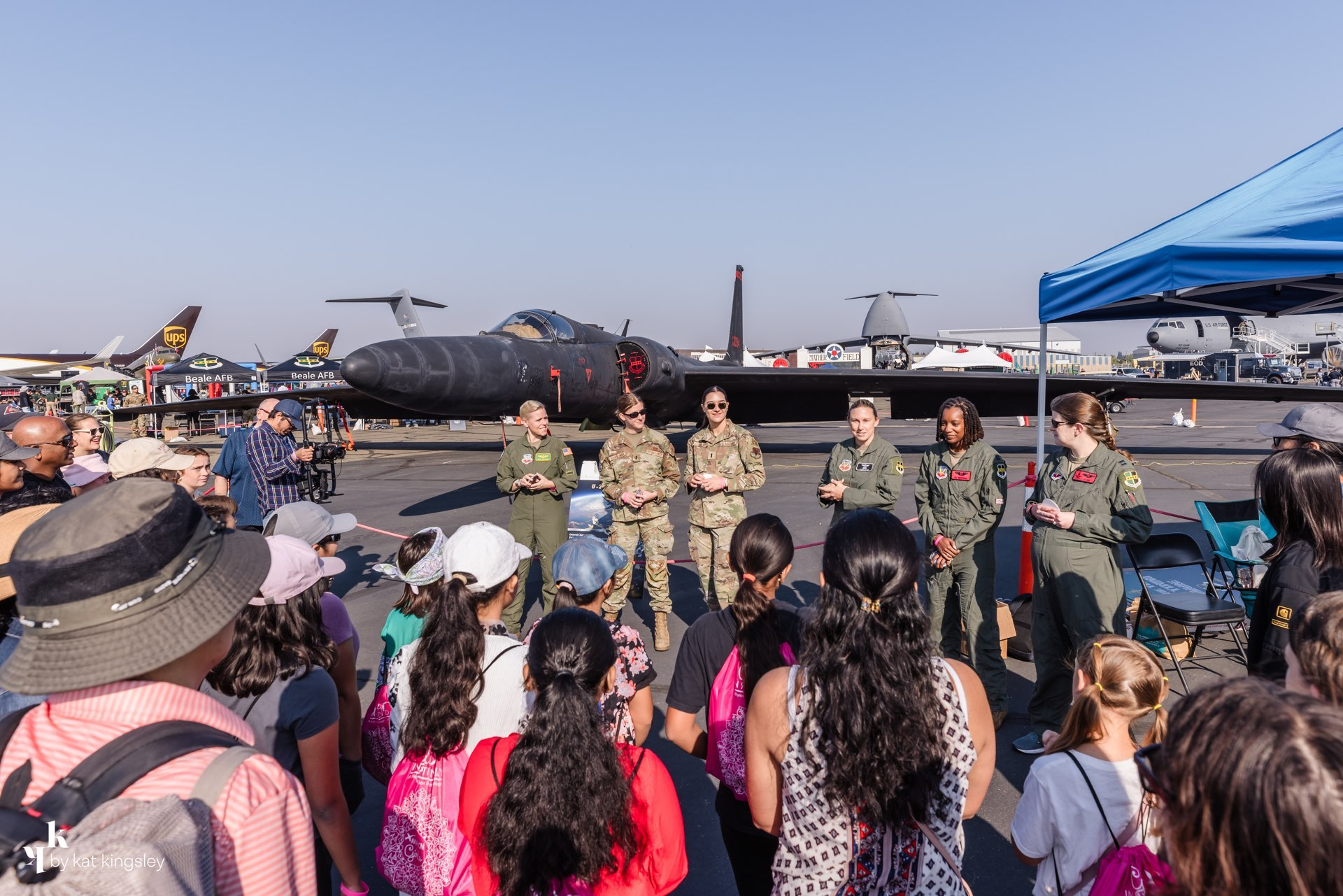
Local Girl Scouts talk to representatives from the United States Air Force about careers in aviation at the California Capital Airshow's 2023 Girls in Aviation Day.

California Capital Airshow organizes several events and programs year-round to encourage K-12 students to consider careers in STEM, aviation, and aerospace. Including:

- Annual STEM Expo - California Capital Airshow invites STEM professionals throughout the U.S. to Mather Airport, to meet with local high school students.
- Girls In Aviation Day - Organized by Women in Aviation International, California Capital Airshow hosts a Girls In Aviation Day event at Mather Airport for the Sacramento region's K-12 female students.
- Annual “Positive Altitude” Expo - K-12 students from the Sacramento region are invited to Mather Airport for hands-on STEM demonstrations and exhibits
- Explore the Drone Zone – Students from throughout the Sacramento region participated in hands-on instruction, activities and demonstrations from leaders in the drone industry.

== Scholarship awards ==
California Capital Airshow awards scholarships to high school seniors interested in pursuing higher education in the STEM, aviation, and aerospace fields. In 2023, CCA awarded 18 scholarships for high school students in Placer, Sacramento, Sutter and Yolo counties, totaling $75,000.
