= Martin Itjen =

- Born: January 24, 1870; Dorum, Germany
- Died: December 3, 1942 (aged 72); Skagway, Alaska

Martin Itjen (January 24, 1870 - December 3, 1942) is most famous for being the unofficial premier tour director of Skagway, Alaska in the early 1900s. He held many distinct titles, including that of miner, railroad employee, hotel operator, hack service, the town's undertaker, Ford motor car dealer, and a tour guide. Much of Skagway's early history was saved from destruction because of his interest in the city.

Itjen was born in Dorum, Germany. He arrived in the United States on February 5, 1891 in Charleston, South Carolina. Relatives say Itjen denied his German citizenship, claiming he was from Austria, possibly to evade the German draft of the era. From Charleston, Itjen went to Jacksonville, Florida and set up shop as a storekeeper. It is assumed by his descendants, that he met his wife, Lucille Petitclare here, as Lucy's death certificate also notes that she had several cousins in Florida.

== Introduction to the Klondike (1898) ==
Itjen came to Skagway, Alaska from Jacksonville, Florida, as a stampeder, in the spring of 1898, at the height of the Klondike gold rush. He later sent for his wife, Lucy, to join him in Skagway. He tried his luck at prospecting. Itjen took up employment working for the White Pass & Yukon Route railroad, while seeking his fortune in gold prospecting. Becoming overly successful at neither, he went into the undertaking business. Between 1915 and 1917 He ran a hack service. It was a wagon that he used as a tour taxi and a coal hauling business.

== The Skagway "Streetcar" ==
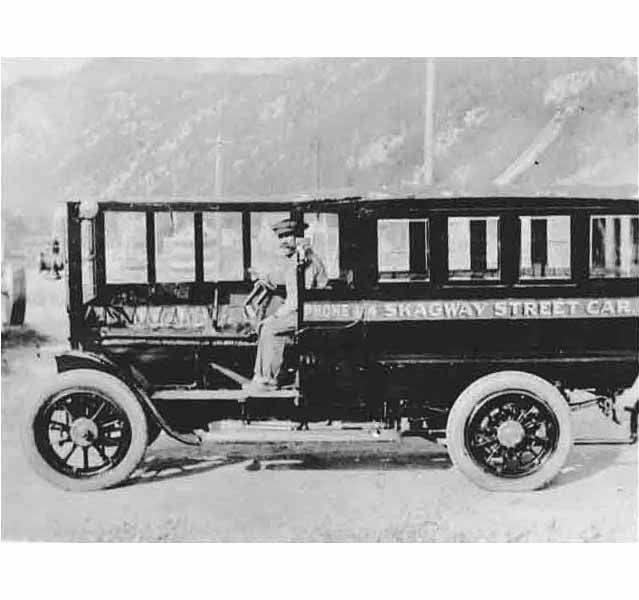

When business was slow he built a tour bus from an old Ford bus. Itjen referred to it as a "streetcar." He began giving tours of the gold rush town. By the 1930s he became Skagway's premier tour agent. The most picturesque car carried a bear cub on the front, the bear growling and pointing to the right or left as the car turned. A small mannequin on the front was operated by foot pedal. He nodded his head, waved a flag, rang a bell, and puffed exhaust smoke through a cigarette. One of the buses had an effigy of Soapy Smith that with the pull of a handle, Itjen would make Soapy salute walking pedestrians as he passed them. The buses toured the streets of Skagway and visited the Gold Rush Cemetery and other Skagway attractions. Itjen's tour was quite a show: He recited poetry, told stories, and related humorous anecdotes of Skagway during the gold rush.

In 1935, as a great publicity stunt, Itjen took his "street car" to Hollywood to promote Skagway tourism. He called on big screen starlet, Mae West, to "come up and visit him sometime." The pair was popular with newsmen and photographers. While in the movie capital, Itjen attracted numerous screen queens to his side for photographs. Skagway had become a tourist stop, thanks to Itjen.

In 1938 Itjen published a book (first edition 1934) and an LP (long playing) record, entitled, The Story of the Tour on the Skagway, Alaska Street Car. Itjen's tours were theatrical productions, complete with motorized mechanical actors, poetry and humorous anecdotes, all relating to the colorful history of Skagway and its inhabitants.

== Soapy Smith Museum ==
Itjen branched out to become the badly needed caretaker of the city's gold rush cemetery. This included badman Soapy Smith's grave, who was at the height of power when Itjen arrived, and was killed in Skagway at the Shootout on Juneau Wharf. A postcard from the era shows Itjen, just outside the graveyard, showing off the world's largest nugget, chained to a tree with a huge chain. In reality, it was just a huge boulder that Itjen had painted gold. In 1935 Itjen purchased and restored Soapy's saloon as part of his streetcar tour. Upon opening the front door to enter, guests were greeted by an effigy of Soapy Smith standing at the bar. With Itjen's mechanical artistry, the front door made Soapy's head turn towards the entering guests, as his hand, complete with beer mug, raised in a toast of welcoming.

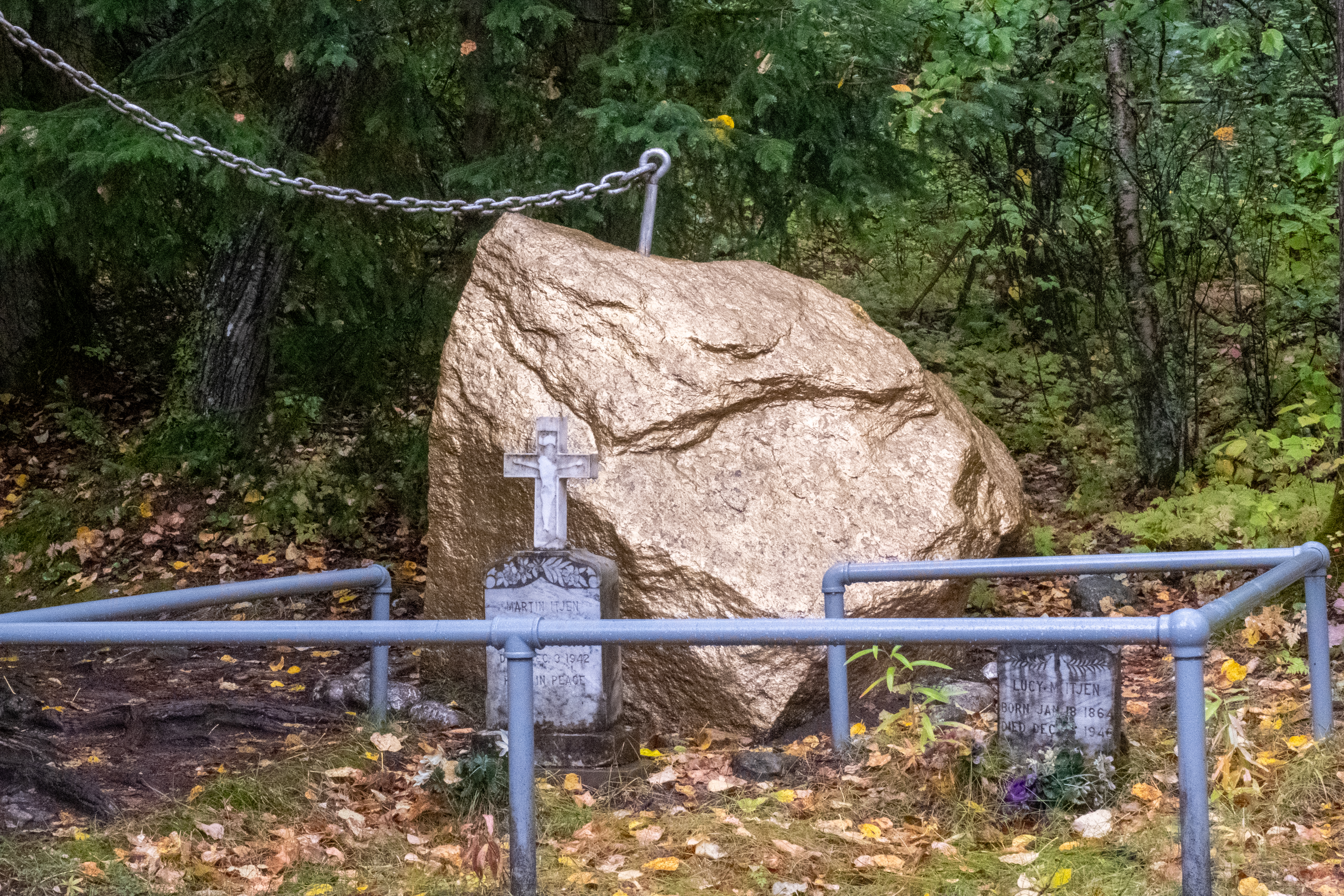
Martin Itjen's grave

Itjen died on December 3, 1942, and his wife Lucy died December 27, 1946. They are buried very near the "world's largest nugget". Their home has been restored by the Klondike Gold Rush National Historical Park, and is used as the museum gift store managed by Alaska Geographic.

== Sources ==
- Bob Wieking, a descendant
