= Joe Cosley =

Joseph Clarence Cosley (1870 – 1943) was a North American ranger and trapper. In 1910, he was one of the first rangers hired by Glacier National Park (U.S.) though he would be subsequently fired in 1911 for illegally poaching and trapping. Cosley regularly carved his names or initials onto the trees in the park, thus adding to his local legend. During his trial for poaching, Cosley escaped and returned to his camp to recover furs he still had there. After escaping into Canada, he sold the furs and lived out the rest of his life trapping in Canada. His body was found in Prince Albert, Saskatchewan after he apparently died of scurvy possibly the year before.

Cosley was born in Ontario in on 25 May 1870. During World War I he became a highly decorated sniper. He died in Saskatchewan in 1943.
