= Kootenai Creek Snowshoe Cabin =

- U.S. National Register of Historic Places
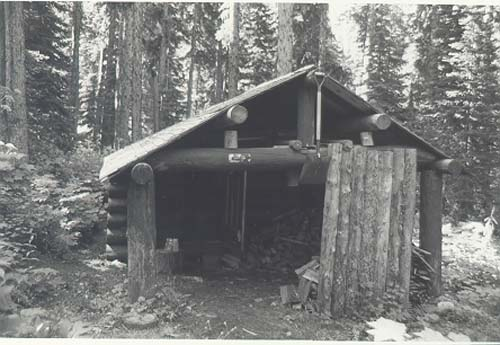

- Location within Montana Location within the United States
- Nearest city: St. Mary, Montana
- Coordinates: 48°51′55″N 113°54′28″W
- Built: 1926
- Architect: National Park Service
- MPS: Glacier National Park MPS
- NRHP reference No.: 99000775
- Added to NRHP: July 1, 1999

The Kootenai Creek Snowshoe Cabin was built in Glacier National Park in 1926. The rustic log structure comprises a single room with a woodstove, and a small cellar food cache. The cabin was situated on the patrol route from the Goat Haunt ranger station to the Fifty Mountain-Flattop region, about eight miles upstream from the ranger station. Unlike most patrol cabins, it is isolated from the park's main trail routes.

== See also ==
- Lee Creek Snowshoe Cabin
