= Upper Lake McDonald Ranger Station Historic District =

Ranger station in Glacier National Park

- U.S. National Register of Historic Places
- U.S. Historic district
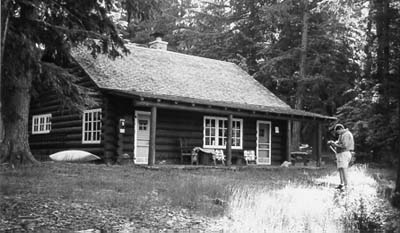

- Location within Montana Location within the United States
- Nearest city: West Glacier, Montana
- Coordinates: 48°38′23″N 113°52′21″W
- Built: 1924
- Architect: Austin Weikert, Asa Powell
- MPS: Glacier National Park MRA
- NRHP reference No.: 86003699
- Added to NRHP: December 16, 1986

The Upper Lake McDonald Ranger Station in Glacier National Park was a formerly isolated site that became an administrative center with the opening of the Going-to-the-Sun Road. The National Park Service Rustic cabin was typical of the preferred style for western park structures of the period. The ranger station is similar to its counterparts at Belly River and Sherburne, as well as the Polebridge Ranger Station residence.

The district includes the ranger station, a woodshed, boathouse, garage, cabin, fire cache and a pumphouse.

The boathouse burned in the Howe Ridge Fire of 2018 and only the foundation remains. The ranger station itself and other buildings were saved.
