= Lake McDonald =

Lake in Flathead County, Montana, United States

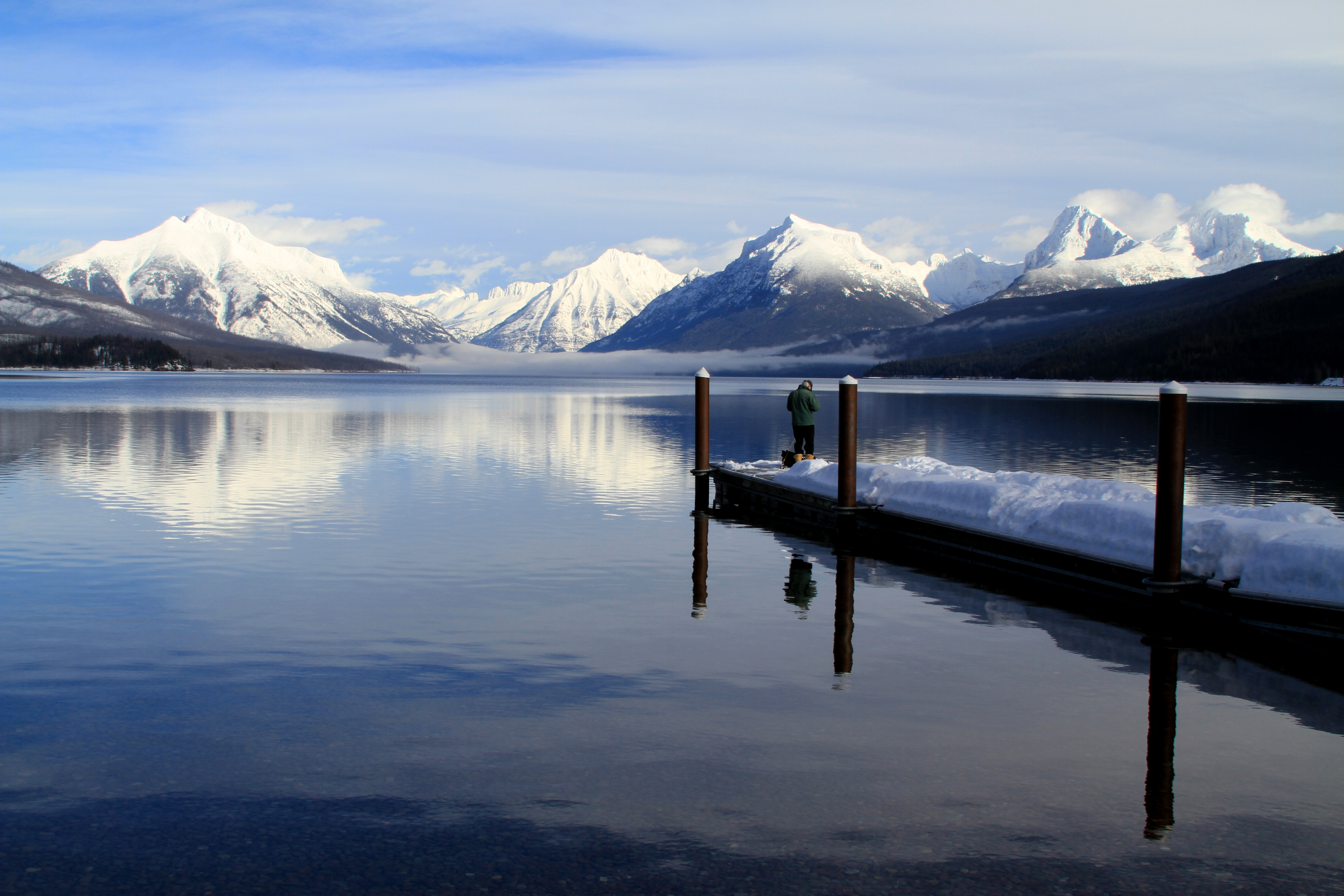
- Lake McDonald in the winter View from Apgar Fire Lookout

- Location within Montana Location within the United States
- Location: Glacier National Park, Flathead County, Montana, US
- Coordinates: 48°34′09″N 113°56′07″W
- Type: Natural lake
- Primary inflows: Various streams
- Primary outflows: McDonald Creek
- Basin countries: United States
- Max. length: 10 mi (16 km)
- Max. width: 1 mi (1.6 km)
- Surface area: 6,823 acres (2,761 ha)
- Max. depth: 472 ft (144 m)
- Surface elevation: 3,153 ft (961 m)

Lake McDonalds is the largest lake in Glacier National Park. It is located in Flathead County in the U.S. state of Montana. Lake McDonald is approximately 10 miles (16 km) long, and over a mile (1.6 km) wide and 472 feet (130 m) deep, filling a valley formed by a combination of erosion and glacial activity. Lake McDonald lies at an elevation of 3,153 feet (961 m) and is on the west side of the Continental Divide. Going-to-the-Sun Road parallels the lake along its southern shoreline. The surface area of the lake is 6,823 acres (27.6 km^{2}).

The lake is home to numerous native species of trout, and other game fish. Catchable species include: westslope cutthroat trout, rainbow trout, bull trout (char), lake trout (char), Lake Superior whitefish, mountain whitefish, kokanee salmon (landlocked sockeye), and suckers. The lake is nutrient-poor and is not considered a prime fishing destination. Grizzly bears, black bear, moose, and mule deer are found in many places near the lake but are most common on the north shore. The lake is surrounded by a dense coniferous forest dominated by various species of spruce, fir, and larch.

Aerial view. Lake McDonald in the left bottom.

Lake McDonald was referred to by the Kootenai as the lake by Ya Kit Haqwitnamki ("The Place Where They Dance"), which was their name for the current campsite at Apgar, where they used to meet and perform various ceremonies. The lake was named after Duncan McDonald, a Hudson's Bay Company trader who worked in the Flathead Valley area and carved his name on a tree near the lake in 1878.

At the westernmost section of the lake in Apgar there is a National Park Service visitor center with wi-fi access, restrooms and a gift shop. Lake McDonald Lodge is the largest lodging facility on the lake and is approximately 5 miles (8.0 km) east along the Going-to-the-Sun Road. The lodge was constructed in 1913–14 to resemble a rustic hunting lodge with Swiss-influenced architecture.

McDonald Creek flows into and drains from the lake, and empties into the Middle Fork Flathead River shortly after.

The view from about halfway across the lake.
