= Louis Hill =

Louis Hill may refer to:

- Louis A. Hill (1865–1933), official in the United States Department of the Treasury
- Louis G. Hill (1924–2013), member of the Pennsylvania State Senate
- Louis W. Hill (1872–1948), American railroad executive
- Louis Warren Hill Jr. (1902-1995), American businessman and politician
- Lou Hill (born 1944), Dutch-born Australian politician

== See also ==
- Lewis Hill (disambiguation)
