= North Oaks Golf Club =

Golf course in North Oaks, Minnesota

Coordinates: 45°5′4″N 93°5′41″W

- Interactive map of North Oaks Golf Club

Club information
- Location: North Oaks, Minnesota
- Established: 1950
- Type: Private
- Total holes: 18
- Tournaments: MN Section PGA Championship in 1954 and 2000
- Website: northoaksgolfclub.com
- Designed by: Stanley Thompson - Redesigned by Tom Lehman
- Par: 71
- Length: 6,700 yards (6,100 m)

North Oaks Golf Club (NOGC) is located in North Oaks, Minnesota, United States. The championship golf course was originally designed by golf course architect Stanley Thompson in 1950. The course is located just inside the private community of North Oaks. It has hosted numerous MGA Championships and a few MN section PGA Championships in 1954 and 2000.

== History ==
In 1883 James J. Hill, known as "The Empire Builder," purchased a 3,070-acre piece of land from Charles D. Gilfillan and named it the North Oaks Farm. When Hill died, his son Louis W. Hill inherited much of the land. Stanley Thompson began work on designing a golf course in 1950 after more land was bought, and it officially opened in the summer 1951. Shortly before it had opened, a storm caused two holes to be flooded. North Oaks Golf Club became an official private golf club in 1953. The term and process called a shotgun start was first used at North Oaks Golf Club, although it was incorrectly credited three years later to a course in Washington. Lehman Design Group renovated the course in 2007, fixing particular issues while mostly sticking to Thompson's original design.

North Oaks Golf Club maintains a caddy program where young persons can work towards obtaining a scholarship through the Evans Scholars Foundation.
