= Erica Anderson =

American film director, writer and cinematographer (1914–1976)

- Born: Erika Kellner; August 8, 1914; Vienna, Austria
- Died: September 23, 1976 (aged 62); Great Barrington, Massachusetts, U.S.
- Occupations: Cinematographer, film director, writer
- Notable work: Albert Schweitzer

Erica Anderson (1914–1976) was an American film director, writer, and cinematographer. She was among the first women working as a professional cameraperson in documentary and industrial films and filmed documentaries of Albert Schweitzer, Grandma Moses, and Henry Moore. Two documentary films on which she served a cinematographer received Academy Award nominations for Best Short Subject (Two-Reel) in 1951, Grandma Moses, and Best Documentary Feature in 1958, which it won, Albert Schweitzer.

== Early life and education ==
Erika Kellner was born in Vienna, Austria, on August 8, 1914, to Eduard and Ilona Rosenberg Kellner. While in Vienna, she worked in the studio of Georg Fayer. She was forced to immigrate in 1938, and went to London where she worked in art galleries. She married William Adrian Collier Anderson, a British physician, in 1939, though they divorced in a few years. She moved to the United States in 1940, following her parents and sister. She studied with the New York school of photography and opened a studio in New York at 11 West 69th Street. She ran the studio until 1965.

== Career ==
Anderson was initially a still photographer, which she practiced in Vienna and New York. According to one scholar, she may have been the first woman to work professionally as a filmmaker and camerawoman in the United States. Between 1940 and 1947, Anderson worked in a variety of roles such as researcher, writer, editor, camera operator, and director for United Specialists, Inc., Hartley Films, Creative Images, and others. Some of the films she made during this time included commissions for the Girl Scouts of America, General Dwight Eisenhower's visit to New York, the Duke of Windsor's stay in Washington, DC, and a travelogue of Pennsylvania for the Standard Oil Company.

From 1947 to 1950, she was a director employed at Falcon Films (along with Jerome Hill). Two of the films made during this time, Henry Moore and French Tapestries Visit America might have been among the first 16mm color films shot in the US.

Collaborating with artist/filmmaker Jerome Hill, she provided the cinematography for two Academy Award-nominated biographical documentary films. The first, a short about the octogenarian painter Grandma Moses, began, according to Hill, when he saw uncut material she had shot of Moses. As Hill describes it, "Erica had a fine eye for detail, a flair for the whimsical, and a highly developed sense of the drama." To shoot Albert Schweitzer, Anderson spent the winters of 1952-1954 in Lambaréné at the hospital with the famous doctor and humanitarian. the film took five years to complete and won the 1958 Academy Award for Best Documentary Feature.

No Man is a Stranger, a 29-minute color film documenting the history and treatment of mental disorders in Haiti that Anderson shot and directed, was made available to professional groups by Schering Corporation and in cooperation with the Department of Mental Hygiene of the State of New York and the Republic of Haiti.

Anderson purchased a property in Great Barrington, Massachusetts, in 1966 and founded the Albert Schweitzer Friendship House as a memorial to Schweitzer, who had died in 1965. Anderson died of a heart attack on September 23, 1976, at her Great Barrington home. The Syracuse University Libraries holds the Erica Anderson Collection, which includes documents from the Albert Schweitzer Friendship House.

== Filmography ==
- They Need Not Die (for the American Red Cross)
- The Capitol (for the Coordinator of Inter-American Affairs)
- Animals in the Service of Man (for the American Humane Society)
- Henry Moore (1947)
- French Tapestries Visit America (1948)
- Grandma Moses (1950), photography by
- A short on the Salzburg Seminar (195?)
- A Village is Waiting, filmed and directed by, for Unitarian Service Committee
- Albert Schweitzer (1957), photography by
- No Man is a Stranger (1958), photographed and directed by
- The Living Work of Albert Schweitzer (1965)
- Albert Schweitzer; the Power of His Life (1974), photography by
- For All That Lives: The Words of Albert Schweitzer (1974), photography by

== Publications ==
- The World of Albert Schweitzer. NY: Harper and Brothers, 1955.
- The Schweitzer Album. NY: Harper & Row, 1965.
