= Mota, Ljutomer =

Mota
- Location in Slovenia
- Coordinates: 46°32′46.46″N 16°13′35.51″E
- Country: Slovenia
- Traditional region: Styria
- Statistical region: Mura
- Municipality: Ljutomer

Area
  - Total: 5.75 km^{2} (2.22 sq mi)
- Elevation: 175 m (574 ft)

Population (2002)
  - Total: 334

Mota (pronounced [ˈmoːta], German: Mauthdorf) is a settlement on the right bank of the Mura River in the Municipality of Ljutomer in northeastern Slovenia. The area is part of the traditional region of Styria and is now included in the Mura Statistical Region.

The local chapel-shrine in the centre of the village was built in 1861 and restored in 1987.

== Notable people ==
Notable people that were born or lived in Mota include the following:

- Francis Missia (1885–1955), Catholic priest and choirmaster
- Jakob Missia (1838–1902), Archbishop of Gorizia and Gradisca, Bishop of Ljubljana
