= Northland Lodge =

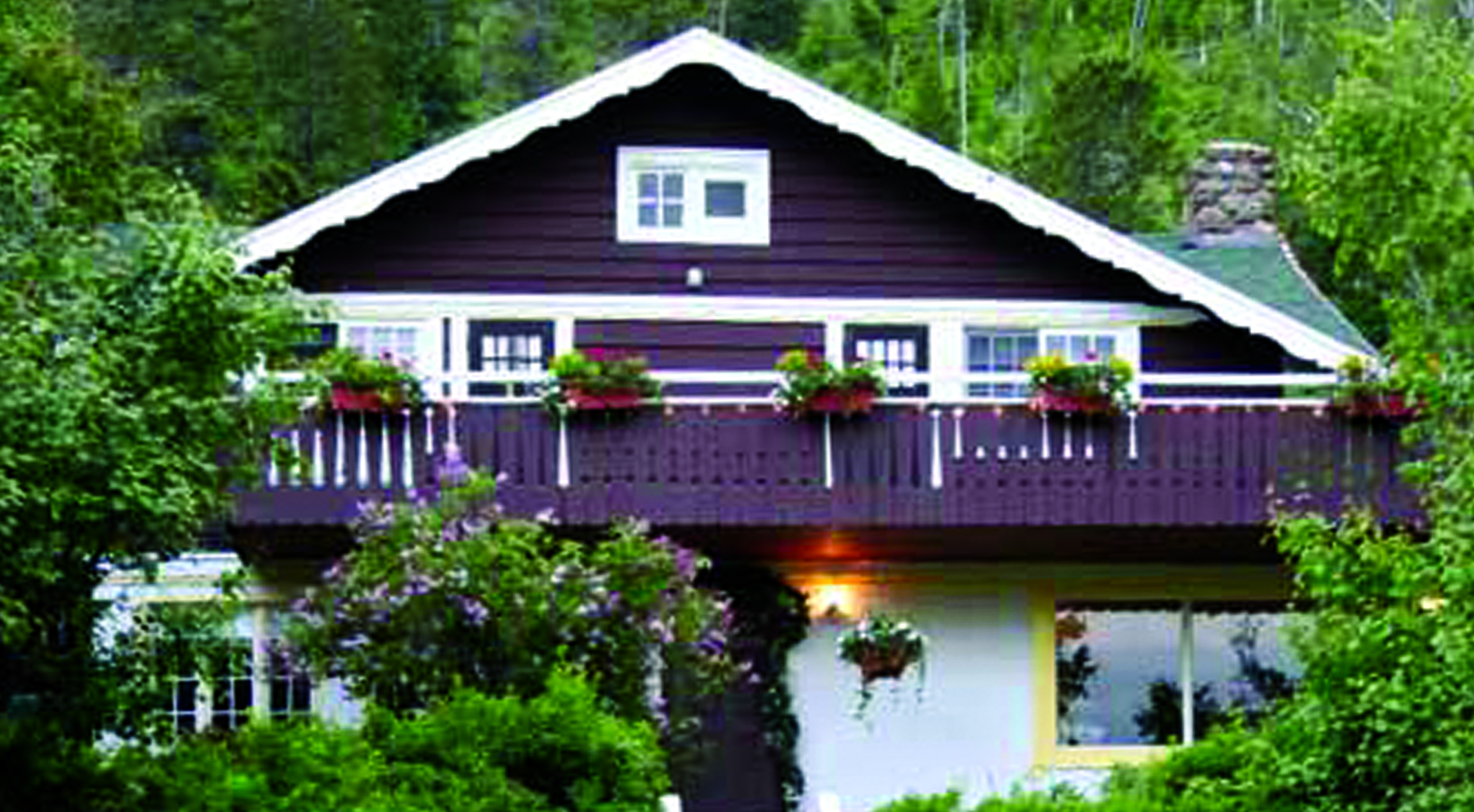
- North face of the lodge (2006)

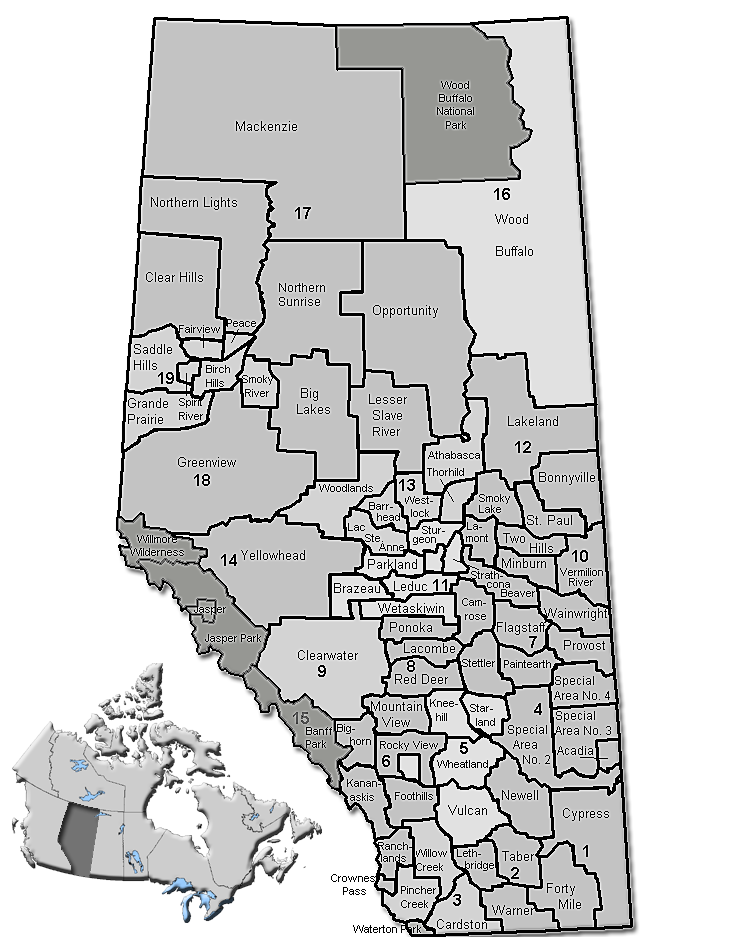
- Location of Waterton Lakes National Park in Alberta
- Former names: Carthew Lodge

General information
- Location: Waterton, Alberta, Canada, 408 Evergreen Ave. Waterton; Alberta; T0K TM0
- Coordinates: 49.0501°N 113.9165°W
- Completed: August 29, 1928
- Opening: 1948

Technical details
- Floor count: 2

Design and construction
- Architect: Louis W. Hill

Other information
- Number of rooms: 9
- Parking: Limited

Northland Lodge is a guesthouse located in the lakeside town of Waterton, Canada within Waterton Lakes National Park and Improvement District No. 4 of the province of Alberta.

== Description ==
The building consists of nine rooms and has functioned as a summer inn for guests visiting Waterton-Glacier International Peace Park since 1948. It sits along the western edge of town near Cameron falls.

== History ==
Louis W. Hill of Great Northern Railway commissioned Doug Oland, one of the principle builders of the Prince of Wales Hotel to construct the building in June 1928. Hill made extensive alterations to the original building design before the foundation was laid on June 15. The first plans for the house consisted of only a single story, but Hill requested the inclusion of a second story with balconies under a four gable roof. In all, the second story included four bedrooms with three washbasins and a shared toilet and bath. The house was completed on August 29, 1928. Neither Hill nor his family ever officially occupied the commissioned Carthew Lodge despite saying he was "greatly pleased with what he saw," possibly because of time spent at his three other rural residencies across the U.S. It is possible he used the construction of the superfluous home in order to keep Oland in Waterton in case additional expansions and repairs were needed on the Prince of Wales. The death of Hill in 1948 resulted in the sale of the lightly used estate to new owners Hugh Black and Earl and Bessie Hacking who renamed it Northland Lodge and utilized the building primarily as a hotel. The lodge continues to be managed by members of the Hacking family.

== Gallery ==
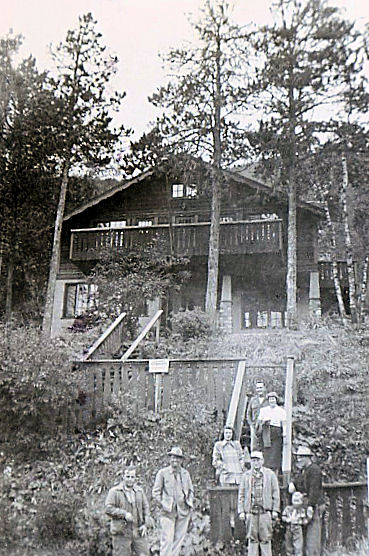
North face of the lodge (1948)

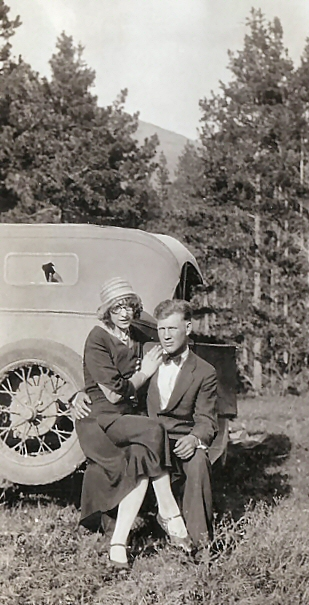
Bessie and Earl Hacking (circa 1920)
