= Lewis Hill =

Lewis Hill may refer to:

- Lewis Hill (Antarctica), a hill on James Ross Island, Antarctica
- Lewis Hill (radio company founder) (1919–1957), co-founder of Pacifica Radio
- Lewis Hill (cricketer, born 1990), English cricketer
- Lewis Hill (cricketer, born 1860) (1860–1940), English cricketer
- Lew Hill (basketball) (1964/65–2021), American basketball coach

== See also ==
- Louis Hill (disambiguation)
