= North Oaks Farm =

- James J. Hill's North Oaks Farm, Dairy Building
- U.S. National Register of Historic Places
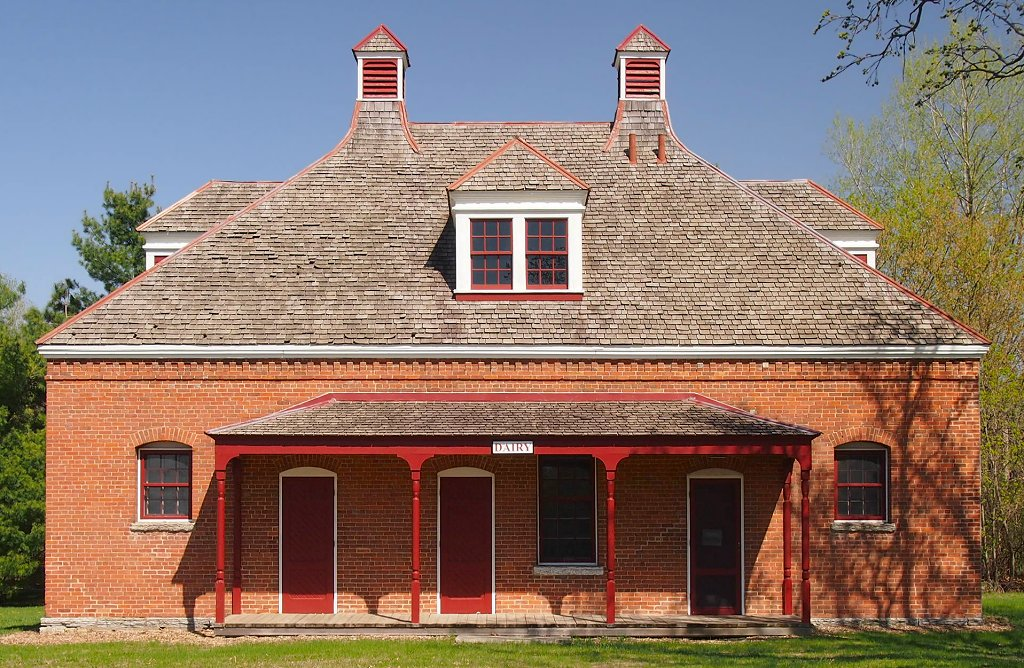
- The Dairy Building from the west

- Location within Minnesota Location within the United States
- Location: Red Barn Road and Hill Farm Circle; North Oaks, Minnesota
- Coordinates: 45°5′33″N 93°6′30″W
- Built: 1884
- Architectural style: Colonial Revival
- NRHP reference No.: 97000441
- Added to NRHP: May 16, 1997

- James J. Hill's North Oaks Farm Dairy Building, Granary Root Cellar and Auxiliary Buildings, Boundary Increase
- U.S. National Register of Historic Places
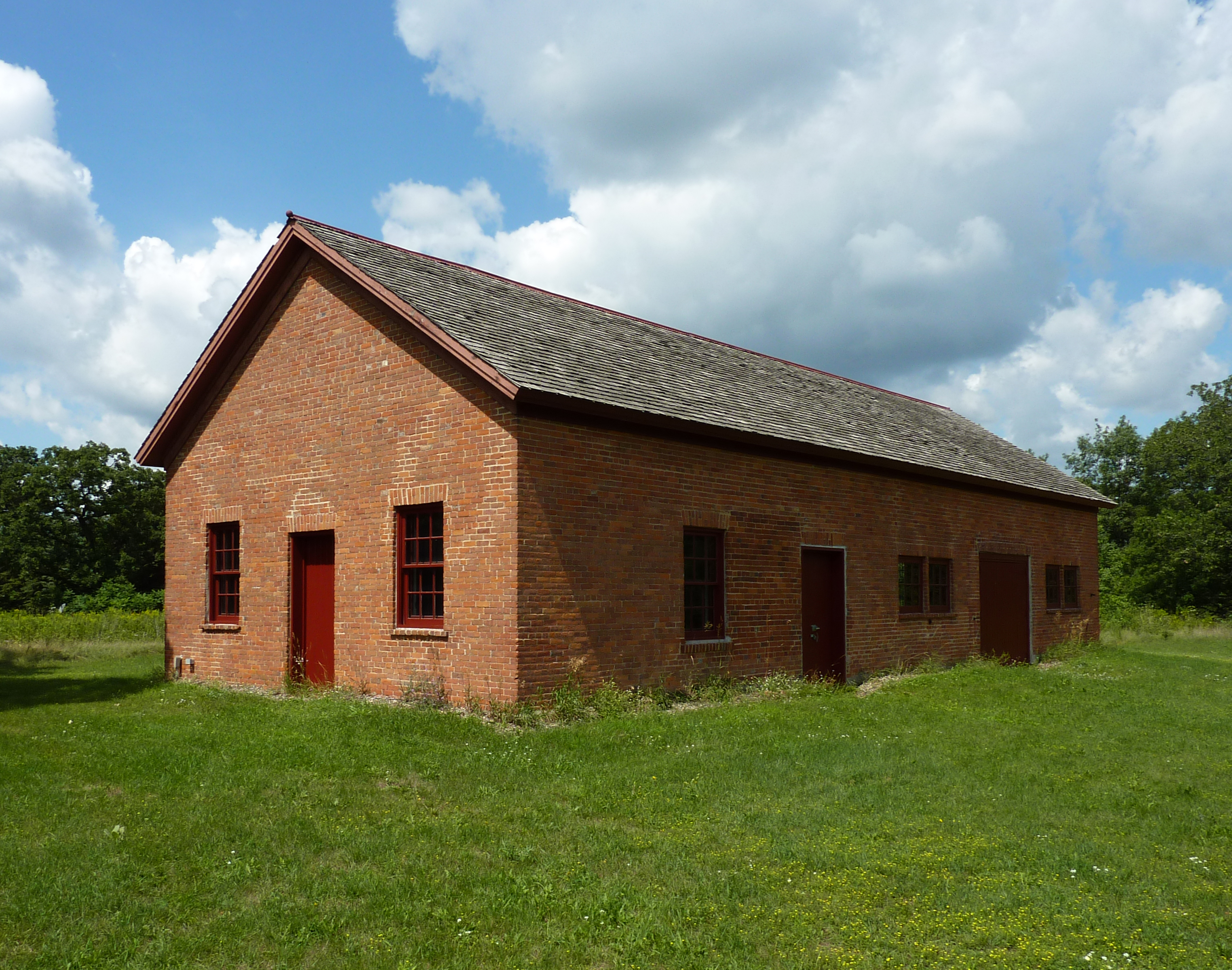
- The blacksmith building from the southeast
- Nearest city: North Oaks, Minnesota
- Built: 1883
- MPS: James J. Hill's North Oaks Farm Buildings MPS
- NRHP reference No.: 98000311
- Added to NRHP: September 9, 1999

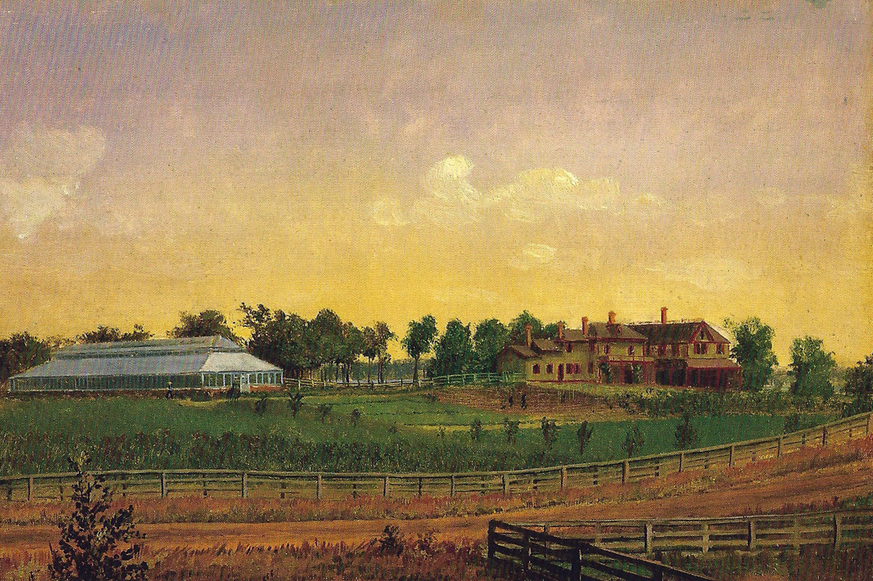
James J. Hill Estate at North Oaks Farm in 1914

North Oaks Farm, also known as Hill Farm, is an open-air museum in North Oaks, Minnesota, United States, preserving buildings of a 3,300-acre (1,300 ha) demonstration farm established by railroad magnate James J. Hill in 1883. Elements of the farm were listed on the National Register of Historic Places as James J. Hill's North Oaks Farm, Dairy Building in 1999.

In the Dairy Building, Hill had installed a DeLaval separator and barrel churns, which automated the production of butter, using centrifugal force powered by a steam engine. The operation was a forerunner of the modern commercial butter-making industry.

At the Blacksmith and Machine Shop horses were shod and hinges and wagon wheels were constructed for use on the farm.

== History ==
In 1883 James J. Hill purchased 3,500 acres of land in Ramsey County for $50,000 which would become North Oaks Farm. Later, Hill purchased additional land that expanded the farm to nearly 5,500 acres.

For the first ten years, the North Oaks Farm operated as a stock farm and base for Hill's efforts to breed a dual-purpose cow. The concept of breeding beef cows that would also produce milk was very popular during this time. Although Hill invested an enormous amount of money to breed a hybrid beef/dairy cow, his dairy results were marginal, while the beef was considered excellent. It seemed impossible at the time to have a cow that could be exceptional at both. However, the experience Hill and his workers received during this endeavor went on to help them in other ways. The North Oaks Farm gained a reputation for breeding exceptional beef cattle. Each year his Aberdeen Angus and Shorthorn cows from North Oaks would travel by train to Chicago to take part in the Fat Stock Show. The cattle won several prizes at the show over the years. In 1889 alone his Aberdeen Angus brought home $700 in prizes from Chicago.

The farm also served as Hill's country estate. The Hill family spent most of the summer at the farm in a large brick estate that overlooked Pleasant Lake. The family always entertained guests at the farm in the weeks surrounding Independence Day. Favorite activities included fishing and swimming at Pleasant Lake, riding horses, shooting, and going for country drives. Hill was eager to show his farm off to visitors and guests and could spend hours giving tours of the facilities and fields.

James J. Hill managed all of the landscaping at North Oaks and spared no expense—he spent $2,500 alone in 1914. His wife, Mary Hill, was in charge of deciding which vegetables and flowers would be grown each year since she oversaw a staff of cooks and servants that would use them at their mansion in St. Paul.

After Hill's death in 1916, the operation of the North Oaks Farm fell to his son, Louis Hill Sr., who shared his father's passion for farming. It wasn’t until Louis Hill Jr.’s death in 1948 that the farmland was divided in the 1950s into smaller parcels for a residential development. The grand estate on the lakeshore was demolished, along with the greenhouses and barns. Only three of the original forty buildings remain; the creamery, granary, and blacksmith shop/engine house.

After their deaths, both James J. Hill and Mary Hill were interred in a private mausoleum at North Oaks Farm. Their remains were later moved to Resurrection Cemetery in Mendota Heights.
