= North Oaks, Minnesota =

City in Minnesota, United States

- City
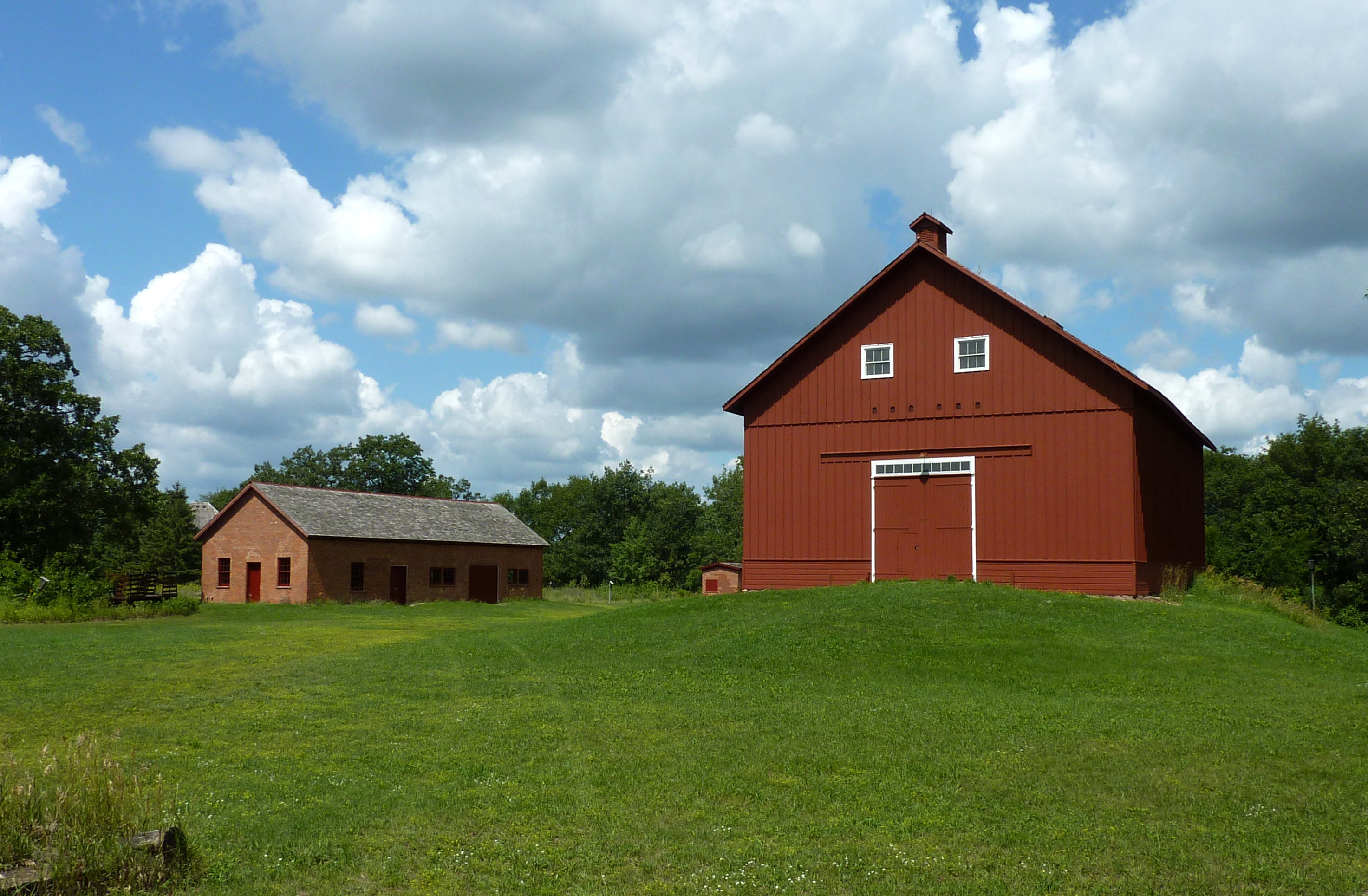
- The remaining buildings of North Oaks Farm are preserved by the city.

- Logo

- Location of the city of North Oaks within Ramsey County, Minnesota
- Coordinates: 45°05′59″N 93°07′10″W
- Country: United States
- State: Minnesota
- County: Ramsey
- Established: 1883

Area
  - Total: 8.62 sq mi (22.33 km^{2})
  - Land: 6.91 sq mi (17.90 km^{2})
  - Water: 1.71 sq mi (4.43 km^{2})
- Elevation: 892 ft (272 m)

Population (2020)
  - Total: 5,272
  - Density: 763.0/sq mi (294.58/km^{2})
- Time zone: UTC-6 (Central (CST))
  - Summer (DST): UTC-5 (CDT)
- ZIP codes: 55126, 55127
- Area code: 651
- FIPS code: 27-47104
- GNIS feature ID: 2395259
- Website: www.northoaksmn.gov

North Oaks is an exurban city 10 miles (16 km) north of St. Paul in Ramsey County in the U.S. state of Minnesota. The population was 5,272 at the 2020 census.

Formerly a gated community that now posts private access signage, all land is owned by homeowners with the North Oaks Home Owners Association maintaining all roads, plowing, parks, facilities, and recreation trails. Each homeowner's property extends halfway into the street. There is also a city government with a Mayor and City Council that administers basic services such as fire, police, planning, and licensing. The city owns no property.

== History ==
Structured around Pleasant Lake, the area began as a water source for the Saint Paul municipal water system, which still maintains water access rights today. The land was later purchased by Saint Paul magnate James J. Hill in 1883 and expanded into a 5,000-acre (20 km^{2}) breeding and hobby farm.

Hill's son, Louis, later owned North Oaks Farm until his death in 1948. Ownership passed to Louis' children who decided to develop the land into a model residential community. They incorporated the North Oaks Company with a mission to build with respect for the natural environment, having witnessed metropolitan sprawl during this time. To ensure their mission would be fulfilled, land was subdivided and sold with a warranty deed that created the North Oaks Home Owners’ Association (NOHOA) to be responsible for roads and recreation. Each deed placed each home's property line halfway into the street, placing all roads into private ownership.

The remaining land in the city is owned by the North Oaks Company. The original farm buildings have been restored with informational displays. They are not open to the public, however, as North Oaks is private. Two of the remaining structures, the Blacksmith Shop and Machine Shop and Dairy Building, are listed on the National Register of Historic Places.

In May 2008, NOHOA sent a letter to internet search company Google, stating that its Street View software contained images that violated their trespassing ordinance, and requested their removal. Google complied.

On 15 January 2026, YouTuber Chris Parr, publishing as Christheproducer, uploaded a collection of images to Street View mapping the North Oaks region. This was done in an attempt to make every city in the US have mapped streets on the service. However, the imagery has since been removed from the public map, save for a single image.

== Geography ==
According to the United States Census Bureau, the city has a total area of 8.63 square miles (22.35 km^{2}), of which 6.92 square miles (17.92 km^{2}) is land and 1.71 square miles (4.43 km^{2}) is water.

== Demographics ==
Historical population
Census	Pop.	Note	%±
1960	803		—
1970	2,002		149.3%
1980	2,846		42.2%
1990	3,386		19.0%
2000	3,883		14.7%
2010	4,469		15.1%
2020	5,272		18.0%
U.S. Decennial Census

=== 2020 census ===
As of the 2020 census, North Oaks had a population of 5,272, with 1,972 households and 1,605 families. The median age was 49.8 years. 23.5% of residents were under the age of 18, 4.8% were from 18 to 24, 15.9% were from 25 to 44, 26.1% were from 45 to 64, and 29.7% were 65 years of age or older. For every 100 females there were 99.5 males, and for every 100 females age 18 and over there were 95.4 males age 18 and over.

The population density was 763.0 per square mile (294.6/km^{2}). There were 2,104 housing units at an average density of 304.5 per square mile (117.6/km^{2}), of which 6.3% were vacant. The homeowner vacancy rate was 1.1% and the rental vacancy rate was 4.2%. 100.0% of residents lived in urban areas, while 0.0% lived in rural areas.

Of all households, 32.3% had children under the age of 18 living in them, 75.7% were married-couple households, 8.2% were households with a male householder and no spouse or partner present, and 13.6% were households with a female householder and no spouse or partner present. About 16.9% of all households were made up of individuals, and 14.6% had someone living alone who was 65 years of age or older.

Racial composition as of the 2020 census
Race	Number	Percent
White	4,540	86.1%
Black or African American	40	0.8%
American Indian and Alaska Native	6	0.1%
Asian	402	7.6%
Native Hawaiian and Other Pacific Islander	0	0.0%
Some other race	28	0.5%
Two or more races	256	4.9%
Hispanic or Latino (of any race)	119	2.3%

=== Demographic estimates ===
The 2016–2020 5-year American Community Survey estimates show that the average household size was 2.7 and the average family size was 3.1. The percent of those with a bachelor’s degree or higher was estimated to be 52.0% of the population.

=== Income and poverty ===
The 2016–2020 5-year American Community Survey estimates show that the median household income was $210,370 (with a margin of error of +/- $33,217). The median family income was greater than $250,000. Males had a median income of $128,200 (+/- $42,542) versus $54,477 (+/- $23,596) for females. The median income for those above 16 years old was $80,795 (+/- $13,783). Approximately, 2.3% of families and 2.5% of the population were below the poverty line, including 0.0% of those under the age of 18 and 3.6% of those ages 65 or over.

=== 2010 census ===
As of the census of 2010, there were 4,469 people, 1,746 households, and 1,378 families residing in the city. The population density was 645.8 inhabitants per square mile (249.3/km^{2}). There were 1,868 housing units at an average density of 269.9 per square mile (104.2/km^{2}). The racial makeup of the city was 93.0% White, 0.4% African American, 0.2% Native American, 5.2% Asian, 0.1% from other races, and 1.1% from two or more races. Hispanic or Latino of any race were 1.2% of the population.

There were 1,746 households, of which 27.5% had children under the age of 18 living with them, 74.3% were married couples living together, 3.1% had a female householder with no husband present, 1.5% had a male householder with no wife present, and 21.1% were non-families. 18.9% of all households were made up of individuals, and 14% had someone living alone who was 65 years of age or older. The average household size was 2.49 and the average family size was 2.84.

The median age in the city was 53.1 years. 20.9% of residents were under the age of 18; 4.1% were between the ages of 18 and 24; 11.7% were from 25 to 44; 37.7% were from 45 to 64; and 25.6% were 65 years of age or older. The gender makeup of the city was 48.2% male and 51.8% female.

=== 2000 census ===
As of the census of 2000, there were 3,883 people, 1,300 households, and 1,177 families residing in the city. The population density was 531.0 inhabitants per square mile (205.0/km^{2}). There were 1,332 housing units at an average density of 182.1 per square mile (70.3/km^{2}). The racial makeup of the city was 93.33% White, 0.31% African American, 0.15% Native American, 4.61% Asian, 0.03% Pacific Islander, 0.57% from other races, and 1.00% from two or more races. Hispanic or Latino of any race were 1.21% of the population.

There were 1,300 households, out of which 41.5% had children under the age of 18 living with them, 86.5% were married couples living together, 2.6% had a female householder with no husband present, and 9.4% were non-families. 7.6% of all households were made up of individuals, and 3.2% had someone living alone who was 65 years of age or older. The average household size was 2.92 and the average family size was 3.08.

In the city, the population was spread out, with 27.6% under the age of 18, 4.7% from 18 to 24, 17.6% from 25 to 44, 38.5% from 45 to 64, and 11.6% who were 65 years of age or older. The median age was 45 years. For every 100 females, there were 99.2 males. For every 100 females age 18 and over, there were 96.0 males.

The median income for a household in the city was $149,158, and the median income for a family was $152,380. Males had a median income of $100,000 versus $47,019 for females. The per capita income for the city was $72,686. None of the families and 1.9% of the population were living below the poverty line, including no under-eighteens and 9.6% of those over 64. North Oaks is listed among the highest-income places in the United States.

== Sports ==
=== Golf ===
- North Oaks Golf Club

== Notable people ==
- Joe Alt (born 2003), NFL player
- Marc Asch (born 1946), Minnesota state representative
- Sydney Brodt (born 1998), ice hockey player with the PWHPA and the U.S. women's national team
- Mike Hoeffel (born 1989), ice hockey player with the Iserlohn Roosters
- Paul Moga (born 1972), U.S. Air Force major general
- Walter Mondale (1928–2021), 42nd Vice President of the United States
- John William Vessey Jr. (1922–2016), U.S. Army general and 10th Chairman of the Joint Chiefs of Staff
