= Francis Missia =

Roman Catholic priest

Reverend Francis Missia
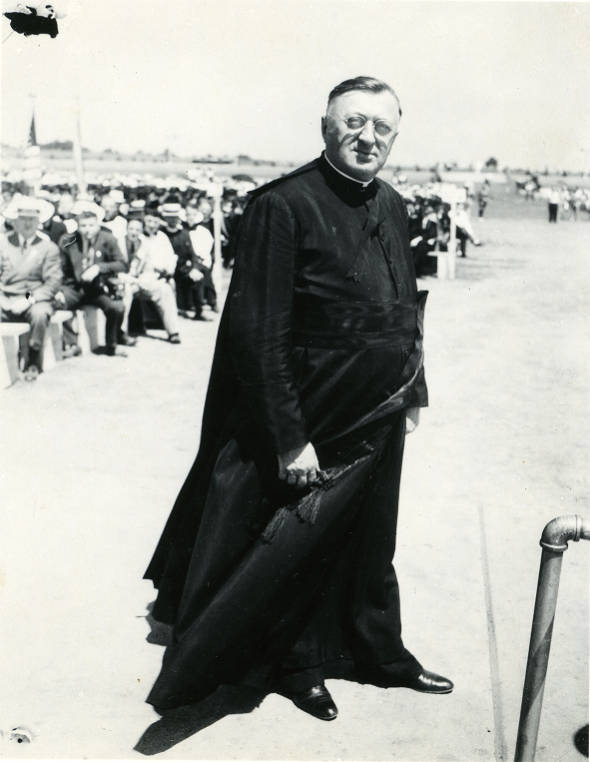
- Fr. Missia at the Eucharistic Congress at the Minnesota State Fairgrounds in 1941

Orders
- Ordination: June 11, 1908

Personal details
- Born: January 26, 1884 Mota, Ljutomer, Slovenia
- Died: May 21, 1955 (aged 71) Hudson, Wisconsin, US
- Buried: Resurrection Cemetery in Mendota Heights
- Denomination: Roman Catholic

Francis A. Missia (January 26, 1884 – May 21, 1955) was a Roman Catholic priest of the Archdiocese of Saint Paul. Born in Mota, Ljutomer, Austria (present-day Slovenia), he emigrated to the United States in 1903 and played an important role in liturgical music as one of the most prominent Catholic choirmasters in the Midwest and Northwest United States during the 20th century.

== Early life ==
Missia was born in Slovenia on January 26, 1884, in Mota, in what was at the time the Austro-Hungarian Empire, and baptized Franz Missia. At the prompting of his uncle, Monsignor Jakob Missia, he studied at the Jesuits' Kalksburg College on the outskirts of Vienna. His education focused on classical and musical studies.

Elevated to the see of Gorizia in 1897, Archbishop Jakob Missia encountered Archbishop John Ireland of the Diocese of Saint Paul. With this connection, Francis Missia went to the United States in August 1903 to attend the Saint Paul Seminary, knowing no English at the time. He showed great musical talent, and in his diaconate year of 1907 he was placed in charge of the choir at the seminary.

== Priesthood ==
Fr. Missia was ordained to the priesthood on June 11, 1908. For the next 48 years until his death, he was a professor and the director of sacred music at the Saint Paul Seminary. Within two years, he directed the choir for the consecration of six bishops on May 19, 1910, at the seminary.

When Archbishop John Gregory Murray established a Sacred Music Commission in 1932, he placed Father Missia in charge. Missia later established the Saint Paul Catholic Choral Society and the Guild of Catholic Choirmasters and Organists.

He edited a hymnal for the Ninth National Eucharistic Congress in Saint Paul in 1941. He directed several choirs for the Masses of the congress held at the Minnesota State Fairgrounds. The children's choir consisted of 20,000 Catholic schoolchildren and the adult choir was over 1,000 voices from both of the Twin Cities.

Missia directed number recordings of the Saint Paul Seminary choir released through Kay Bank Studios.

== Death and legacy ==
Missia died on May 21, 1955, near Hudson, Wisconsin, after the car he was in collided with the rear of a truck. He was returning from his cabin. Bishop John Gregory Murray celebrated the Requiem Mass, and Bishop Francis Schenk of Crookston preached the sermon. He is buried at Resurrection Cemetery in Mendota Heights.

To this day, a piece he arranged, Tu Es Sacerdos in Aeternum (composed by Vojtěch Říhovský), is still used at ordinations for the diocese.
