= Resurrection Cemetery (Mendota Heights, Minnesota) =

Catholic cemetery in Minnesota

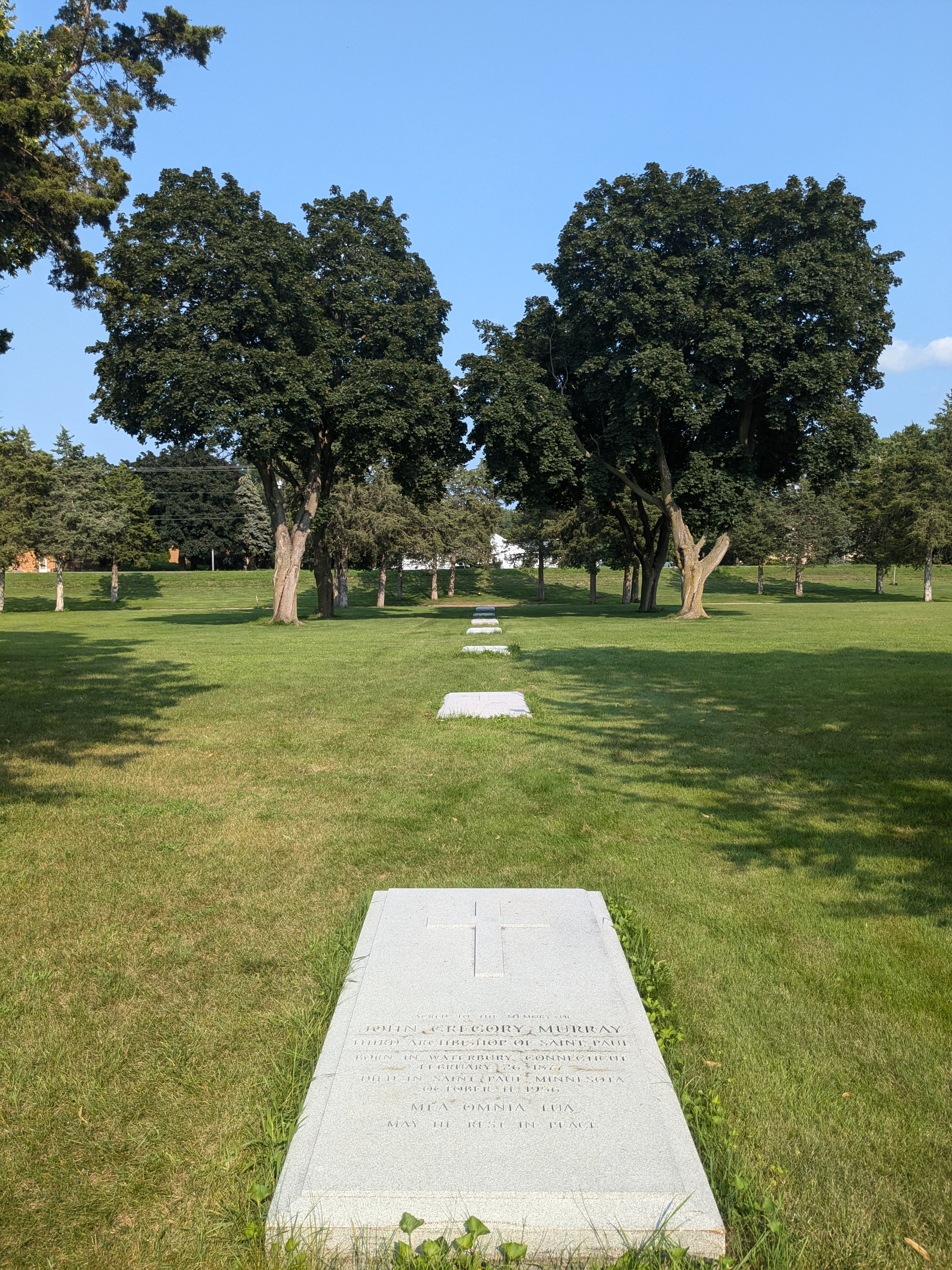
- The graves of the bishops in the clergy section of the cemetery
- Interactive map of Resurrection Cemetery

Details
- Established: 1940
- Location: 2101 Lexington Avenue S. Mendota Heights, MN 55120
- Coordinates: 44.8789°N 93.1484°W
- Type: Catholic
- Owned by: Archdiocese of Saint Paul and Minneapolis
- Size: 350 acres (140 ha)
- No. of interments: 45,000
- Website: Official website
- Find a Grave: Resurrection Cemetery

Resurrection Cemetery is a Catholic cemetery in Mendota Heights, Minnesota, established in 1940.

== History ==
With Calvary Cemetery running out of room, Resurrection cemetery was established in 1940. Archbishop John Gregory Murray consecrated the cemetery on June 30, 1940. With land in Minnesota rapidly being purchased, and seeing the need to secure land for Catholic burials, Archbishop Austin Dowling had purchased 350 acres of prairie in Mendota for $400,000 some years prior.

Resurrection began offering green burials in 2019, in an area dedicated that May by Archbishop Bernard Hebda. A section is dedicated especially to the burial of priests and bishops.

== Notable interments ==
- Leo Binz, archbishop of St. Paul and Minneapolis from 1962 to 1975
- Leo Christopher Byrne, coadjutor archbishop Saint Paul and Minneapolis from 1967 to 1974
- Harry Joseph Flynn, archbishop of Saint Paul and Minneapolis from 1995 to 2008
- James J. Hill, American railroad executive. Originally buried on his North Oaks farm but reinterred at Resurrection.
- Louis W. Hill, American railroad executive and son of James J. Hill
- Francis Missia, Catholic priest and musician
- John Gregory Murray, archbishop of Saint Paul from 1931 to 1956
- James Michael Reardon, rector of the Basilica of Saint Mary and historian
- John Roach, archbishop of Saint Paul and Minneapolis from 1975 to 1995
- Larry Rosenthal, pitcher for the Chicago White Sox
- Bob Short, former owner of the Minneapolis / Los Angeles Lakers
