= Kalksburg College =

Location
- Kalksburg, Vienna, Austria
- Coordinates: 48.1345°N 16.2454°E

Information
- Type: Gymnasium
- Denomination: Catholic (Jesuit)
- Established: 1856; 170 years ago
- Gender: Coeducational
- Affiliation: Association of Religious Schools in Austria
- Website: Kalksburg College

Kalksburg College, also known as College of the Immaculate Virgin, is a Catholic private school according to public law in the 23rd district of Liesing in Vienna, Austria.

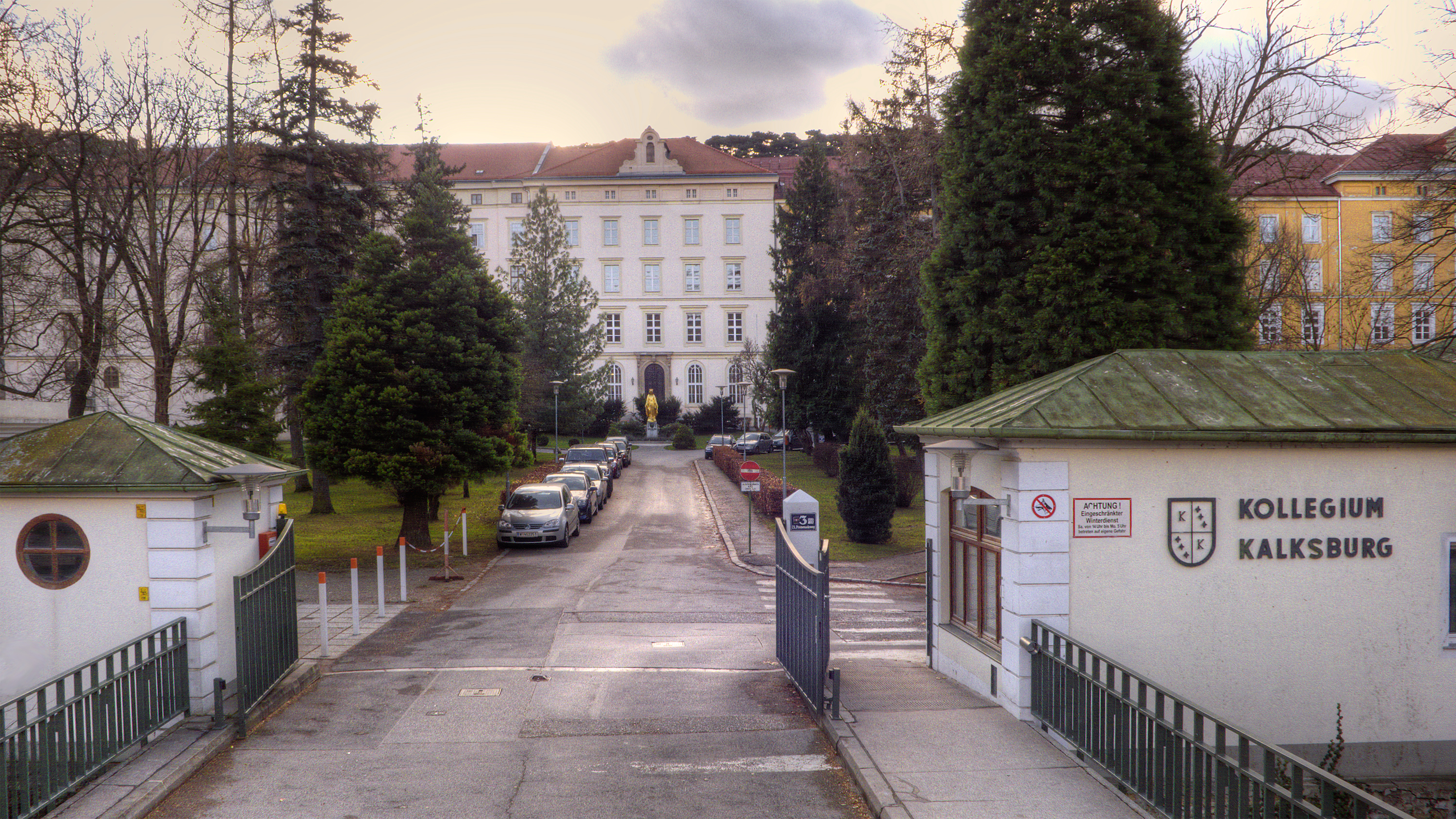

== History ==
The Mon Pérou Palace, built in the 18th century, was replaced by the collegiate edifice. It was the seat of Princess Carolina of Trautson, a court maid of Maria Theresa, and was acquired in 1791 by the court jeweler Franz von Mack, who made the existing landscape garden around the castle. The Jesuits purchased the castle in 1856 from August Godeffroy, the husband of a granddaughter Franz von Macks. The transaction was financially supported by Emperor Franz Joseph.

The main building of the college was gradually and partly built on the foundation walls of the Mon Pérou Palace. On 3 October 1856, today's lower part of the building was consecrated by Cardinal Joseph Othmar von Rauscher of the Immaculate Conception, which had just been proclaimed a Roman Catholic faith dogma. The house was occupied by 68 pupils. In 1857, the building was expanded by the present part of the gate and a mirrored part of the rectory. In 1858/59 the three-storey building of the convent (today's Gymnasium) was completed. In 1875 a large fire from the former workshops destroyed part of the building. In the last quarter of the nineteenth century reconstructions were carried out, the reconstruction of the hostel and rectory as well as the construction of the music-house with a gymnasium before the hostel. The first edition of the Schulzeitschrift Kalksburger Korrespondenz was published in 1886. In 1897, the school received the right to publicize all classes as well as the legal maturity tests, after it had already been granted the public right for the first three classes in 1891. From 1902 until his death in 1931, Anton Straub served as chaplain and theologian there. In 1904 Karl Maria von Andlau, (1865-1935) became the rector of the house. He later became the Jesuit Provincial Superior and a confidant of the Emperor Charles I of Austria.

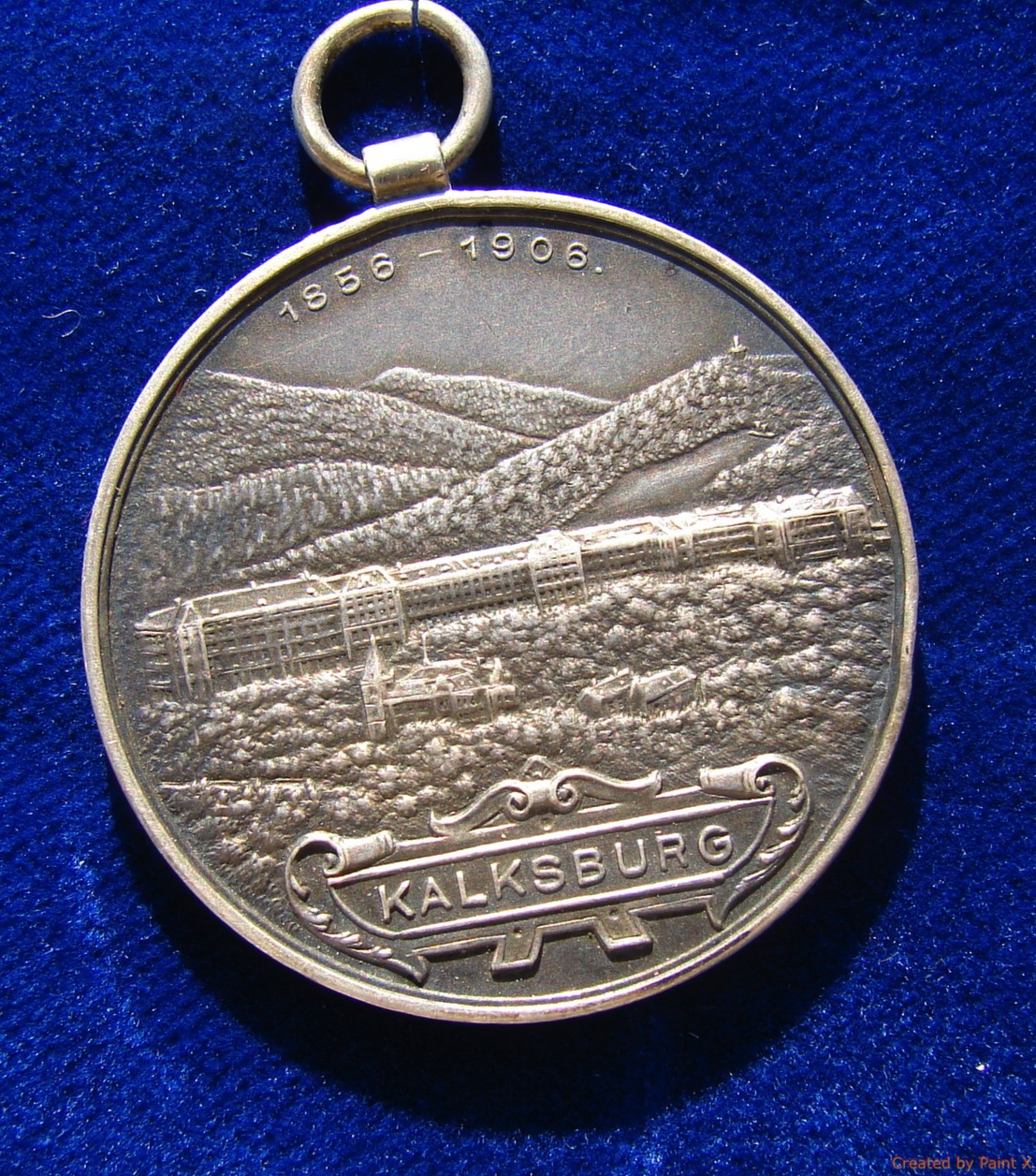
50-year medal of Kollegium Kalksburg

After the Anschluss in 1938 the Jesuit College was dissolved by the National Socialists. Until 1945, a police school was housed in the main building. The occupying troops after the Second World War left the house in 1947. In the autumn of the same year classes resumed, but from 1948 to 1951 part of the collegiate building was still used by the Red Army. In July 1954, the first post-war matriculation was held. The first half-years were in 1964, the year with the lowest number of pupils (241) after the war. In 1968 the Father General of the Jesuits Pedro Arrupe visited Kalksburg, the same year the Jesuit Stella Matutina College in Feldkirch was closed. Significant changes were undertaken under the rector Rudolf Reichlin-Meldegg (even Old kalksburger). More recent directors of the gymnasium have been Erich Schmutz (1969-1994), Walter Schauer (1994-2004), and Michael Dobes (2004- ).

In 1969, Erich Schmutz took over the position of the first director of the gymnasium, which had previously been run by the Jesuits. The year 1972 saw the construction of a new, larger gymnasium after 75 years. The coeducation of boys and girls was introduced in 1983. In 1990 the boarding school was abandoned. For personnel reasons, the Jesuits sought the formation of the union of religious schools in Austria. In 1993 the college became the first school which was run by this sponsoring group. In the same year a school was set up which started the school year 1993/94 with two first-year classes. In 1999, the Kollegium Kalksburg designed the Willergasse park and built the sculpture "Living Liesing". In the following year, the school was awarded a Science Week prize and conducted the exhibition "Living Liesing" in the Volkshalle of the Vienna City Hall. In 1999, the fourth floor was expanded for the center for crafts and artistic education, and in 2001 the new library building with a connected computer room and student buffet was opened. A year later the façade of the east wing was renovated. The gymnasium of 1972 was replaced in 2003 by a two-storey new building with a climbing wall. Numerous events took place at the 150th anniversary of the college in 2006, including a festive exhibition with Cardinal Christoph Schönborn and a pilgrimage to the Mariazell Basilica.

From the work of the Klasnic commission which dealt with exposing sexual abuse in ecclesiastical institutions, cases in the college of Kalksburg were also investigated. Among other things, the former student André Heller in numerous interviews reported borderline experiences and stated abuse was "part of a terrible reality". On the part of the College the allegations have been contested.

== Location and architecture ==
=== Main building ===
The College is located to the south of Kalksburg on the edge of the Vienna Woods. The long main building can be reached via a bridge over the Liesingbach. It consists of the four-storey school and the rectory and fathers' tract, to the west in the form of an honorary court. The main building has several chapels. The Marian Congregation Chapel and the Rectory Chapel were built between 1895 and 1897, largely during this period of construction. A Maria Immaculata painting by Leopold Kupelwieser was installed on the altarpiece at the altar retable, and the windows above the arcades were made by the Tyrolean Glass Painting and Mosaic Institute. The convent chapel contains the travel tale of Napoléon Bonaparte. The collegiate chapel on the back of the rectory and father's yard shows a fresco by Bengt Olof Kälde from 1986. The former Guardian Angel Chapel is a simple room dating back to 1900.

=== Park and secondary building ===
The park of the College goes back to the Mack'sche landscaped garden from the 18th century. The so-called monument is a circular pavilion built in the style of the architect Claude-Nicolas Ledoux. The obelisks with ball and star on the inner walls point to Masonic symbols. The Michaels Chapel, situated on a hill, was completed in 1858/59 by the reconstruction and extension of a Diana temple built by Mack. There is also a small Chinese pagoda, the so-called "Chineser", as well as the so-called smoking temple, a pavilion originally built for the Greeks in the 7th and 8th gymnasium classes on the occasion of the World Exhibition 1873, and in which smoking, unlike the rest of the building, was not forbidden. In the former "small garden" of Franz von Mack stands the stone house built in 1787, one of the most important secular Neo-Gothic buildings in Austria, with a remarkable interior design.

== Notable alumni ==
- Francis Missia (1884–1955), priest and choirmaster

== See also ==
- List of Jesuit sites
