= Louis Warren Hill Jr. =

American politician (1902–1995)

Louis Warren Hill Jr
- Born: Louis Hill; May 19, 1902; Saint Paul, Minnesota, U.S.
- Died: April 6, 1995 (aged 92); North Oaks, Minnesota, U.S.
- Education: Phillips Exeter Academy; Yale University; University of Minnesota; Oxford University
- Parent(s): Louis W. Hill, Maud Van Cortlandt Taylor
- Relatives: James J. Hill (grandfather); Jerome Hill (brother)

Louis Warren Hill Jr. (May 19, 1902 – April 6, 1995) was an American businessman and politician. He was the son of Louis W. Hill and Maud Van Cortlandt Taylor. His grandfather was railroad tycoon James J. Hill.

Hill was born in Saint Paul, Minnesota. He attended Saint Paul Academy and graduated from Phillips Exeter Academy in 1920. Hill went to the University of Minnesota, to Yale University, and to Oxford University. Hill was involved with the Great Northern Railway and the banking business in Saint Paul, Minnesota. He served in the Minnesota Senate from 1937 to 1952. He died at his home in North Oaks, Minnesota and was buried in Mendota Heights, Minnesota.
