= Film Portrait =

- Directed by: Jerome Hill
- Produced by: Barbara Stone; David C. Stone
- Starring: Jerome Hill
- Release date: 1972
- Running time: 81 minutes
- Country: United States
- Language: English

Film Portrait (1972) is a full-length autobiographical film directed by, and about, the life of Minnesotan film-maker and artist, Jerome Hill.

== Summary ==
Jerome Hill died shortly after the completion of Film Portrait, and so the work is often described as his memoir from his privileged childhood in the Midwest to his restless adult years.

== Legacy ==
In 2003, Film Portrait was selected for preservation in the National Film Registry at the Library of Congress, recognizing the cultural, historical and aesthetic significance of the work, as well as ensuring the original film footage itself is kept safely preserved alongside new archival copies.

== See also ==
- List of American films of 1972
- Jerome Hill
- Metafilm
