= Albert Schweitzer (film) =

1957 American documentary film

- Directed by: Jerome Hill
- Written by: Albert Schweitzer; Thomas Bruce Morgan
- Produced by: Jerome Hill
- Narrated by: Fredric March; Burgess Meredith
- Cinematography: Erica Anderson
- Edited by: Luke Bennett
- Distributed by: Louis de Rochemont Associates
- Release date: November 22, 1957
- Running time: 85 minutes
- Country: United States
- Language: English

Albert Schweitzer is a 1957 American biographical documentary about Albert Schweitzer directed by Jerome Hill. It won the Academy Award for Best Documentary Feature for 1958.

== Cast ==
- Fredric March – Voice of Albert Schweitzer
- Albert Schweitzer – Himself
- Phillip Eckert – Young Albert Schweitzer
- Adele Woytt – Albert Schweitzer's Mother
- Burgess Meredith – Narrator

== See also ==
- List of American films of 1957
- Jerome Hill
