= Marc Asch =

American politician and health care consultant

- Born: June 27, 1946 (age 80)
- Occupations: Politician and health care consultant

Marc Asch III (born June 27, 1946) was an American politician and health care consultant.

Asch lived in North Oaks, Minnesota with his wife and kids. He moved to Minnesota in 1987. Asch received his bachelor's degree in government from Oberlin College and his master's degree in political science from Michigan State University. He worked for the Michigan Department of Social Services, the United States National Institute of Health and as an aide to United States Senator Howard Metzenbaum. Asch served in the Minnesota House of Representatives in 1993 and 1994 and was a Democrat.
