= James J. Hill Center =

- U.S. National Register of Historic Places
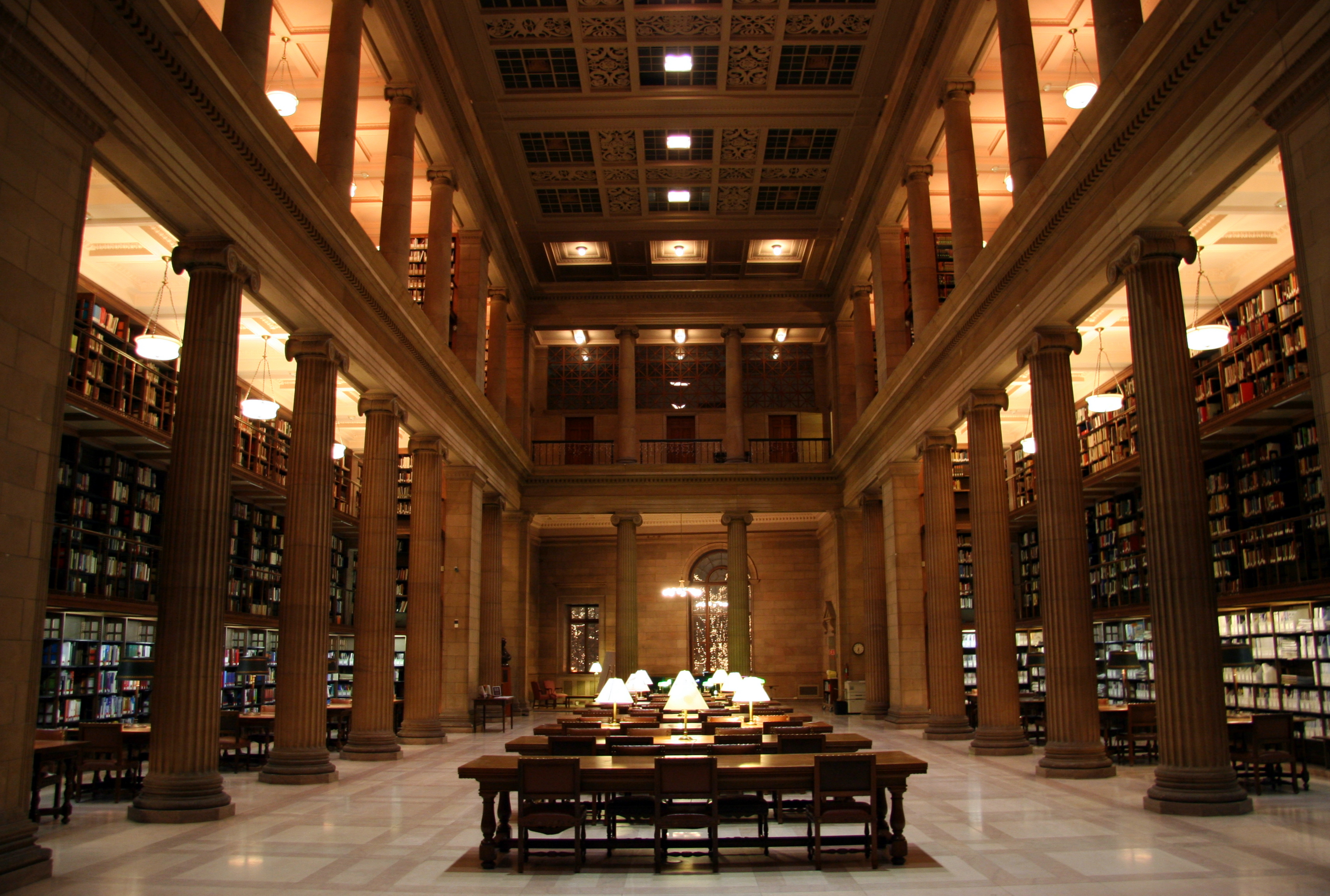

- Location within Minnesota Location within the United States
- Location: 80 W. 4th St. St. Paul, Minnesota
- Coordinates: 44°56′38.17″N 93°5′48.16″W
- Built: 1916
- Architect: Electus D. Litchfield
- Architectural style: Renaissance
- NRHP reference No.: 75001017
- Added to NRHP: September 11, 1975

The James J. Hill Center (originally the James J. Hill Reference Library) was a privately funded business research library at 80 West Fourth Street in Saint Paul, Minnesota. On July 3, 2019, the library closed to the public citing unsustainable operating costs and needed capital improvements. Until 2019 it was open to the public and its resources could be used for free on site. In addition, the Center hosted business and social events in its historic reading room. On November 18, 2019, the center announced it had put the building up for sale. The library is part of the civic legacy of James J. Hill. In June 2021, the Minneapolis-based company First & First bought the building with the intent for it to be used as an event center.

The James J. Hill Center was completed after his death and funded by his widow, Mary T. Hill, and children Mary Hill, Rachel Hill Boeckmann, Clara Hill Lindley, Louis W. Hill, and Charlotte Hill Slade. It was added to the National Register of Historic Places in 1975.
