= Jerome Hill =

American film director (1905–1972)

- Born: James Jerome Hill II; March 2, 1905; Saint Paul, Minnesota, U.S.
- Died: November 21, 1972 (aged 67); New York City, U.S.
- Education: Yale University
- Occupations: Painter, composer, director, writer, producer
- Known for: Ski Flight (1937); Grandma Moses (1950); Albert Schweitzer (1957); Film Portrait (1972)
- Parent(s): Louis W. Hill, Maud Van Cortlandt Taylor
- Relatives: James J. Hill (grandfather); Louis Warren Jr. (brother)
- Awards: 1957 Academy Award for Best Documentary Feature

James Jerome Hill II (March 2, 1905 – November 21, 1972) was an American filmmaker and artist known for his documentary and experimental films, one of which won him an Academy Award.

== Career ==
Hill was the child of railroad executive Louis W. Hill.

He was educated at Yale, where he drew covers, caricatures and cartoons for campus humor magazine The Yale Record.

His 1950 documentary Grandma Moses, written and narrated by Archibald MacLeish, was nominated for an Academy Award for Best Short Subject, Two-reel. He won the 1958 Academy Award for Best Documentary Feature for his film Albert Schweitzer.

In addition to making films, he was a painter and composer.

His last film, the autobiographical Film Portrait (1972), was added to the National Film Registry in 2003.

== Philanthropy ==
Hill founded the Jerome Foundation, which gives grants to non-profit arts organizations and artists in Minnesota and New York City. Hill started it as the Avon Foundation in 1964, but after his death it was renamed the Jerome Foundation. Among the projects the foundation funds is the American Composers Forum's Jerome Fund for New Music, which supports the creation of new works of music with grants to composers.

Hill also founded the Camargo Foundation in 1967, which administers a residency program for artists and scholars in Cassis, France.

== Personal life ==
Hill was a stakeholder in Sugar Bowl Ski Resort. He had a chalet built at Sugar Bowl and, while living there, paid for and operated "The Magic Carpet", the first aerial tramway on the west coast.

== Filmography (as director) ==
- 1932 La cartomancienne
- 1937 Ski Flight, featuring Otto Lang
- 1950 Grandma Moses, written and narrated by Archibald MacLeish
- 1950 Cassis
- 1957 Albert Schweitzer, won Academy Award for Best Documentary Feature
- 1961 The Sand Castle with Mabel Mercer
- 1964 Open the Door and see all the People
- 1965 Magic Umbrella
- 1966 Death in the Forenoon
- 1968 The Artist's Friend
- 1969 Canaries
- 1969 Merry Christmas
- 1972 Film Portrait, added to the National Film Registry in 2003
- 1991 Carl G. Jung or Lapis Philosophorum (material from an abandoned project, shot 1950, edited and published by Jonas Mekas)
