= Jakob Missia =

Slovene prelate (1838–1902)

His Eminence Jakob Missia
- Archbishop of Gorizia and Gradisca
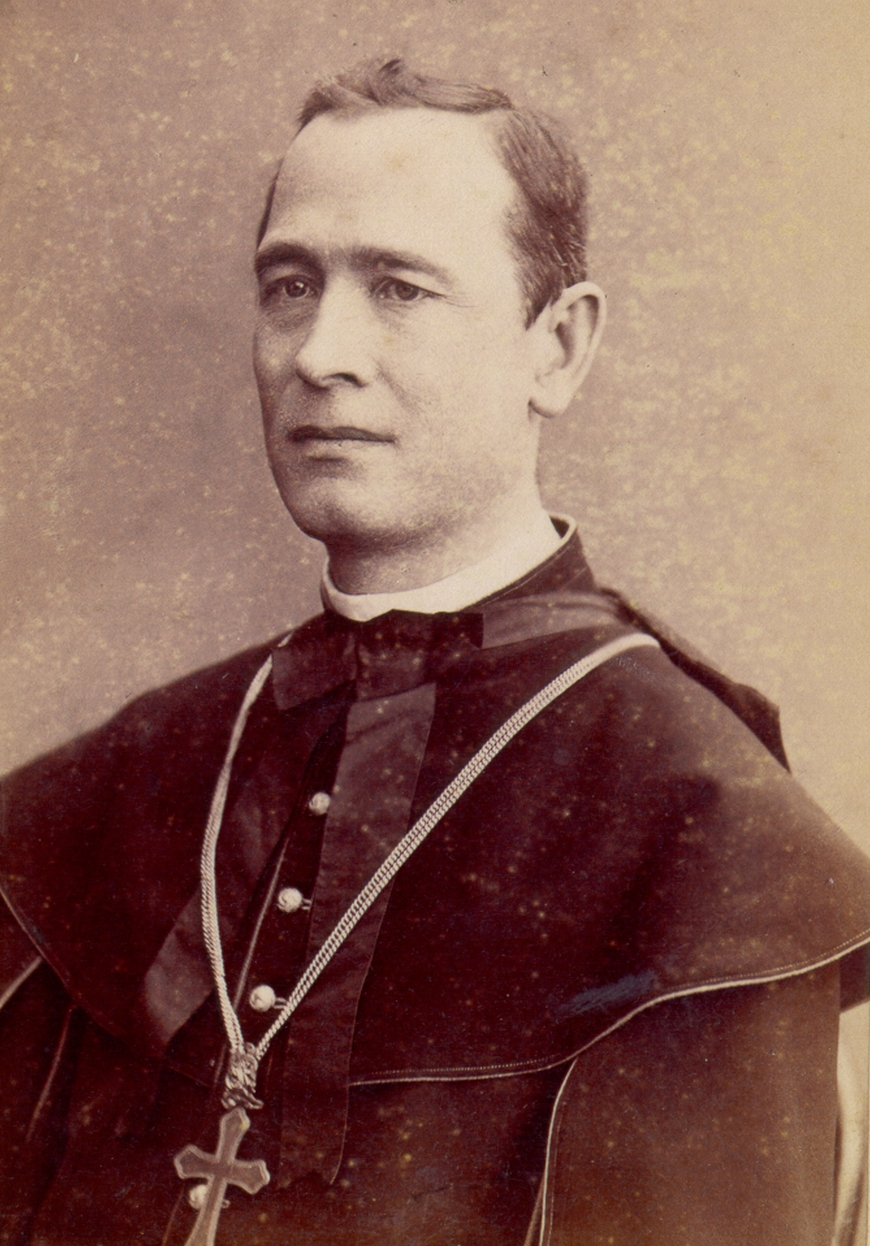
- Church: Roman Catholic Church
- Archdiocese: Gorizia and Gradisca
- See: Gorizia and Gradisca
- Appointed: 24 March 1898
- Term ended: 24 March 1902
- Predecessor: Alois Zorn
- Successor: Andreas Jordán
- Other post: Cardinal-Priest of Santo Stefano al Monte Celio (1899–1902)
- Previous post: Bishop of Ljubljana (1884-98)

Orders
- Ordination: 30 May 1863
- Consecration: 7 December 1884 by Johann Baptist Zwerger
- Created cardinal: 19 June 1899 by Pope Leo XIII
- Rank: Cardinal-Priest

Personal details
- Born: Jakob Missia; 30 June 1838 Mota, Gornja Radgona, Austrian Empire (now Slovenia)
- Died: 24 March 1902 (aged 63) Gorizia, Austria-Hungary (now Italy)
- Parents: Martin Missia; Agnes Pinteritsch
- Education: Pontifical Gregorian University
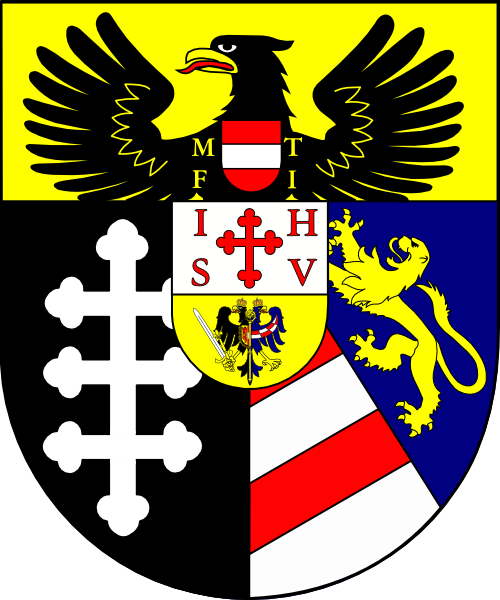
- Coat of arms

Jakob Missia (30 June 1838 – 24 March 1902) was a Slovene prelate of the Catholic Church who was Archbishop of Gorizia and Gradisca from 1898 until his death. He was made a cardinal in 1899, the first Slovenian to be given that rank. He was previously Bishop of Ljubljana from 1884 to 1898.

== Biography ==
Jakob Missia was born on 30 June 1838 in Mota in the Austrian Empire, now in Slovenia. He was baptized Jacobus Missia and was the youngest child in his family. An older brother became a priest. After training at the seminary of Lavant (Maribor), he studied philosophy and theology in Rome and was ordained a priest there on 30 May 1863. In August 1864 he received his doctorate in theology from the Pontifical Gregorian University.

He served as secretary to the bishop of Seckau and then chancellor of that diocese.

Missia was appointed bishop of Ljubljana on 10 November 1884. He received his episcopal consecration on 7 December 1884 in Graz from Johann Baptist Zwerger, the bishop of Seckau.

Ivan Hribar, Mayor of Ljubljana and an advocate of Slovenian nationalism, considered Missia pro-German and complained of him to the Vatican.

Upon the nomination of Emperor Franz Joseph I, Missia was transferred to the Archdiocese of Gorizia and Gradisca, now in Italy, on 24 March 1898.

Pope Leo XIII raised him to the rank of cardinal at the on 18 June 1899, granting the title of Santo Stefano Rotondo. Missia was the first Slovenian to become a cardinal.

He died in on 24 March 1902 in Gorizia.

His nephew and protégé Father Francis A. Missia (1884–1955) emigrated to the United States in 1903 and played an important role in 20th-century liturgical music. He was director of music at Saint Paul Seminary in Minnesota for 48 years.

== Bibliography ==
- Bräuer, Martin (2014). Handbuch der Kardinäle: 1846-2012 (in German). Berlin: De Gruyter. p. 187. ISBN 978-3-11-026947-5.
