= Lewis Hill (cricketer, born 1860) =

English cricketer

Lewis Gordon Hill (2 November 1860 – 27 August 1940) was an English first-class cricketer, who played one match for Yorkshire County Cricket Club against Derbyshire at the County Ground, Derby, in 1882. Batting at number three, he scored 5 and 8, took a catch but did not bowl, as Yorkshire ran out winners by seven wickets.

Hill was born in Manningham, Bradford, Yorkshire, England, and died in August 1940 in Heaton, Bradford.
