= Louis W. Hill =

American railroad executive (1872–1948)

Louis Warren Hill
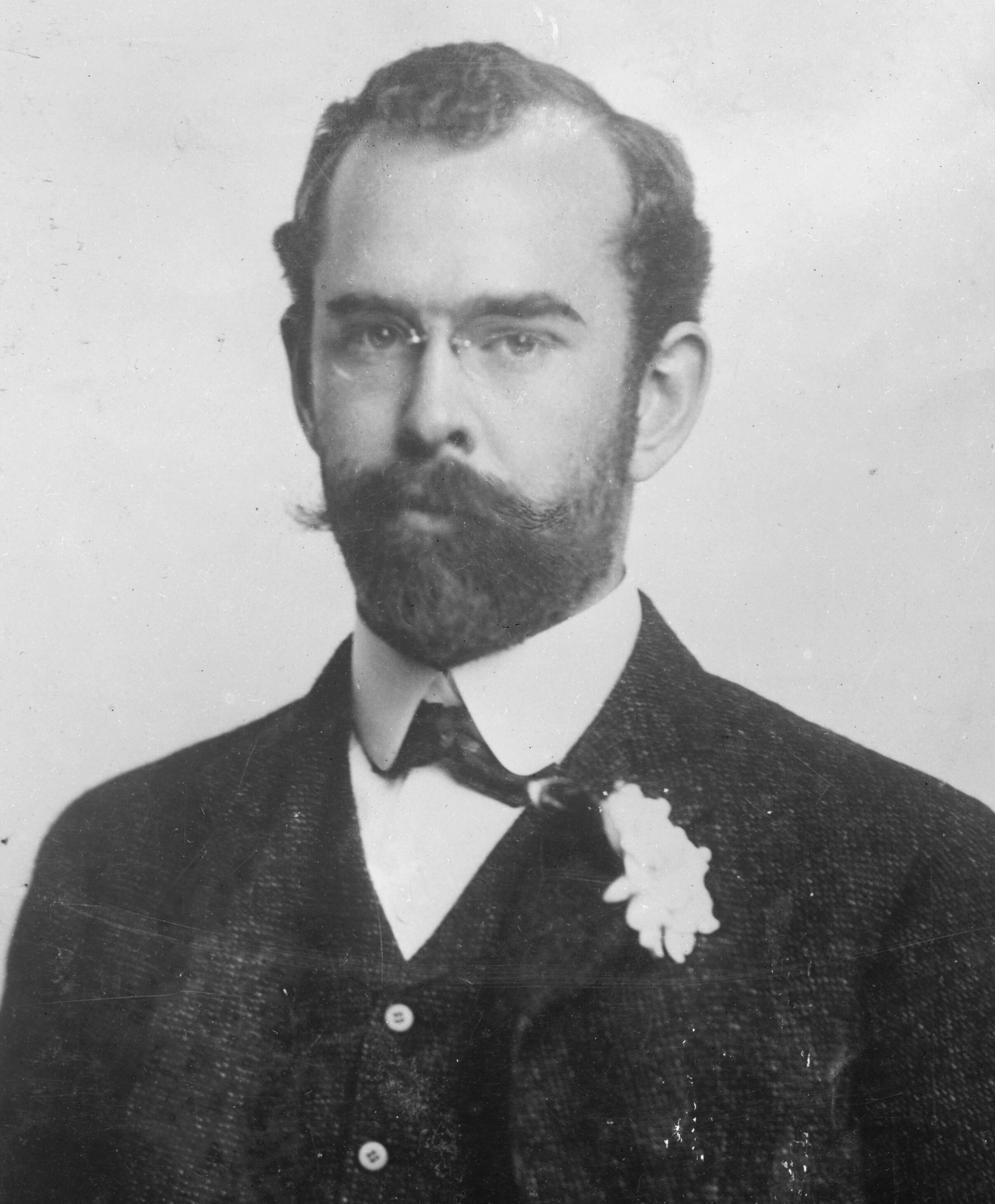
- Louis Hill in 1899
- Born: May 19, 1872; Saint Paul, Minnesota
- Died: April 27, 1948 (aged 75); Saint Paul, Minnesota
- Occupation: President of Great Northern Railway
- Spouse: Maud Van Cortlandt Taylor (m. 1901)
- Children: Louis Warren Jr.; Jerome Hill; Maud Van Cortlandt; Cortlandt Taylor
- Relatives: James J. Hill (father)

Louis Warren Hill (May 19, 1872– April 27, 1948), was an American railroad executive. He was the president and board chairman of the Great Northern Railway, which served a substantial area of the Upper Midwest, the northern Great Plains, and Pacific Northwest.

== Life ==
=== Family Roots ===
The third of James J. Hill and Mary Theresa (née Mehegan) Hill's ten children, Louis Warren Hill was born in St. Paul, Minnesota in 1872. He, along with his older brother James, was schooled at home before attending Phillips Exeter Academy in New Hampshire. He failed to complete the ancient languages requirement for acceptance to Yale University, and instead attended the university’s Sheffield Scientific School.

He began working for his father at the Great Northern Railway Company immediately after graduation and began pursuit of his own ultimately extremely successful investments in iron mining in northeastern Minnesota. While the eldest Hill son James had been groomed as their father’s successor, Louis’s capable management of a Great Northern extension over the Rockies in 1901 moved him into position as heir to the Hill business empire.

=== Marriage ===
In 1901, Louis married Maud Van Cortlandt Taylor (1870-1961), child of a distinguished Staten Island, New York family. The couple built a large home next door to his parents' home on Summit Avenue in St. Paul, Minnesota. They expanded the home in 1912, which then included a second floor ballroom with pipe organ, four large guest bedrooms on the first floor, and a swimming pool in the basement. They had four children: Louis Warren Jr., who served in the Minnesota Senate, (May 19, 1902 – April 6, 1995), Maud Van Cortlandt (June 1, 1903 – October 15, 1997), James Jerome II (March 2, 1905 – November 21, 1972; a documentary filmmaker), and Cortlandt Taylor (March 31, 1906 – March 21, 1978).

The family traveled the United States and the world and spent much of their time at North Oaks Farm, just north of St. Paul, where Louis built a chalet-style retreat. In 1910, Louis began purchasing orange groves in the Redlands, California and considerable acreage at Pebble Beach on the Monterey Peninsula, a development by the Pacific Improvement Company designed to attract the wealthy. The family enjoyed the mild Central California climate and often wintered there.

=== Death ===
Louis W. Hill died on April 27, 1948, in St. Paul. A service was held at the Cathedral of St. Paul, and he was buried in the Hill family section at Resurrection Cemetery in Mendota Heights, Minnesota.

== Work ==
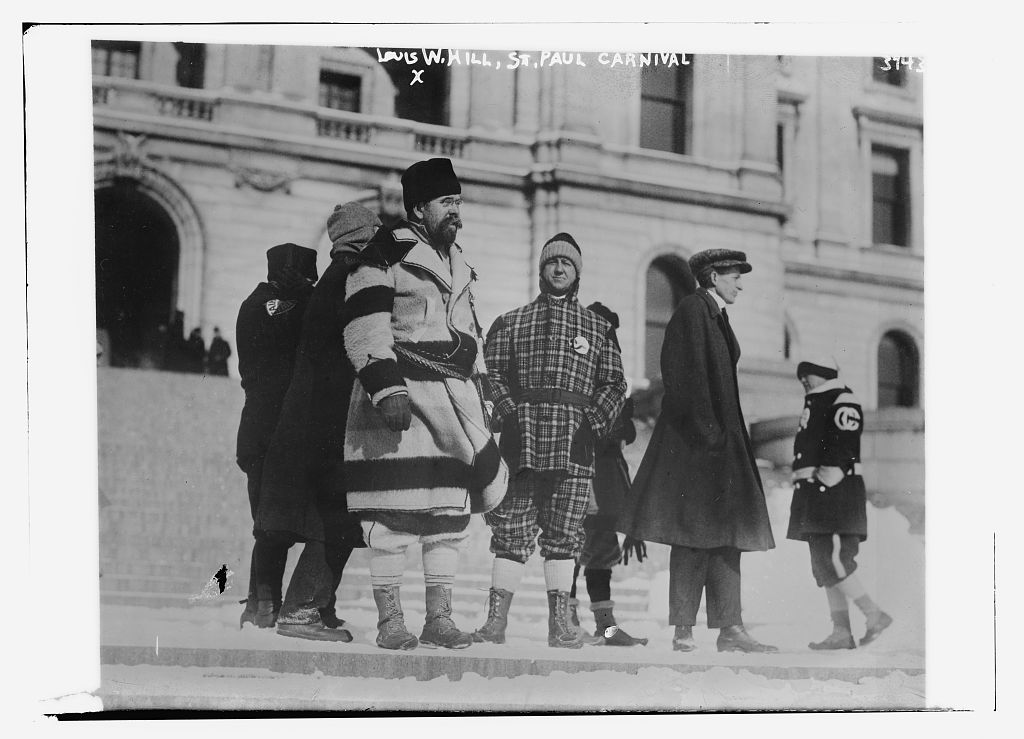
Hill (wearing a broad striped blanket coat) in a group watching the 1916 Saint Paul Winter Carnival parade from the steps of the Minnesota State Capitol in St. Paul, Minnesota

=== Great Northern Railway ===
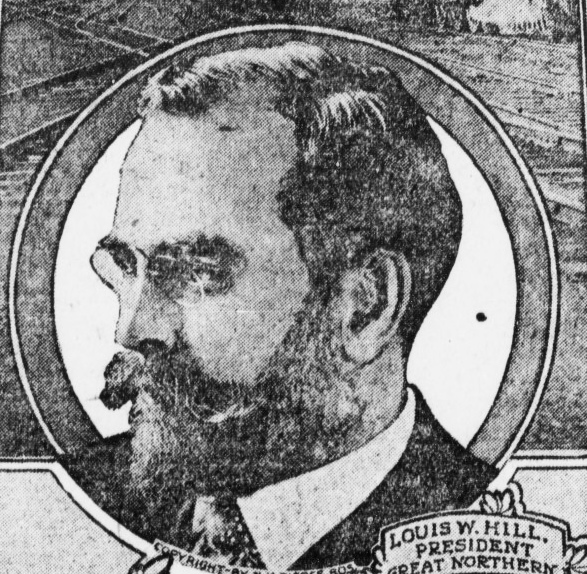
Louis Hill in 1908

During the first few years after completing his education, Louis studied Minnesota’s northern Mesabi Range where iron ore deposits had been found. He bought about 17,000 acres (6,900 ha) which proved to be extremely profitable when large scale mining began in 1906.

In the middle of the first decade after 1900, Louis took over management of the Great Northern Railway. He was named president in 1907 and board chairman in 1912, although his father James continued to retain much control until his death in 1916. Louis expanded his interests far beyond railroads: he was at the forefront of the oil and auto transport industries and was a major player in land development in Montana and California, in finance, and in copper mining.

=== Glacier National Park ===
One of Louis’ greatest legacies was his enthusiastic promotion of tourism and the national park system. He maintained an interest in the American Indian tribes of Montana and became a collector of Blackfoot material, now housed in the Science Museum of Minnesota. He is credited as a major contributor to creating lodging, trails, roads, and other tourist attractions near Glacier National Park in Montana. He founded the Many Glacier Company, which constructed and operated hotels, chalets, and other visitor facilities, including Glacier Park Hotel, located in East Glacier Park; Many Glacier Hotel, located in the Many Glacier Valley of Glacier National Park, near Babb, Montana; and the Prince of Wales hotel in Waterton Park, Alberta, Canada. He had a summer home built in Waterton by Doug Oland, one of the principal builders for the Prince of Wales Hotel. Neither he nor his family were ever known to occupy the residence. The home was completed in August 1928 and renamed Northland Lodge after it was acquired by Hugh Black and Earl and Bessie Hacking in 1948.

== Sources ==
Primary Sources

- Louis W. Hill Papers, Minnesota Historical Society. Accessed February 12, 2024.

Secondary Sources

- Bottomly-O'Looney, Jennifer and Deirdre Shaw. (Summer, 2010). "Glacier National Park: People, a Playground, and a Park", Montana The Magazine of Western History.
- Desch, Heidi (March 2, 2015), Louis Hill Left a Legacy in the Park, Hungry Horse News
- Djuff, Ray and Mike Morrison. (2001). Glacier's Historic Hotels & Chalets: View with a Room. Farcountry Press.
- Guthrie, C. W. (2008). Glacier National Park. The First 100 Years. Farcountry Press.
- Jamison, Michael (March 28, 2010), Parallel tracks: Glacier National Park born from Great Northern Railway, Missoulian
- The Historic Belton Chalet Built by the Great Northern Railway in 1910, archived from the original on August 2, 2008
- Young, Biloine W., and Eileen McCormack, The Dutiful Son: Louis W. Hill, Life in the Shadow of the Empire Builder, James J. Hill, St. Paul, MN, Ramsey County Historical Society, 2010; ISBN 978-0-934294-71-3
