= Enola Holmes (film series) =

2020 American film series

- Official logo
- Based on: The Enola Holmes Mysteries by Nancy Springer
- Starring: Millie Bobby Brown
- Cinematography: Giles Nuttgens; Matthew Lewis
- Edited by: Adam Bosman (2)
- Music by: Daniel Pemberton (2)
- Production companies: Legendary Entertainment; PCMA Productions
- Distributed by: Netflix
- Release dates: September 23, 2020 (1); November 4, 2022 (2); July 1, 2026 (3)
- Country: United States
- Language: English

Enola Holmes is an American mystery film series created by Harry Bradbeer and Philip Barantini that has been produced by PCMA Productions and Legendary Pictures in association with Netflix since 2020. The films, based on The Enola Holmes Mysteries novels by Nancy Springer, include Enola Holmes, Enola Holmes 2 and Enola Holmes 3.

The first two films are directed by Harry Bradbeer and the third film is directed by Philip Barantini. All films are screenplayed by Jack Thorne and star Millie Bobby Brown as Enola Holmes.

== Films ==
Film	U.S. release date	Director	Writer	Producers
Film	U.S. release date	Director	Screenplay by	Producers
Enola Holmes	September 23, 2020	Harry Bradbeer	Jack Thorne	Ali Mendes, Alex Garcia, Mary Parent, Paige Brown & Millie Bobby Brown
Enola Holmes 2	November 4, 2022	Harry Bradbeer	Jack Thorne	Ali Mendes, Alex Garcia, Mary Parent, Robert Brown & Millie Bobby Brown
Enola Holmes 3	July 1, 2026	Philip Barantini	Jack Thorne	Ali Mendes, Alex Garcia, Mary Parent & Millie Bobby Brown

=== Enola Holmes (2020) ===
A 2020 mystery film starring Millie Bobby Brown as the title character, the teenage sister of the already famous Victorian-era detective Sherlock Holmes. The film is directed by Harry Bradbeer from a screenplay by Jack Thorne that adapts the first novel in The Enola Holmes Mysteries series by Nancy Springer. In the film, Enola travels to London to find her missing mother but ends up on a thrilling adventure, pairing up with a runaway lord as they attempt to solve a mystery that threatens the entire country. In addition to Brown, the film also stars Sam Claflin, Henry Cavill, and Helena Bonham Carter.

=== Enola Holmes 2 (2022) ===
In September 2020, co-producer and star Millie Bobby Brown and director Harry Bradbeer acknowledged their intentions to develop a sequel to Enola Holmes. The story is an original story based on the real 1888 matchgirls' strike and the life of labour activist Sarah Chapman. Bradbeer thought it was an inspiring feminist tale, and it showed the theme of working together — "Enola, to advance, has to work with others and not just be reliant on herself. It's a story that goes from 'I' to 'we', and that is a story of sisterhood."

In May 2021, Enola Holmes 2 was in development, with Brown and Cavill reprising their roles.

Production and filming began in Autumn 2021. Scenes were filmed in Hull in October 2021, and Cavill wrapped filming that November. Filming concluded on January 7, 2022.

=== Enola Holmes 3 (2026) ===
Enola Holmes 3 is a 2026 mystery film and the sequel to the 2022 film Enola Holmes 2, which stars Millie Bobby Brown reprising her role as the title character, the sister of the famous Victorian-era detective Sherlock Holmes. The film also stars Louis Partridge, Himesh Patel, Sharon Duncan-Brewster, Henry Cavill, and Helena Bonham Carter in supporting roles. The film is directed by Philip Barantini--making this the first film in the series not directed by Harry Bradbeer. The script, written by Jack Thorne, is not based on any storyline from the book series The Enola Holmes Mysteries by Nancy Springer and is an original story. It follows Enola as she is in Malta about to be married to Tewkesbury, when Sherlock goes missing, leaving a mystery to be solved.

The film was released on July 1, 2026. The film received mixed reviews from critics.

== Main cast and characters ==
List indicators

This section includes characters who will appear or have appeared in more than two films in the series.

- An empty grey cell indicates the character was not in the film, or that the character's official presence has not yet been confirmed.
- ^{C} indicates a cameo role.
- ^{Y} indicates a younger version of the character.

Character	Films		
Character	Enola Holmes	Enola Holmes 2	Enola Holmes 3
Character	2020	2022	2026
Enola Holmes	Millie Bobby Brown Sofia Stavrinou^{Y}	Millie Bobby Brown Sofia Stavrinou^{Y}	Millie Bobby Brown
Sherlock Holmes	Henry Cavill	Henry Cavill John Parshall^{Y}	Henry Cavill
Eudoria Holmes	Helena Bonham Carter	Helena Bonham Carter	Helena Bonham Carter
Viscount Tewkesbury	Louis Partridge	Louis Partridge	Louis Partridge
Inspector Graydon Lestrade	Adeel Akhtar	Adeel Akhtar	
Edith	Susan Wokoma	Susan Wokoma	Susan Wokoma^{C}
Mycroft Holmes	Sam Claflin	Stefan Peterman^{Y}	Mentioned
Lady Tewkesbury	Hattie Morahan		Hattie Morahan
Dr. John Watson		Himesh Patel^{C}	Himesh Patel
Mira Troy		Sharon Duncan-Brewster	Sharon Duncan-Brewster

== Crew and details ==
Crew and details
Title	Editor	Cinematographer	Production companies	Distributing companies	Running time
Enola Holmes	Adam Bosman	Giles Nuttgens	PCMA Productions, Legendary Pictures	Netflix	2hrs 3 mins
Enola Holmes 2	Adam Bosman	Giles Nuttgens	PCMA Productions, Legendary Pictures	Netflix	2hrs 9 mins
Enola Holmes 3	Tommy Boulding	Matthew Lewis	PCMA Productions, Legendary Pictures	Netflix	1hr 45 mins

== Critical response ==
Film	Rotten Tomatoes	Metacritic
Enola Holmes	91% (208 reviews)	68 (31 reviews)
Enola Holmes 2	93% (105 reviews)	64 (26 reviews)
Enola Holmes 3	65% (78 reviews)	58% (17 reviews)

=== Enola Holmes (2020) ===
- Peter Debruge of Variety called the film an "entertaining franchise starter" and praised Brown's performance, stating that "[her] acting style recalls the effusive spontaneity Keira Knightley brought to Pride and Prejudice, shattering the straitlaced propriety of so many Jane Austen adaptations before it." Debruge found the film "more tasteful in its high-energy storytelling than Guy Ritchie's recent Sherlock Holmes movies, and considerably more fun than [2019]'s Nancy Drew reboot."
- John DeFore of The Hollywood Reporter gave the film a positive review and wrote: "It successfully imagines a place for its heroine in Holmes' world, then convinces young viewers that Enola needn't be constrained by that world's borders."
- Ann Hornaday of The Washington Post wrote: "Enola Holmes offers brisk and exuberant escape from the heaviness of modern times, with its leading actress lending her own appealing touches to the journey. When the game is afoot, she's more than capable, not just of keeping up, but winning the day."
- Ella Kemp of Empire magazine wrote: "Well-intentioned if sometimes lacking in subtlety, Enola Holmes offers a fine, spirited reminder that a traditional story can always be retold – although it might need more refined teachings on feminism next time."
- Peter Bradshaw of The Guardian gave a mixed review, saying: "It all rattles along amiably enough. Enola Holmes is the kind of all-star production that might once have been made by the BBC" but had some criticism for the mystery elements of the story "there should have been more specifically ingenious deducting and solving from Enola – codebreaking isn't the same thing."

=== Enola Holmes 2 (2022) ===
- Beandrea July of The New York Times wrote "One can't help but cheer on this Y.A. feminist tale as a welcome addition to the Sherlock Holmes universe."
- Lovia Gyarkye of The Hollywood Reporter called it "a serviceable sequel". Gyarkye praises the meticulous production and costume design but is critical of the narrative as "The 1888 match girl strike, which was a process of community building, a focused effort on we, gets repackaged as a lesson in one voice leading the masses."
- Benjamin Lee of The Guardian gave it 3 out of 5 and wrote: "An equally boisterous romp that's equally as hard to remember once it's over but one that should keep its many fans engaged enough to warrant further sequels."
- Robbie Collin of The Telegraph gave it 2 out of 5. He found the film less charming than its predecessor and was critical of "the overall aura of cheapness", from the dreary looking scenes to the basic fight scenes.

== Accolades ==
=== Enola Holmes ===
Awards and nominations received by Enola Holmes (2020).

Award	Date of ceremony	Category	Recipients	Result	Ref.
Kids' Choice Awards	March 13, 2021	Favorite Movie Actress	Millie Bobby Brown	Won	
Las Vegas Film Critics Society	March 5, 2021	Youth in Film - Female	Millie Bobby Brown	Won	
London Film Critics' Circle	February 7, 2021	Young British/Irish Performer of the Year	Millie Bobby Brown	Nominated	
Online Film & Television Association	April 4, 2021	Best Youth Performance	Millie Bobby Brown	Nominated	
Seattle Film Critics Society	February 15, 2021	Best Youth Performance	Millie Bobby Brown	Nominated	
Washington D.C. Area Film Critics Association	February 8, 2021	Best Youth Performance	Millie Bobby Brown	Nominated	
Saturn Awards	October 26, 2021	Best Film Presentation in Streaming Media	Enola Holmes	Won	

=== Enola Holmes 2 ===
Awards and nominations received by Enola Holmes 2 (2022).

Award	Date of ceremony	Category	Recipients	Result	Ref.
2023 Kids' Choice Awards	March 4, 2023	Favorite Movie Actress	Millie Bobby Brown	Won	
19th Irish Film & Television Awards	May 7, 2023	Best Costume Design	Consolata Boyle	Won	
