= Enola Holmes =

Enola Holmes may refer to:

- Enola Holmes (character), a non-canonical younger sister of Sherlock Holmes created by author Nancy Springer
- The Enola Holmes Mysteries, the book series featuring the character
- Enola Holmes (film series) based on the books:
  - Enola Holmes (film), a 2020 film based on the first book
    - Enola Holmes (soundtrack)
  - Enola Holmes 2, the 2022 sequel to the 2020 film
    - Enola Holmes 2 (soundtrack)
  - Enola Holmes 3, the sequel to the 2022 film
