= Enola Holmes 2 (soundtrack) =

Enola Holmes 2 (Music from the Netflix Film)

Film score by Daniel Pemberton
- Released: November 4, 2022
- Recorded: 2022
- Studio: Abbey Road Studios
- Genre: Film score
- Length: 1:04:04
- Label: Milan
- Producer: Daniel Pemberton

Daniel Pemberton chronology
Amsterdam (2022)	Enola Holmes 2 (Music from the Netflix Film) (2022)	Spider-Man: Across the Spider-Verse (2023)

Singles from Enola Holmes 2 (Music from the Netflix Film)
- 1. "The Enola Holmes Detective Agency" Released: November 1, 2022

Enola Holmes 2 (Music from the Netflix Film) is the score album to the 2022 mystery film Enola Holmes 2, directed by Harry Bradbeer, which is a sequel to Enola Holmes (2020). Daniel Pemberton, the original composer, returned to score for the sequel. Pemberton described the score as "bigger than the first film", due to the expansion of the creative journey and the lead actor's adventures. The album was released on November 4, 2022, by Milan Records.

== Development ==
Composer Daniel Pemberton was revealed to be a part of Enola Holmes 2 in March 2022, who described the score feels more "grown up in the second outing", where unlike the first film, Enola finds herself immersed in an environment that has more danger and darkness to it, and added "There's more at stake, the threats are bigger. The adventure is bigger. So the score has to change in line with that." The main theme was incorporated throughout the score, in various sounds and motifs, to "represent the investigation, the mystery and the adventures she finds herself in". Pemberton used multiple instruments for the theme, including accordions, double bass, honkytonk pianos, mandolins, orchestra and bits of sandpaper.

Pemberton acknowledged that the score is packed with a number of thematic ideas, which give clues and hints as the rest of the film. Pemberton added "We have a bunch of themes for Enola from the first film, as well as those for her mother and of course Tewkesbury. Without giving too much away it's fun to develop the Tewkesbury themes into something even bigger in this one. Then we have a new theme which we all call "The Merry Dance" which is an integral part and clue of Sherlock's case. There is a theme for Sarah and some other characters but if I even talk about them I will start giving story beats away so I must shut my mouth! But like many of the clues in the film lots of the music is also interlinked - pieces combine, motifs develop and reveal certain things as the story progresses.. they are a puzzle into themselves!"

He also used some of props for the score, which includes matchboxes from the factory were found in the edit, during their first meet with Bradbeer and editor Adam Bosman. Pemberton used those into the score, as they make "great nose" and produce "good shaker rhythms that are dotted all over the place". Besides composing, he also makes a brief cameo as a drunken conductor.

== Release ==
The soundtrack was officially announced by Milan Records on October 25, 2022, with the album being set for release on November 4, alongside the film. A single from the film "The Enola Holmes Detective Agency" was released on November 1, three days before the album release. A review from Collider, wrote "the track evokes a sort of big, brassy bombast almost reminiscent of the Pirates of the Caribbean soundtrack, the perfect tune to set the tone for the adventure to come for the plucky teenage detective".

== Reception ==
Laura Sirikul of Empire called it as a "jaunty" score, while The Playlist's Rodrigo Perez called the score as "outstanding". Patrick Gibbs of Slug Magazine opined that the score "keeps the rousing sense of suspense, adventure and unbridled fun going full force from the first frame to the last". Critic based on Nerds & Beyond called Pemberton's score as one of the "favorite creative aspects of the film" adding "There were several moments throughout the sequel that the combination of what I was seeing with what I was hearing from Pemberton's beautiful music gave me goosebumps." Kevin Harley of GamesRadar+ wrote that Pemberton's "typically nimble score handles the tonal swerves nicely". Gisanne Sophia of Marvelous Geeks Media wrote "the Enola Holmes 2 original score, much like the initial release, brings something so effortlessly lively to the musical world. The sounds are adventurous, distinct, and so tastefully done to create something profoundly memorable. The films are as appealing because the soundtrack goes hand-in-hand with creating a marvelous, enjoyable gem to watch despite the heavy topics the cases bring to the surface."

Filmtracks.com wrote "Altogether, the themes for Enola Holmes 2 represent an interesting extension of everything heard in the first score but without some of the expected applications. The fact that some of the massively tonal choral highlights of this score's second half don't make use of clearly delineated themes is disappointing. The character of Pemberton's instrumentation and rhythmic choices are more than enough to suffice to keep the work consistent, though. He continues to provide a unique spirit for this concept's music that balances period expectations with quirky enthusiasm, and while some listeners may not appreciate the prancing waltz movements that sometimes result, the whole functions. It may not be as strong or refreshingly appealing as Enola Holmes on album, but the sequel retains enough of the same personality and themes to merit a recommendation."

== Track listing ==
No.	Title	Length
1.	"Stop That Girl!"	1:44
2.	"The Enola Holmes Detective Agency"	2:26
3.	"Find Your Path"	1:34
4.	"To Shadwell"	0:56
5.	"Lyon's Match Factory"	2:06
6.	"The Merry Dance"	1:44
7.	"221b Baker Street"	1:15
8.	"A Loose Thread"	1:06
9.	"Mysterious Follower"	1:30
10.	"The Game Has Found Its Feet (Again)"	1:04
11.	"Bell Lane, Whitechapel"	2:04
12.	"The Threads Intertwine"	2:33
13.	"Le Langage de la Danse"	1:23
14.	"Dancing Lessons"	2:11
15.	"Chaperone Waltz"	1:55
16.	"Quite a Party"	0:54
17.	"The Last Dance"	2:03
18.	"Deductions"	3:58
19.	"Carriage Escape"	2:48
20.	"Grail On Horseback"	1:25
21.	"Sweet William"	2:37
22.	"Blackmail"	1:54
23.	"Enola and Tewkesbury"	1:31
24.	"The Truth of the Gods"	2:44
25.	"Stage Fight"	5:21
26.	"The Curtain Falls"	5:34
27.	"Up in Flames"	0:55
28.	"The Only Power We Have"	3:46
29.	"Enola Holmes (One Flame to Start a Fire)"	3:03
Total length:		64:04

== Credits ==
Credits adapted from CD liner notes

- Music composed and produced by – Daniel Pemberton
- Orchestra conductor – Matt Dunkley
- Choir conductor – Bob Johnston
- Orchestra contractor – Garreth Griffiths
- Orchestra – Chamber Orchestra of London and RSVP Voices
- Orchestration – Matt Dunkley, Mark Baechle
- Recording – Sam Okell, Andrew Dudman
- Mixing – Sam Okell
- Music editor – Ben Smithers
- Assistant engineers – Andy Maxwell, Christopher Parker
- Music preparation – Jill Streater & Ann Barnard, Global Music Services
- Musical assistance – Alex Gruz
