= Amsterdam (soundtrack) =

Amsterdam (Original Motion Picture Soundtrack)

Soundtrack album by Daniel Pemberton
- Released: October 7, 2022
- Recorded: 2022
- Genre: Film score; film soundtrack
- Length: 99:27
- Label: Hollywood
- Producer: Daniel Pemberton

Daniel Pemberton chronology
See How They Run (2022)	Amsterdam (2022)	Enola Holmes 2 (2025)

Singles from Amsterdam (Original Motion Picture Soundtrack)
- 1. "Time" Released: September 23, 2022

Amsterdam (Original Motion Picture Soundtrack) is the soundtrack album for the 2022 film Amsterdam directed by David O. Russell and starring Christian Bale, Margot Robbie and John David Washington. The soundtrack consists of 47 tracks, featuring an original score composed by Daniel Pemberton and a selection of classical and period songs. An original song "Time", performed by Drake and Giveon, was released as a single on September 23, 2022, while the soundtrack was released through Hollywood Records on October 7, the same day as the film's release.

== Development ==
Hildur Guðnadóttir was originally announced as the film's composer in November 2020, but was reportedly replaced by Daniel Pemberton in August 2022. As Pemberton joined the film late in production, the team had already experimented with some preliminary music, which Pemberton said did not work due to the film's complex narrative. He noted that his late entry ultimately helped him shape the final soundscape, as he was able to view the completed picture before composing.

After watching the film, Pemberton chose to use woodwinds to craft the score. As the film weaves together different stories of comedic elements, romance, friendship, suspense and mystery, he felt the use of woodwinds rather than a regular orchestral score worked, as it had a lightness and optimism that better suited the tone. He began writing the score in the

Pemberton collaborated with rappers Drake and Giveon for an original song, titled "Time". He recalled that Drake, one of the film's producers, was closely involved with his childhood friend Matt Budman. Inspired by a line of dialogue from Robbie that summarized the film's plot, Pemberton discussed the idea of writing an original song, and Budman recommended Giveon. The song was composed in a quick succession.

== Release ==
The original song "Time" was released as a single on September 23, 2022. The soundtrack was released by Hollywood Records on October 7, the same day as the film's release.

== Reception ==
James Southall of Movie Wave wrote "Daniel Pemberton is an exciting film composer", and called Amsterdam "one of his most impressive [works] so far". Ian Freer of Empire wrote "It is also a delight to listen to, with Daniel Pemberton’s score adding lightness and much-needed urgency, mainly through woodwind action."

David Rooney of The Hollywood Reporter wrote "a mercurial divide mirrored in Daniel Pemberton’s score, which veers between high intrigue and whimsy." James Mottram of NME wrote that "Daniel Pemberton’s score delicately [waltzes]" with the voiceover narration. Chris Bumbray of JoBlo.com wrote "the score by Daniel Pemberton is terrific." Pete Hammond of Deadline Hollywood wrote of "a wonderful, pitch-perfect score from Daniel Pemberton." Justin Chang of Los Angeles Times called it an "airily charming score." Mark Feeney of The Boston Globe called it an "excellent score".

== Track listing ==
No.	Title	Artist(s)	Length
1.	"Amsterdam" (Opening)		1:57
2.	"Choice, Not Need" (True Love)		1:50
3.	"I Want to See You Happy"		1:05
4.	"Something Suspicious"		3:11
5.	"Into the Truck"		0:48
6.	"Stockade, France 1918"		1:38
7.	"Triage"		2:10
8.	"The French Lady"		2:24
9.	"Welcome To My World"		2:20
10.	"The Good Part" (Amsterdam)		2:22
11.	"Don't Go" (True Love)		1:36
12.	"Pink Medicine"		0:56
13.	"The Pact/The Murder"		2:26
14.	"Try to Be Optimistic"		2:18
15.	"Fit the Description"		1:43
16.	"Stay Alive"		1:34
17.	"Valerie"		2:09
18.	"Carlton Knockout"		2:40
19.	"I Never Thought of Anyone Else"		1:00
20.	"The Sacred Rules of Birding"		1:49
21.	"It Advances with Age"		1:53
22.	"Worse Loneliness" (True Love)		1:37
23.	"Claret and Tea"		1:36
24.	"The Great Nation Society Clinic"		1:14
25.	"Committee of the Five"		2:12
26.	"The General Wants to Meet You"		2:34
27.	"Money for a Speech"		1:45
28.	"Conspiracy"		1:51
29.	"Modern Art"		1:00
30.	"Cuckoo Is in the Nest"		2:21
31.	"Gala Socialising"		1:10
32.	"I've Waited Too Long" (True Love)		1:33
33.	"Meet the Committee"		3:31
34.	"Eyedrops"		0:59
35.	"The Walrus Bag"		3:00
36.	"Gala Speech"		2:31
37.	"The Killer Is Here"		2:02
38.	"Accusations and Charges"		3:12
39.	"Powerful People"		2:10
40.	"Amsterdam" (Ending)		5:26
41.	"Time"	Drake; Giveon	3:42
42.	"Le Soleil Rouge"	Christian Bale; John David Washington; Margot Robbie	0:57
43.	"Doucement, Doucement"	Luc Kleiner	2:34
44.	"Dinah"	Reunion Gala Band	2:46
45.	"Peanut Vendor"	Christian Bale; Mel Fair; Vaughn W. Page	2:44
46.	"Fado Português"	Mariana Bandhold	2:01
47.	"Lady of Spain"	Floyd Armstrong; Leonard A. Tucker Jr.	3:10
Total length:			99:27

== Accolades ==
Award	Date of ceremony	Category	Recipient(s) and nominee(s)	Result	Ref.
Hollywood Music in Media Awards	November 16, 2022	Original Song – Feature Film	"Time" – written by Aubrey Drake Graham, Daniel Pemberton, Giveon Evans, and Jahaan Akil Sweet; performed by Giveon	Nominated	
International Film Music Critics Association	February 23, 2023	Best Original Score for a Drama Film	Daniel Pemberton	Nominated	
World Soundtrack Awards	October 21, 2023	Film Composer of the Year	Daniel Pemberton (Note: also for Enola Holmes 2, See How They Run (both 2022) and Spider-Man: Across the Spider-Verse (2023))	Nominated	
