= See How They Run (soundtrack) =

See How They Run (Original Motion Picture Soundtrack)

Film score by Daniel Pemberton
- Released: 16 September 2022
- Recorded: 2022
- Studio: Abbey Road Studios, London
- Genre: Film score
- Length: 65:07
- Label: Hollywood
- Producer: Daniel Pemberton

Daniel Pemberton chronology
| Brian and Charles (2022) | See How They Run (2022) | Amsterdam (2025) |

See How They Run (Original Motion Picture Soundtrack) is the film score to the 2022 film See How They Run, directed by Tom George, and starring Saoirse Ronan, Sam Rockwell, Adrien Brody, Ruth Wilson, Reece Shearsmith, Harris Dickinson, and David Oyelowo. The film score is composed by Daniel Pemberton and was released through Hollywood Records on 16 September 2022.

== Background ==
In June 2022, it was announced that Daniel Pemberton would compose the film score for See How They Run. In an interaction with Edith Bowman, Pemberton said that he used vintage banjos, unconventional drum textures and old pianos used by Mrs Mills, to represent the whodunit types of sounds from 1950s. The score was recorded at the Abbey Road Studios in London and performed by the London Chamber Orchestra.

== Release ==
The score was released through Hollywood Records on 16 September 2022.

== Reception ==
David Rooney of The Hollywood Reporter wrote the score "swerves between jauntiness and intrigue". Amy Nicholson of Variety wrote "composer Daniel Pemberton unleashes a jazzy upright bass to climb up and down the scales". Tim Grierson of Screen International wrote "Daniel Pemberton's jaunty score only further establishing the knowing unreality of the proceedings." Chris Connor of Flickering Myth wrote "Daniel Pemberton's jazz infused score helps drive the action".

Patrick Cremona of Radio Times called it a "lively" score, while Kevin Maher of The Times wrote "The soundtrack from Daniel Pemberton is, for instance, conspicuously 'jazzy' and clatters and hoots away relentlessly as if to remind us, 'Fun! This is fun! Listen to the music! It's fun!'" Gissane Sophia of Lady Geeks Media wrote "Pemberton closes the case shut with the See How They Run soundtrack, and if you're also fond of listening to such genre scores in the autumn, now's the best time to do so."

== Track listing ==
| No. | Title | Length |
|---|---|---|
| 1. | "A Lavish Affair" | 5:48 |
| 2. | "Bumped Off" | 1:58 |
| 3. | "Stalker and Stoppard" | 1:36 |
| 4. | "A Crime Scene" | 1:57 |
| 5. | "Potential Victims" | 1:29 |
| 6. | "Investigation Day 1" | 1:06 |
| 7. | "Commissioner, Inspector, Constable" | 1:18 |
| 8. | "A Room at the Savoy" | 1:02 |
| 9. | "Three Weeks Later" | 2:04 |
| 10. | "Storyboard Shootout" | 1:19 |
| 11. | "Tell a Lie" | 0:48 |
| 12. | "Shepperton Studios" | 2:33 |
| 13. | "Keep Your Eyes Peeled" | 2:40 |
| 14. | "Woolf's Office" | 1:02 |
| 15. | "A Suspicious Hat" | 0:44 |
| 16. | "Silver Tongue" | 1:04 |
| 17. | "Audition Line Up" | 1:28 |
| 18. | "Mister Mover" | 2:28 |
| 19. | "The Tarot Cards" | 1:33 |
| 20. | "Platonic" | 1:03 |
| 21. | "Stalker Suspects" | 1:05 |
| 22. | "Bakewell's Biscuits" | 0:49 |
| 23. | "A Night at the Theatre" | 2:15 |
| 24. | "Murder at the Mousetrap" | 4:46 |
| 25. | "A Drink in the Woods" | 2:03 |
| 26. | "A Private Conversation, Betrayed" | 2:19 |
| 27. | "Arrival at Agatha's" | 1:14 |
| 28. | "Full House" | 3:21 |
| 29. | "A Bit of an Over Reaction" | 1:12 |
| 30. | "Reveal with a Rifle" | 2:18 |
| 31. | "Chase to Winterbrook House" | 1:28 |
| 32. | "Owed an Apology" | 0:49 |
| 33. | "A Shootout..." | 2:29 |
| 34. | "...And a Big Explosion" | 1:45 |
| 35. | "See How They Run" | 2:14 |
| Total length: | | 65:07 |

== Accolades ==
| Award | Date of ceremony | Category | Recipient(s) and nominee(s) | Result | Ref. |
|---|---|---|---|---|---|
| World Soundtrack Awards | October 21, 2023 | Film Composer of the Year | Daniel Pemberton (Note: also for Enola Holmes 2, Amsterdam (both 2022) and Spider-Man: Across the Spider-Verse (2023)) | Nominated | |
