= That Summer Day =

- Directed by: Jon East
- Written by: Clive Bradley
- Produced by: Hannah Pescod
- Starring: Sanchez Adams; Rhea Karimpanal; Michael Curtis Parsons; Susie Wokoma; Perry Millward; Rosie Mahoney
- Edited by: Steve Singleton
- Distributed by: BBC television
- Release date: 7 July 2006
- Running time: 60 minutes
- Country: United Kingdom
- Language: English

That Summer Day is a one-hour docudrama that provides a fictional account of the lives of six children on the day of the bombings of the London public transport system on 7 July 2005. It was directed by Jon East, written by Clive Bradley (who also wrote Last Rights), produced by Hannah Pescod and executive produced by Jon East and Mark Redhead. The drama combines fictional elements and archive footage from television and radio to document the effect the events had on the children. The programme's creation is the result from the correspondence the CBBC website received following the events, from children struggling to come to terms with it. In the early development of the show, the creators visited schools and people from charities like ChildLine, who had talked to children about the subject, to find out which themes and issues the programme needed to address to properly respond to the questions raised by children. The programme was filmed on location in London and at Islington Green School. Several of its students were extras during filming.

In the press release announcing the programme, executive producer Mark Redhead said:

We aimed to make a film that would go a small way towards making sense of the events and to explore themes about racial and religious tension, loss and fear, as well as highlighting positives like love, family and friendship.

The racial tensions described becomes apparent when the Muslim character Ayesha is not allowed on the bus by the bus driver because Islamic extremists are suspected to be involved in the attack. Another character, Ben, goes to find his father who travels through one of the affected stations, Liverpool Street tube station, on a daily basis.

The programme was broadcast on BBC Two exactly a year after the events it was based on at 16:30 local time. The programme was repeated on the second anniversary of the bombings on the CBBC Channel at 17:00 local time, and in 2010 on BBC Two. On 25 November 2007 the programme was awarded a Children's BAFTA in the category Best Drama.

== Plot ==
In the morning Jack Brodie, a judo brown belt who just moved to London from Cleethorpes, learns London has won the bid to host the 2012 Olympics. Unfortunately, his mood and his first day at his new school are quickly ruined when he learns the London Underground has been bombed. His new-found friend Ben leaves school property in search of his father who may be at one of the attacked stations. Jack follows him.

As soon as the school staff learn about the attacks through a phone call from a concerned parent, the trip to a music competition is immediately cancelled and the music teacher convinces the students to practice in the music room until they can leave. Muslim Bass Guitar player Ayesha has been the focus of bully Kelly Davies since the start of the day when she accidentally bumped into her and made her drop her mobile phone. Kelly and her friend Marie start to taunt Ayesha and her friend Mike, saying that they are an item. This culminates in Kelly stealing Ayesha's brand new mobile phone. She warns her not to tell anyone or she will be 'sorrier than she can dream'. However, Mike tells their teacher and gets Kelly punished. Ayesha is angry with him for the rest of the day and only forgives him when they are on their way home.

Kelly turns on Marie when she shows remorse for joining her in bullying Ayesha and throws her book out of the window.

Jack and Ben are still intent on finding Liverpool Street station where Ben's dad works. When they enter a shop to ask for directions, a man agrees to take them there. When he attempts to mug Ben, Jack uses his judo skills to trip him up and the two boys run for their lives.

The entire class is waiting for the bus, but upon seeing Ayesha and her sister Jamilla, the driver makes a comment about not having their jihad on his bus, closes the doors and drives off, leaving most of the kids out on the street. Kelly starts picking on Ayesha again, until Marie finally snaps at her telling her how stupid she is. Kelly turns away and walks home angrily. Ayesha, Mike and Jamilia walk the other way, discussing the mad and bitter bus driver.

Ben eventually finds his dad, who is covered in patches of soot and blood stains; he was travelling on one of the bombed underground trains and was one carriage down from the explosion. He is still in shock from what he has observed and most of his clothes are damaged by fire and shrapnel. He stops at a café and tells them he had to make a statement due to being so close to bomb. The carnage and devastation he had been made to see of those dying, dead and mutilated prove too much and he breaks down in tears as Ben and Jack look on taken aback of seeing Ben's dad crying. Eventually Ben, his dad and Jack go back to their homes. Jack's mum walks into her son's room to see him tearing up a newspaper with the Olympic rings on them and says that London will not always be like this. Jack sticks the picture on the wall and says that he thinks he is going to like it here.

== Cast ==
Actor	Role
Sanchez Adams	Ben
Rhea Karimpanal	Ayesha
Michael Curtis Parsons	Jack
Susie Wokoma	Marie
Perry Millward	Mike
Rosie Mahoney	Kelly
Bob Goody	Art teacher
