= Year of the Rabbit (TV series) =

British sitcom

- Episode 1 title card
- Genre: Sitcom; Black comedy; Buddy cop
- Created by: Kevin Cecil; Andy Riley
- Written by: Kevin Cecil; Andy Riley
- Directed by: Ben Taylor
- Starring: Matt Berry; Alun Armstrong; Freddie Fox; Susan Wokoma; Paul Kaye; Ann Mitchell; Keeley Hawes
- Composers: Nick Foster; Oli Julian
- Country of origin: United Kingdom
- Original language: English
- No. of series: 1
- No. of episodes: 6

Production
- Executive producers: Ben Farrell; Toby Stevens; Matt Berry; Kevin Cecil; Andy Riley
- Producer: Hannah Mackay
- Cinematography: Daniel Stafford-Clark
- Editor: Phil Hignett
- Running time: 25 mins approx.
- Production company: Objective Fiction

Original release
- Network: Channel 4 (U.K.); IFC (U.S.)
- Release: 10 June – 15 July 2019

Year of the Rabbit is a British television sitcom, created by Kevin Cecil and Andy Riley, that began broadcasting on Channel 4 on 10 June 2019.

Set in London in 1887, the series follows "a group of Victorian detectives including Detective Inspector Rabbit, a hardened booze-hound who's seen it all, and his new, hapless, by-the-books partner. While investigating a local murder, the chief of police's lewd but insightful adopted daughter becomes the country's first female officer. Together, the trio must fight crime while rubbing shoulders with street gangs, crooked politicians, Bulgarian princes, spiritualists, music hall stars, and the Elephant Man."

== Cast ==
=== Main ===
- Matt Berry as Detective Inspector Eli Rabbit; a seasoned investigator
- Alun Armstrong as Chief Inspector Hugh Wisbech; Rabbit's senior officer
- Freddie Fox as Detective Sergeant Wilbur Strauss; Rabbit's junior partner
- Susan Wokoma as Sergeant Mabel Wisbech; Britain's first female police officer and Chief Inspector Wisbech's adopted daughter
- Paul Kaye as Detective Inspector Tanner; Rabbit's arch-enemy
- Ann Mitchell as Gwendoline; landlady of the Bar of Gold
- Keeley Hawes as Lydia; leader of The Vision, a secret women's organisation

=== Recurring ===
- David Dawson as Joseph Merrick
- Alistair Petrie as George Larkham
- Peter-Hugo Daly as Murky John
- Amer Chadha-Patel as Detective Sergeant Keith
- Sally Phillips as Princess Juliana of Bulgaria
- Jill Halfpenny as Flora Wilson

== Episodes ==
No.	Title	Directed by	Written by	Original release date	UK viewers (millions)
1	"Pilot"	Ben Taylor	Kevin Cecil & Andy Riley	10 June 2019	N/A
A murderer targeting young girls in the dead of night is the latest target for Detective Inspector Rabbit and his team, but with his arch-rival Tanner watching his every move, Rabbit is forced to think tactically to catch the culprit.
2	"Brick Man"	Ben Taylor	Kevin Cecil & Andy Riley	17 June 2019	N/A
Tanner falls victim to a homemade bomb seemingly meant for Rabbit. A mythical creature from London folklore, the 'Brick Man', has seemingly returned to terrorise the citizens of the East End. Rabbit suspects a high-ranking public official of being the culprit.
3	"Gangs"	Ben Taylor	Kevin Cecil & Andy Riley	24 June 2019	N/A
Strauss and Mabel are sent undercover as members of rival London gangs when warfare erupts on the streets of the East End, while Rabbit investigates a series of mysterious deaths in an old folks' home.
4	"Sniper"	Ben Taylor	Kevin Cecil & Andy Riley	1 July 2019	N/A
Rabbit and his team are tasked with providing close protection to Prince Hector of Bulgaria - but are caught up in the pursuit of an armed sniper with a deadly aim. Rabbit catches up with his former flame, Flora, whom he suspects may be the killer.
5	"Hostage"	Ben Taylor	Kevin Cecil & Andy Riley	8 July 2019	N/A
Rabbit plans to save Flora from the gallows, but is held up by an armed siege at a match factory, where a dozen girls are being held hostage by a crazed maniac with a canister of poison gas.
6	"Framed Rabbit"	Ben Taylor	Kevin Cecil & Andy Riley	15 July 2019	N/A
Rabbit has been framed for murder. His only option is go underground and seek the help of Murky John to avoid being arrested and taken to the gallows. Strauss and Mabel set about proving Rabbit's innocence, despite him having since become the most wanted man in London.

== Production ==
=== Development ===
On 9 October 2017, it was announced that Channel 4 had given the production a pilot order, with the episode set to be written by Andy Riley and Kevin Cecil.

On 7 June 2018, it was announced that the production had been given a series order, for a first series consisting of six episodes and that American television network IFC had joined the project as a co-producer. It was further announced that Matt Berry would serve as an additional writer and that the series would be directed by Ben Taylor. Production companies involved with the series were slated to consist of Objective Fiction with All3Media International handling distribution. On 29 January 2019, it was reported that Ben Farrell and Toby Stevens would serve as executive producers and Hannah Mackay as a producer.

Production visited the Chatham Historic Dockyard in Kent for some of the filming of the series, where exterior street scenes were filmed and the interior of the Tarred Yarn Store.

=== Casting ===
Alongside the pilot order announcement, it was confirmed that Matt Berry, Freddie Fox, and Susan Wokoma would star in the series. On 29 January 2019, it was announced that Keeley Hawes, Sally Phillips, Jill Halfpenny, David Dawson, Ann Mitchell, Alistair Petrie, Matthew Holness, and Craig Parkinson would also appear. On 6 June 2019, it was announced that Taika Waititi would be making a cameo appearance.

== Broadcast and release ==
As well as being broadcast weekly at 10:00pm on Mondays, the entire first series was also made available as a box-set on All 4 from 10 June 2019. Outside of the United Kingdom, the series was broadcast on IFC in the United States—beginning 19 February 2020. In the autumn of 2019, the series was heavily promoted as part of the range of programming on Virgin Atlantic's onboard entertainment service Vera.

On February 11, 2020, the programme was renewed for a second series of six episodes. However, Channel 4 pulled out of funding the series in January 2021 due to budgetary concerns brought by the COVID-19 pandemic, with production company Objective Media Group said to be "on the hunt for a new partner for the comedy" as a result.

== Reception ==
On Rotten Tomatoes, the series has a score of 94%, based on 18 reviews, with an average rating of 7.4/10. The site's critical consensus reads: "Carried by series leads Matt Berry and Susan Wokoma, Year of the Rabbit is a superbly silly and delightfully subversive period piece." On Metacritic, the series has a score of 69 out of 100, based on reviews from 6 critics, indicating "generally favorable reviews".

Tim Dowling of The Guardian found the series uneven saying it "is too arch to seat itself in the period, but neither is it a full-on parody of costume drama. It veers jarringly from silly to gruesome and back – childish gags, adult violence." IndieWire gave the series a B+ and said it was "a chance to see some very gifted performers add a goofy curveball to the London of centuries past." The A.V. Club gave it a B rating and said "You'll probably find it very, very funny."

Den of Geek named it one of "The Best British Crime Comedy TV Series".
