= Himesh Patel =

British actor (born 1990)

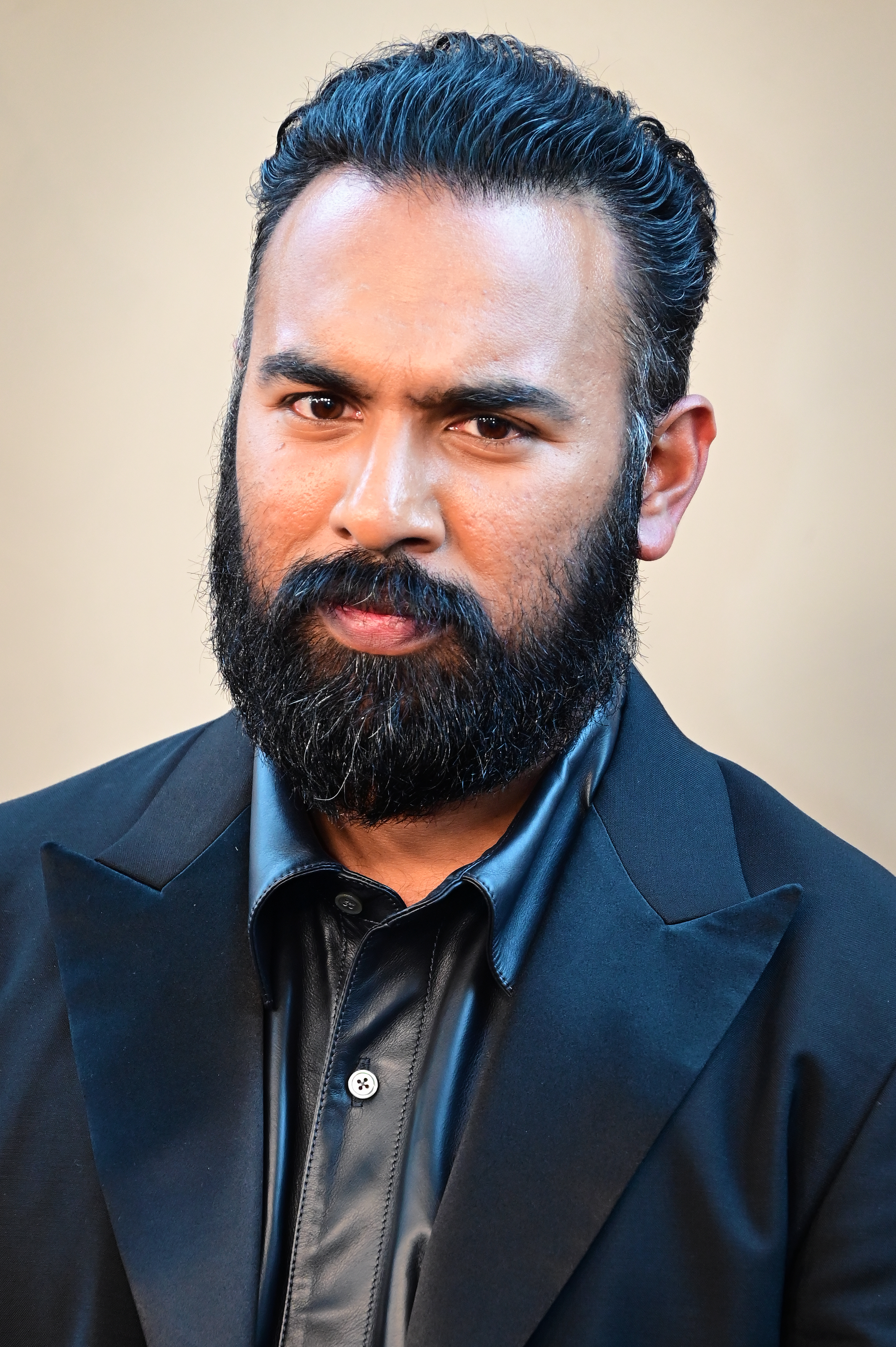
- Patel in 2026
- Born: Himesh Jitendra Patel; 13 October 1990 (age 36); Sawtry, Cambridgeshire, England
- Occupation: Actor
- Years active: 2007–present
- Children: 1

Himesh Jitendra Patel (born 13 October 1990) is a British actor. He began his career portraying Tamwar Masood in the BBC soap opera EastEnders (2007–2016). This was followed by roles in the Channel 4 sitcom Damned (2016–2018) and the HBO miniseries Station Eleven (2021), earning a nomination for the Primetime Emmy Award for Outstanding Lead Actor in a Limited Series or Movie for the latter.

Patel has also starred in the comedies Yesterday (2019), Don't Look Up (2021) and Greedy People (2024), and featured in Christopher Nolan's action movies Tenet (2020) and The Odyssey (2026).

== Early life ==
Patel was born in Sawtry, Cambridgeshire. His parents are both Indian Gujarati Hindus. His mother was born in Zambia and his father was born in Kenya. He grew up speaking Gujarati and English.

Patel attended Prince William School in Oundle, Northamptonshire. As a child, he began impersonating his favourite characters on television and film. When he was 11, he was cast in a school play, This Is Your Life, Santa Claus, as Michael Aspel. Upon the suggestion by a teacher, his parents then signed him up for a local theatre group, the Key Youth Theatre in Peterborough. Later, he became a member of The Young Actors' Company in Cambridge, where he also took film classes. He took piano lessons and bought himself an electric guitar that he taught himself to play at age 13.

His parents ran a newsagent's shop in Cambridgeshire. Patel did a paper round until he was 21.

== Career ==
=== EastEnders ===
When he was 16, Patel received a call on the day of his General Certificate of Secondary Education (GCSE) exams that notified he had landed an audition for the British soap opera EastEnders through an agency in The Young Actors' Company. He finished his last exam and had his parents rush him to his audition. After his first audition a casting assistant saw him waiting outside the audition room and asked him to read for the casting director. Patel won the part of Tamwar Masood, and 1 October 2007 marked his first appearance on EastEnders. In 2011 Patel and Meryl Fernandes won the Inside Soap Award for Best Wedding.

Patel has also appeared in EastEnders: E20 as Tamwar. In 2011 he co-wrote episode one of series three with co-star Charlie G. Hawkins. In 2013 he filmed an internet spin-off of EastEnders called Tamwar Tales – The Life of an Assistant Market Inspector. Four episodes were aired weekly, starting on 25 July 2013. All four episodes and one behind-the-scenes clip are available on the EastEnders official website.

He played Tamwar for nine years until he left the show in 2016 to explore other opportunities. His last appearance was on 22 April 2016.

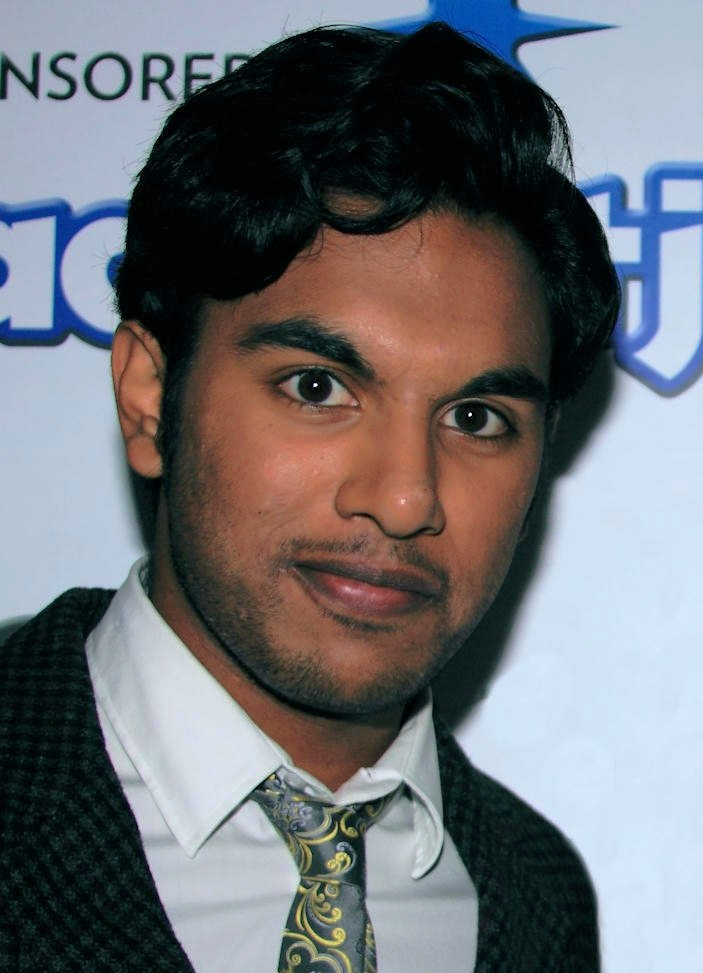
Patel in 2011

=== Short films ===
He has appeared in a number of short films. In 2014, he was cast as Pavan in the short film Two Dosas; the film won several awards, including Best Short Comedy at the London Short Film Festival and Best Comedy at the Aspen Film Festival. At the Shuffle festival, it won a third award, judged by Danny Boyle, who would later direct Patel in Yesterday (2019).

Patel portrayed The Suit in The Fox (2017), another comedy short by Henry Scriven.

He appeared as Hapinder in the 2019 short film Is This Life?.

In 2021, he acted in the short film Enjoy.

=== After EastEnders ===
On 27 September 2016 he made his first appearance on TV since leaving EastEnders in the first episode of the Channel 4 sitcom Damned. He played ex-constable and social worker Nitin for 12 episodes in two six-episode series. He appeared in Rapscallions (2016), a short film by Henry Scriven.

In 2017 he was cast in Don Juan in Soho as "Vagabond" with David Tennant playing the titular character. Patel played Amit in an episode of the BBC comedy Climaxed in the same year. He made a short appearance as Mr. Glencuddy in the second episode of the comedy Motherland. He is credited as a producer for the 2017 feature film My Pure Land.

Patel has been credited as a voice actor in two Doctor Who audio stories. He voiced Biotech Dendry in Day of the Vashta Nerada as well as Engineer and Ayrton Valencia in The Lifeboat and the Deathboat.

In 2019, he made his film debut with his breakthrough role as Jack Malik in Danny Boyle's Yesterday (2019). He sings live throughout the film, covering various songs by The Beatles.

He appeared in The Aeronauts (2019) alongside Felicity Jones and Eddie Redmayne.

Patel was cast as Emery Staines in The Luminaries, a mini-series based on the 2013 book by Eleanor Catton. The plot of the TV series differs from the book. Patel appears on the 2019 Children in Need album. He sang the Killers' song, "All These Things That I've Done". Patel stated in a February 2018 interview that he was working on his first original TV script with What Larks Productions.

In 2019, Patel joined the cast of HBO Max limited series Station Eleven. In 2020, Patel appeared as Jordan Hatwal in the comedy series Avenue 5, starring Hugh Laurie.

In 2020, Patel appeared in the film Tenet as Mahir, a fixer who initially helps Neil and the protagonist in their plot to steal the painting from the Oslo airport. Patel appears in the 2021 Netflix film Don't Look Up, portraying Phillip Kaj, the unscrupulous journalist dating the astronomer, Jennifer Lawrence's Kate Dibiasky, who is responsible for detecting the movie's comet. For his performance and along with the ensemble he received the Screen Actors Guild Award for Outstanding Performance by a Cast in a Motion Picture nomination.

In 2022, Patel made an end credits cameo in Enola Holmes 2 as Dr. John Watson, a role he reprised in a larger capacity for Enola Holmes 3. In 2023, he appeared in the Netflix film Good Grief. In 2024, Patel starred alongside Elizabeth Olsen and Alicia Vikander in The Assessment, and led the HBO satire The Franchise, which was cancelled after one season.

He reunited with Christopher Nolan in the fantasy epic The Odyssey, he played Eurylochus, Odysseus's right hand during The Odyssey.

In March 2026, Deadline Hollywood reported that Patel will star opposite Danielle Deadwyler in the reboot of The X-Files, produced by Ryan Coogler. In October 2026, Hollywood Reporter announced the show had received a series order from Hulu.

== Personal life ==
Patel is a supporter of Tottenham Hotspur F.C. His daughter was born in December 2020.

== Filmography ==
Key
†	Denotes films that have not yet been released

=== Film ===
Year	Title	Role	Notes
2014	Two Dosas	Pavan	Short film
2019	Yesterday	Jack Malik	
2019	The Aeronauts	John Trew	
2020	Tenet	Mahir	
2021	Don't Look Up	Phillip Kaj	
2022	Enola Holmes 2	John Watson	Cameo
2022	The Amazing Maurice	Keith (voice)	
2023	Good Grief	Thomas	
2024	Greedy People	Will Shelley	
2024	The Assessment	Aaryan	
2025	Bubble & Squeak	Declan	
2026	Enola Holmes 3	John Watson	
2026	The Odyssey	Eurylochus	
2027	High in the Clouds †	Wirral (voice)	In production

=== Television ===
Year	Title	Role	Notes
2007–2016	EastEnders	Tamwar Masood	Main role, 580 episodes
2013	Children in Need	Jazz Dancer	1 episode
2016–2018	Damned	Nitin	Main role, 12 episodes
2017	Motherland	Mr. Glencuddy	1 episode
2020	The Luminaries	Emery Staines	Miniseries, 6 episodes
2020	Avenue 5	Jordan Hatwal	Recurring role, 5 episodes
2021–2022	Station Eleven	Jeevan Chaudhary	Miniseries, 10 episodes
2022	Ten Percent	Himself	1 episode
2023	Black Mirror	Himself, Himself as Krish	Episode: "Joan Is Awful"
2024	The Franchise	Daniel Kumar	Main role, 8 episodes
2026	Bait	Raj Thakker	1 episode

=== Stage ===
Year	Title	Role	Venue	Notes
2016	Le Bossu		Edinburgh Festival and Wilton's Music Hall	
2017	Don Juan in Soho	Vagabond	Wyndham's Theatre	

=== Audio ===
Year	Title	Role	Notes
2024	The Mysterious Affair at Styles	Captain Arthur Hastings	Audible original
2025	The A.B.C. Murders	Captain Arthur Hastings	Audible original

== Awards and nominations ==
Year	Award	Category	Work	Result	Notes	Ref.
2019	Teen Choice Award	Choice Summer Movie Actor	Yesterday	Nominated		
2020	Eastern Eye's Arts Culture & Theatre Awards	Eastern Eye Award for Film, TV & Drama - Best Actor	Yesterday	Won		
2022	Screen Actors Guild Award	Outstanding Cast in a Motion Picture	Don't Look Up	Nominated		
2022	Primetime Emmy Awards	Outstanding Lead Actor in a Limited or Anthology Series or Movie	Station Eleven	Nominated		

== Discography ==
=== Soundtrack albums ===
List of soundtrack albums, with selected chart positions
Title	Album details	Peak chart positions
Title	Album details	US
Yesterday	Released: 21 June 2019; Labels: Universal Pictures, Universal Music, Capitol Records; Format: Streaming, CD, digital download	193

=== Other charted songs ===
List of other charted songs, with selected chart positions
Title	Year	Peak chart positions	Album
Title	Year	US Rock	Album
"Yesterday"	2019	39	Yesterday
