= Sharon Duncan-Brewster =

British actress (born 1976)

- Duncan-Brewster in 2026
- Born: 8 February 1976 (age 50); London, England, UK
- Occupation: Actress
- Years active: 1991–present

Sharon Duncan-Brewster (born 8 February 1976) is a British actress. She is known for her role as Liet-Kynes in the 2021 film Dune, and before that as Crystal Gordon in Bad Girls during the first four series (1999–2002); her role as Trina Johnson on EastEnders (2009); and her role as Maggie Cain in the autumn 2009 Doctor Who special, "The Waters of Mars". More recently, she has played Weyland-Yutani scientist Albrecht in Alien: Containment (2019), Senator Tynnra Pamlo across the Star Wars franchise, and a version of Professor Moriarty in Enola Holmes 2 (2022) and Enola Holmes 3 (2026).

== Biography ==
Duncan-Brewster was born and raised in East London as an only child. She went to acting classes as a child at Anna Scher Children’s Theatre.

== Career ==
Duncan-Brewster appeared on the medical TV series Body Story in 1998, playing a club singer and influenza patient named Holly Jones

From 1999–2002, Duncan-Brewster portrayed the role of Crystal Gordon in the first four series of ITV prison drama series Bad Girls. After leaving the programme at the end of its fourth series, she guest-starred in Holby City, Waking the Dead, Babyfather and daytime soap opera Doctors.

From February to September 2009, Duncan-Brewster appeared on the BBC soap opera EastEnders as Trina Johnson, estranged wife of Lucas Johnson. She appeared in the 2009 Doctor Who special "The Waters of Mars" as Maggie Cain.

In 2011, Duncan-Brewster appeared in all four episodes of the TV drama Top Boy. She originated the role of "C" in the play Crave by Sarah Kane.

In 2016 she played the role of Catherine Hunter, who is Alex Hunter's mother, in the FIFA 17's story mode known as "The Journey". she reprised the role of Catherine Hunter in FIFA 18's "The Journey: Hunter Returns" and FIFA 19's "The Journey: Champions".

In the Star Wars universe, she portrays Senator Tynnra Pamlo. She first played the character in Rogue One: A Star Wars Story and later returned to voice the character in Star Wars: The Bad Batch. She reprised the role once more for Andor.

She also portrayed Kitty in the BBC One production of The Long Song in 2018, and Weyland-Yutani scientist Albrecht in Alien: Containment in 2019.

In 2021 she played a female Dr. Liet-Kynes in Dune.

In 2022, Duncan-Brewster starred in Enola Holmes 2 portraying a female version of Professor Moriarty, a role she returns to in Enola Holmes 3 in 2026.

In 2025 she portrayed Nogi in Ballerina alongside Angelica Huston.

== Theater ==
| Year | Title | Role | Notes |
|---|---|---|---|
| 2009 | Seize the Day | | |
| 2011 | Crave | C | |
| 2016 | A Streetcar Named Desire | Stella Kowalski | |
| 2023 | The Odyssey | Odysseus | |
| 2023 | Death of England: Closing Time | | |

== Filmography ==
Key
| † | Denotes works that have not yet been released |

=== Film ===
| Year | Title | Role | Notes |
|---|---|---|---|
| 2005 | Imagine Me & You | Ms. Fosley | |
| 2006 | Shoot the Messenger | Sharlene | |
| 2008 | Three and Out | Yvonne | aka A Deal is a Deal |
| 2011 | Blooded | Eve Jourdan | |
| 2016 | Rogue One | Senator Tynnra Pamlo | |
| 2018 | The Intent 2 | Beverly | |
| 2019 | Alien: Containment | Albrecht | Short film |
| 2021 | Dune | Liet-Kynes | |
| 2022 | Enola Holmes 2 | Moriarty / Mira Troy | |
| 2023 | Earth Mama | Monica | |
| 2025 | Ballerina | Nogi | |
| 2026 | Animol | Joy | |
| 2026 | Enola Holmes 3 | Moriarty / Mira Troy | |

=== Television ===
| Year | Title | Role | Notes |
|---|---|---|---|
| 1991 | 2point4 Children | Baby Maureen | Episode: "Love and Marriage" |
| 1992 | Starting Out | Lisa | Episode: "Tom & Gerry" |
| 1992 | Grange Hill | Girl in cafe #2 | Episode: "Highly Appropriate" |
| 1992 | EastEnders | Andrea | 1 episode |
| 1992 | The Bill | Donna | Episode: "Going Soft" |
| 1992 | Between the Lines | Teenage Girl | Episode: "Private Enterprise" |
| 1993 | Hope I Die Before I Get Old | | TV film |
| 1995 | TV Operas | Pupil, Chorus | Episode: "King of Hearts" |
| 1995 | Backup | Janice | Episode: "Clubbing" |
| 1996 | The Bill | Aisha Bedford | Episode: "Stop the Music" |
| 1998 | Maisie Raine | Informer | Episode: "Happy Families" |
| 1998 | Body Story | Holly Jones | Episode: "The Cold War" |
| 1999 | Casualty | Clare Johnson | Episode: "Seeing the Light" |
| 1999–2002 | Bad Girls | Crystal Gordon | Series 1–4 (main role, 44 episodes) |
| 2002 | Babyfather | Evelyn | 2 episodes |
| 2004 | Holby City | Louise O'Connor | Episode: "The Buck Stops Here" |
| 2005 | Doctors | Rachel Roberts | Episode: "Birthing Pains" |
| 2005 | Waking the Dead | Sarah Baker | 2 episodes |
| 2006 | Holby City | Carmel Newland | Episode: "Horses to Water" |
| 2007 | Coming Up | Annette | Episode: "Spoil" |
| 2007 | Doctors | Cleo Potter | Episode: "The Darker the Berry" |
| 2007 | The Nathan Caton Show | Unknown | Episode(s) unknown |
| 2009 | EastEnders | Trina Johnson | 15 episodes |
| 2009 | Doctor Who | Maggie Cain | Episode: "The Waters of Mars" |
| 2010 | Holby City | Eve King | Episode: 'Til the Grave |
| 2011–2013 | Top Boy: Summerhouse | Lisa | 8 episodes |
| 2011–2015 | Rastamouse | Scratchy (voice) | Animated series; 23 episodes |
| 2013 | The Bible | Samson's mother | Episode: "Homeland" |
| 2013–2014 | The Mimic | Dionne Coombes | 4 episodes |
| 2015 | Cucumber | Maureen | 2 episodes |
| 2015 | Unforgotten | CPS Lawyer | Episode #1.6 |
| 2015 | Cuffs | Karen | Episode #1.4 |
| 2017 | The Boy with the Topknot | Carol | TV film |
| 2018 | The Long Song | Kitty | 2 episodes |
| 2019 | Years and Years | Fran Baxter | 6 episodes |
| 2019–2023 | Sex Education | Roz Marchetti | Recurring role |
| 2021 | Intergalactic | Tula Quick | 8 episodes |
| 2021 | Reset the Stage | Seyi Dunola Balogun | Miniseries |
| 2023 | Star Wars: The Bad Batch | Senator Tynnra Pamlo (voice) | Episode: "The Clone Conspiracy" |
| 2023 | The Swarm | Samantha Crowe | 8 episodes |
| 2023–2024 | Krapopolis | Hegemone (voice) | 2 episodes |
| 2025 | Andor | Senator Tynnra Pamlo | Episode: "Jedha, Kyber, Erso" |
| 2025 | Washington Black | Miss Angie | Miniseries |

=== Video games ===
| Year | Title | Role |
|---|---|---|
| 2016 | FIFA 17 | Catherine Hunter |
| 2017 | FIFA 18 | Catherine Hunter |
| 2018 | FIFA 19 | Catherine Hunter |
