= Mary Parent =

American film executive

- Born: 1968 (age 57–58); United States
- Occupation: Film producer

Mary Parent (born 1968) is an American film producer, and former studio executive.

== Early life and education ==
A native of Santa Barbara, California, Parent studied business at the University of Southern California before launching a modestly successful women's fashion company. Her interest in film led her to take an entry-level job at a talent agency, and she eventually entered the entertainment industry in the early 1990s.

== Career ==
Parent began her executive career at New Line Cinema, where she rose to vice president and helped shepherd projects such as Set It Off and Pleasantville. She later joined Universal Pictures as senior vice president of production, where she oversaw films including 8 Mile (2002), helping launch successful collaborations with filmmakers like Judd Apatow. In 2005, she co-founded the production company Stuber/Parent at Universal.

In 2008, Parent was named chairman and co-CEO of MGM, but left shortly after due to the studio’s financial struggles. She subsequently founded Disruption Entertainment, signing a first-look deal with Paramount Pictures and producing films such as Pacific Rim (2013), Noah (2014), and The Revenant (2015), the latter of which earned her an Academy Award nomination for Best Picture. That year, she placed 28th on The Wall Street Journal's "50 Women to Watch 2008" list.

Since 2016, Parent has served as vice chairman of worldwide production at Legendary Entertainment. She has overseen major projects including Godzilla vs. Kong (2021) and Denis Villeneuve’s adaptation of Dune (2021), which she had advocated for since 2013. Known for her ability to balance creative and financial priorities, Parent has been praised by collaborators for her dedication to storytelling and support of directors' visions.

In 2022, Parent was announced as that year's recipient of the Producers Guild of America's David O. Selznick Achievement Award.

== Filmography ==
She was a producer in all films unless otherwise noted.

=== Film ===
Year	Film	Credit	Ref.
1996	Set It Off	Executive producer	
1997	Trial and Error	Executive producer	
1998	Pleasantville	Executive producer	
2006	You, Me and Dupree		
2007	The Kingdom	Executive producer	
2008	Welcome Home Roscoe Jenkins		
2008	Role Models		
2013	Pacific Rim		
2014	Noah		
2014	Godzilla		
2015	The SpongeBob Movie: Sponge Out of Water		
2015	The Revenant		
2016	Monster Trucks		
2017	Kong: Skull Island		
2017	Same Kind of Different as Me		
2018	Pacific Rim Uprising		
2019	Detective Pikachu		
2019	Godzilla: King of the Monsters		
2020	Enola Holmes		
2021	Godzilla vs. Kong		
2021	Dune		
2022	Bardo, False Chronicle of a Handful of Truths	Executive producer	
2022	Enola Holmes 2		
2023	The Toxic Avenger		
2024	Dune: Part Two		
2024	Godzilla x Kong: The New Empire		
2025	A Minecraft Movie		
2026	Enola Holmes 3		
2026	Street Fighter		
2026	Digger		
2026	Dune: Part Three		
2027	A Minecraft Movie Squared		
TBA	Gundam		

Production manager

Year	Film	Role
1997	Dangerous Ground	Executive in charge of production
