= Louis Partridge =

English actor (born 2003)

- Partridge in 2025
- Born: Louis Patrick James Partridge; 3 June 2003 (age 23); London, England, U.K.
- Education: Alleyn's School
- Occupation: Actor
- Years active: 2014–present

Louis Patrick James Partridge (born 3 June 2003) is an English actor. He began his career as a child actor, and had minor roles in the fantasy films Pan (2015) and Paddington 2 (2017). He portrayed Piero de' Medici in the historical drama series Medici (2019), and had his breakthrough with the Netflix mystery film Enola Holmes (2020) and its sequels (2022–2026). Partridge has since starred in the FX miniseries Pistol (2022), the Apple TV miniseries Disclaimer (2024), and the Netflix historical drama series House of Guinness (2025).

== Early and personal life ==
Partridge was born on 3 June 2003 in Wandsworth, London, into a family of English and Welsh descent to parents, James and Liz Partridge. He has an older sister, Issie, and a younger sister, Millie.

Partridge attended Dulwich Preparatory School, an all-boys' private school in south east London, and played rugby with Battersea Ironsides Sports Club. He then went to secondary school at Alleyn's School, a co-educational private school in Dulwich, where he was a member of Tyson's House. He completed his A Levels in 2021 with As in French, English, and Film Studies.

From 2023 until the end of 2025, Partridge was in a relationship with the American singer-songwriter Olivia Rodrigo.

== Career ==
Partridge made his acting debut in a 2014 short film Beneath Water. Partridge also appeared as an extra in Emil and the Detectives at the National Theatre. Partridge was one of the England mascots at the 2015 Rugby World Cup game against Wales, held at Twickenham Stadium.

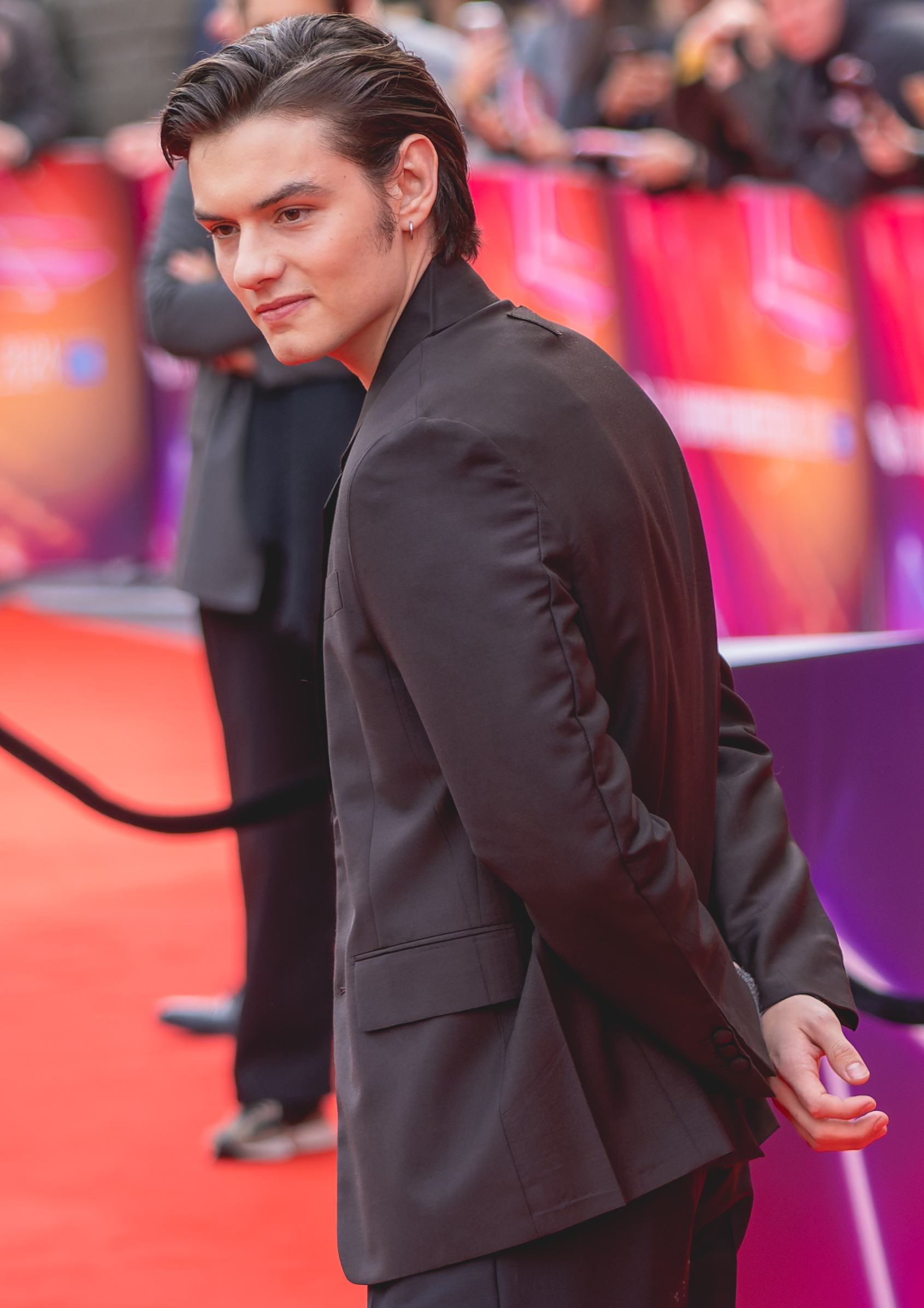
Partridge in 2024

Partridge had early minor roles in the films Pan (2015) and Paddington 2 (2017) and subsequently played Piero de' Medici in the television series Medici (2019). He rose to prominence when he portrayed Viscount Tewkesbury, the love interest of the title character, in the Netflix film Enola Holmes (2020), starring Millie Bobby Brown and Henry Cavill. Ella Kemp of Empire termed him "likeable" in his part. Partridge reprised the role in the film's 2022 sequel.

Also in 2022, Partridge was part of the cast of The Lost Girls, playing the immortal boy Peter Pan. In May 2022, Partridge starred in the FX miniseries Pistol as the titular band's bassist Sid Vicious.

In 2024, Partridge had a cameo in the spy film Argylle as a younger version of the title character played by Henry Cavill. Partridge was also cast as the younger version of the character Timothy Galligan in the ensemble film Jay Kelly. Later that year, Partridge portrayed Jonathan Brigstocke in the Apple TV miniseries Disclaimer.

In 2025, Partridge portrayed Edward Guinness in the Netflix historical drama series House of Guinness. In 2026, Partridge reprised his role as Viscount Tewkesbury in the Netflix film Enola Holmes 3.

Also in 2026, Partridge voiced Jonathan in Audible’s Original Adaptation of Bram Stoker’s Dracula.

== Acting credits ==
Key
†	Denotes projects that have not yet been released

=== Film ===
Year	Title	Role	Notes
2014	Beneath Water	Felix	Short film
2014	About a Dog	Young Gal	Short film
2015	Pan	Lost Boy Miner	
2016	Second Skin	Nature Boy	Short film
2017	Amazon Adventure	Young Henry Bates	
2017	Paddington 2	G-Man	
2019	Breck's Last Game	Breck Bednar	Short film
2020	Enola Holmes	Viscount Earnest Augustus Tewkesbury	
2022	Enola Holmes 2	Viscount Earnest Augustus Tewkesbury	
2022	The Lost Girls	Peter Pan	
2024	Argylle	Young Agent Aubrey Argylle	
2025	Jay Kelly	Young Timothy Galligan	
2026	Enola Holmes 3	Viscount Earnest Augustus Tewkesbury	
TBA	The Official Mistress †	Rene Rennault	

=== Television ===
Year	Title	Role	Notes
2014	Boomers	Alf	Episode: "Joyce's Retirement Party"
2019	Medici	Piero de' Medici	4 episodes
2022	Pistol	Sid Vicious	Television miniseries
2024	Disclaimer	Jonathan Brigstocke	Television miniseries
2025	House of Guinness	Edward Guinness	8 episodes
2026	Pride and Prejudice †	George Wickham	Television miniseries

=== Theatre ===
Year	Title	Role	Theatre
2013	Emil and the Detectives	Team Sherlock	National Theatre
