= Harry Bradbeer =

British film and television director

Harry Bradbeer is a British director, producer, and writer. He is known for his work on the television series Fleabag and Killing Eve, and the films Enola Holmes and Enola Holmes 2.

== Career ==
In 2001, Bradbeer directed the television political drama movie, As The Beast Sleeps, which was based on Gary Mitchell’s play about his loyalist community in Belfast at the time of the 1994 ceasefire. The film was an official selection at the Edinburgh Film Festival, London Film Festival, and Edinburgh Showcase in New York, and appeared at the Montreal, Gothenburg, Boston and New York Festivals. Additionally, in 2002, it won the Belfast Arts Award for Television and took third place at the Prix Europa Festival.

Between 2016 and 2018, Bradbeer directed two seasons of Fleabag.

In February 2019, it was announced that Bradbeer was to direct Enola Holmes, a feature adaptation of The Enola Holmes Mysteries by Nancy Springer, and produced by Legendary Pictures. Adapted by Jack Thorne, it went into production in July 2019 and starred Millie Bobby Brown, Henry Cavill, Helena Bonham Carter, Sam Claflin, Fiona Shaw, Adeel Akhtar, Frances de la Tour, Louis Partridge, Susie Wokoma, and Burn Gorman.

In January 2020, it was announced that Bradbeer had signed to direct the feature film Seance on a Wet Afternoon for Legendary Entertainment. Additionally, it was announced that Bradbeer signed on as co-creator and executive producer of Viewpoint, a surveillance crime thriller for ITV/Tiger Aspect. This year, Bradbeer also signed a first-look deal with Amazon to develop and create television series exclusively on the streaming platform.

In January 2022, Bradbeer was set to direct Eleanor Oliphant is Completely Fine, a feature adaptation of Gail Honeyman's novel of the same name.

In May 2024, it was announced that Bradbeer would serve as a director and executive producer for Spider-Noir starring Nicolas Cage.

== Personal life ==
Bradbeer married the writer Nino Strachey, at St Nicholas Church, Tresco, Isles of Scilly on 24 October 1998.

== Filmography ==
TV short

- A Night with a Woman, a Day with Charlie (1994) (Also writer)

TV series

Year	Title	Director	Executive Producer	Episode(s)
1995	Shooting Gallery	Yes	No	"Love Hurts"
1997	This Life	Yes	No	"The Plumber Always Rings Twice"
1997	This Life	Yes	No	"She's Gotta Get It"
1997	This Life	Yes	No	"When the Dope Comes In"
1996–99	The Bill	Yes	No	"Slinging Mud"
1996–99	The Bill	Yes	No	"Out"
1996–99	The Bill	Yes	No	"Hot Plastic"
1996–99	The Bill	Yes	No	"Too Much to Lose"
1996–99	The Bill	Yes	No	"Last Respects"
1996–99	The Bill	Yes	No	"Copier"
1996–99	The Bill	Yes	No	"Jumping to Conclusions"
1996–99	The Bill	Yes	No	"Track Marks"
1996–99	The Bill	Yes	No	"Presumed Innocent"
1998–99	The Cops	Yes	No	"Potshots"
1998–99	The Cops	Yes	No	"Wasted"
1998–99	The Cops	Yes	No	"Swinging Hammers"
1998–99	The Cops	Yes	No	"Culminate"
1998–99	The Cops	Yes	No	"Walking Disaster"
1998–99	The Cops	Yes	No	"Walking the Line"
1998–99	The Cops	Yes	No	"Taking Liberties"
1998–99	The Cops	Yes	No	"Fallen Angels"
2000	Attachments	Yes	No	"Ohnosecond"
2000	Attachments	Yes	No	"Hot Mail"
2000	Attachments	Yes	No	"Plug & Play"
2000	Attachments	Yes	No	"Just Upgraded"
2004	Outlaws	Yes	No	"The Value of Nothing"
2004	Outlaws	Yes	No	"Little Criminals"
2004	Outlaws	Yes	No	"T.I.C. the Box"
2004	Outlaws	Yes	No	"The Good, the Bad and the Ugly"
2005–06	No Angels	Yes	No	4 episodes
2005–06	Sugar Rush	Yes	No	10 episodes
2008	Messiah: The Rapture	Yes	No	2 episodes
2010	Lip Service	Yes	No	2 episodes
2011	The Hour	Yes	No	"A Country Affair"
2011	The Hour	Yes	No	"Crises at Home and Abroad"
2012–13	Prisoners' Wives	Yes	No	7 episodes
2014	Grantchester	Yes	No	2 episodes
2015	No Offence	Yes	No	2 episodes
2015–16	Dickensian	Yes	No	5 episodes
2018	Killing Eve	Yes	No	"I'll Deal with Him Later"
2018	Killing Eve	Yes	No	"Nice Face"
2016–19	Fleabag	Yes	Yes	11 episodes
2019	Ramy	Yes	Yes	"Between the Toes"
2026	Spider-Noir	Yes	Yes	2 episodes

TV movies

- As the Beast Sleeps (2002)
- A Is for Acid (2002)
- The Brides in the Bath (2003)
- Perfect Day: The Millennium (2006)

Video game

- TOCA Race Driver 2 (2004)

Feature film

Year	Title	Director	Executive Producer	Writer
2020	Enola Holmes	Yes	Yes	No
2022	Enola Holmes 2	Yes	Yes	Story
TBA	A Matter of Time	Yes	No	No

== Awards and nominations ==
British Academy Television Awards

Year	Category	Title	Result	Ref.
1998	Best Drama Series	The Cops	Won	
2018	Best Drama Series	Killing Eve	Won	

Geneva International Film Festival

Year	Category	Title	Result
2011	Best International Television Series	The Hour	Won

Online Film & Television Association

Year	Category	Title	Result	Ref.
2012	Best Direction of a Motion Picture or Miniseries	The Hour	Nominated	

Primetime Emmy Awards

Year	Category	Title	Result	Ref.
2019	Outstanding Comedy Series	Fleabag	Won	
2019	Outstanding Directing for a Comedy Series (For episode "Episode 1")	Fleabag	Won	

Golden Globe Awards

Year	Category	Title	Result
2020	Best Television Series – Musical or Comedy	Fleabag	Won

Producers Guild of America Awards

Year	Category	Title	Result	Ref.
2020	Best Episodic Comedy	Fleabag	Won	

In July 2021, the University College London (UCL), where Bradbeer previously graduated with a degree in Medieval and Modern History, awarded him with an Honorary Doctor of Literature (DLit) for his exceptional achievements and contributions throughout his career. Upon receiving this recognition, Bradbeer said: “I am delighted to receive this honour. UCL was a truly creative environment. It was here that I first explored the world of film, and I’m eternally grateful for the part it played in starting my career.”
