= Enola Holmes (film) =

2020 film by Harry Bradbeer

- Release poster
- Directed by: Harry Bradbeer
- Screenplay by: Jack Thorne
- Based on: The Case of the Missing Marquess: An Enola Holmes Mystery by Nancy Springer
- Produced by: Mary Parent; Alex Garcia; Ali Mendes; Millie Bobby Brown; Paige Brown
- Starring: Millie Bobby Brown; Sam Claflin; Henry Cavill; Helena Bonham Carter
- Cinematography: Giles Nuttgens
- Edited by: Adam Bosman
- Music by: Daniel Pemberton
- Production companies: Legendary Pictures; PCMA Productions
- Distributed by: Netflix
- Release date: September 23, 2020
- Running time: 123 minutes
- Countries: United Kingdom; United States
- Language: English

Enola Holmes is a 2020 mystery film starring Millie Bobby Brown as the title character, the teenage sister of the already famous Victorian-era detective Sherlock Holmes. The film is directed by Harry Bradbeer from a screenplay by Jack Thorne that adapts the first novel in The Enola Holmes Mysteries series by Nancy Springer. It tells the story of Sherlock Holmes and Mycroft Holmes' younger sister Enola who travels to London to find her missing mother, but pairs up with a runaway lord as they attempt to solve a mystery that threatens the country. The film also stars Henry Cavill, Sam Claflin, and Helena Bonham Carter.

Filming began in July 2019. Originally planned for a cinematic release by Warner Bros. Pictures, the distribution rights to the film were picked up by Netflix due to the COVID-19 pandemic. Enola Holmes was released on September 23, 2020. The film received positive reviews from critics, who praised Brown's performance. It became one of the most-watched original Netflix film releases, with an estimated 76 million households watching the film over its first four weeks.

A sequel, Enola Holmes 2, was released on Netflix on November 4, 2022. A third film, Enola Holmes 3, was released on July 1, 2026.

== Plot ==
Enola Holmes is the youngest child in the Holmes family, she is extremely intelligent, observant, and insightful. Her mother Eudoria has taught her everything from chess to jujitsu and encouraged her to be strong-willed and independent, to defy the social norms for women of the time.

On her sixteenth birthday, Enola wakes to find that her mother has disappeared, leaving behind only some gifts. A week later, she meets her older brothers Mycroft and Sherlock. Sherlock finds her intelligent, whereas Mycroft finds her troublesome and as her legal guardian, intends to send her away to a finishing school run by Miss Harrison, his old friend.

The flower cards left by her mother reveal secret messages and lead to hidden money, which Enola uses to escape, disguised as a boy. On the train, she finds the young Viscount Tewkesbury hidden in a travel bag. Enola thinks he is a nincompoop, but warns him that a man in a brown bowler hat named Linthorn is on the train searching for him. Linthorn finds and tries to kill Tewkesbury, who escapes with Enola by jumping off the train. He forages for edible plants and fungi, they return to London and part ways.

Dressed as a Victorian lady, Enola continues to trace Eudoria, leaving cryptic messages in the newspaper personal advertisements. Enola discovers pamphlets and a safehouse containing explosives, and learns that Eudoria is part of a radical group of suffragettes. She is attacked by Linthorn, who interrogates her about Tewkesbury, then attempts to kill her. Enola fights back, ignites the explosives in the safehouse and escapes.

Enola decides to find Tewkesbury again, to save him from Linthorn. She visits the Tewkesbury estate, where she meets Tewkesbury's grandmother, the Dowager. Mycroft has Inspector Lestrade of Scotland Yard search for Enola Holmes.

Enola finds Tewkesbury selling flowers in Covent Garden and warns him of Linthorn. Taking him to her lodgings, she is caught by Lestrade, and Mycroft forces her to go to Miss Harrison's finishing school. Sherlock visits Enola and admits he is impressed by her detective work. Tewkesbury sneaks into the school and they escape together, stealing Miss Harrison's motor car. Enola decides they must go to Basilwether Hall and face Tewkesbury's uncle, who she has deduced was trying to kill him.

The estate is seemingly deserted, but Linthorn ambushes them. Enola trips him using jujitsu, causing a fatal head injury. Tewkesbury's grandmother is revealed to have hired Linthorn. As a staunch traditionalist, she did not want Tewkesbury to take his father's place in the House of Lords and vote for the Reform Bill. She shoots him, but he survives, having hidden a plate of armor under his clothes. Sherlock arrives at Scotland Yard, where Lestrade informs him of Enola's actions as they plan to have the Dowager arrested.

Enola shares a tearful goodbye with Tewkesbury. She eavesdrops on a meeting between Sherlock and Mycroft, where Sherlock suggests becoming her guardian. Upon returning to her lodgings, Enola finds Eudoria waiting there. She explains why she had to leave, and why she must leave again, but she is impressed by what Enola has become. Enola has found her purpose—she is a detective and a finder of lost souls.

== Cast ==
- Millie Bobby Brown as Enola Holmes, the youngest sibling in the famous Holmes family. Enola occasionally breaks the fourth wall, talking directly to the audience.
  - Sofia Stavrinou portrays a younger Enola.
- Henry Cavill as Sherlock Holmes, the second-eldest of the Holmes siblings and a renowned private detective
- Sam Claflin as Mycroft Holmes, the eldest of the Holmes siblings; a government employee and Enola's legal guardian.
- Helena Bonham Carter as Eudoria Holmes, the matriarch of the Holmes family.
- Louis Partridge as Tewkesbury
- Burn Gorman as Linthorn, a man who targets Tewkesbury and Enola
- Adeel Akhtar as Lestrade, an associate of Sherlock Holmes who works at Scotland Yard
- Susie Wokoma as Edith, a friend of Eudoria and suffragettes who runs a secret martial arts class.
- Hattie Morahan as Lady Tewkesbury, Tewkesbury's mother
- David Bamber as Sir Whimbrel Tewkesbury, Tewkesbury's uncle
- Frances de la Tour as The Dowager, Tewkesbury's grandmother
- Claire Rushbrook as Mrs. Lane, the Holmes family's housekeeper
- Fiona Shaw as Miss Harrison, the stern headmistress of a finishing school
- Ellie Haddington as Miss Gregory, a seamstress

== Production ==
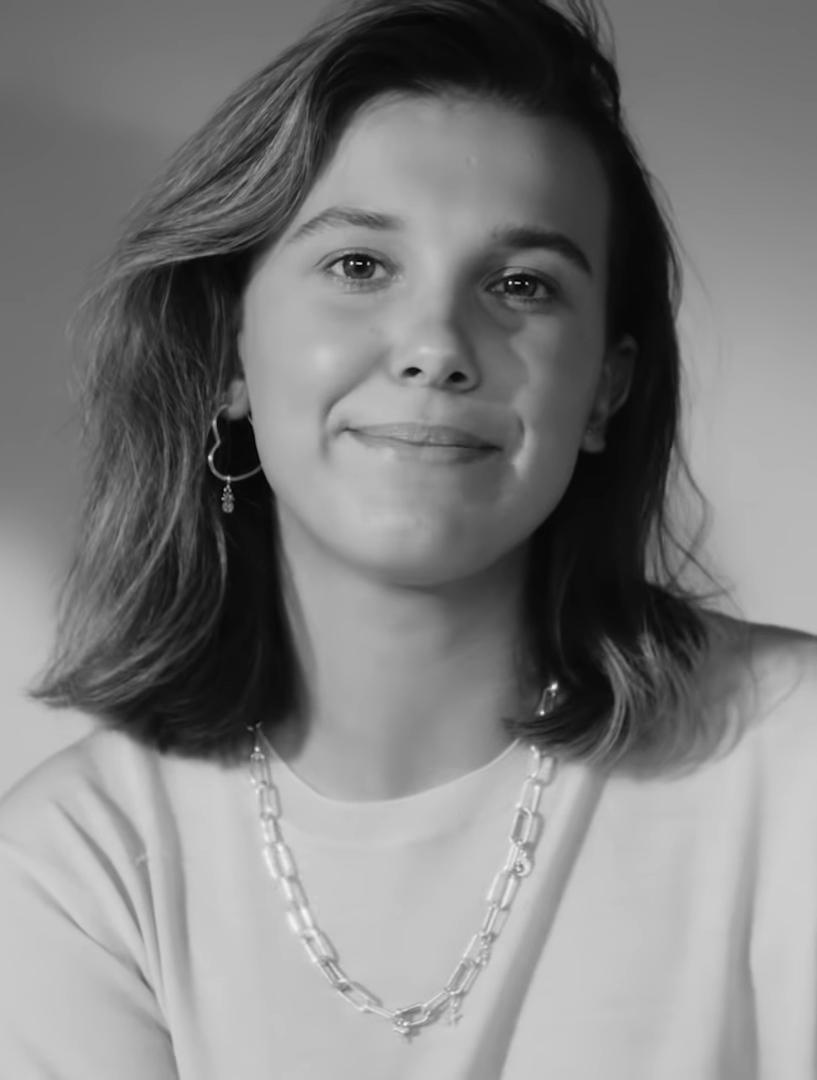
Brown served as producer and starred in the title role.

By February 2019, a film adaptation of the book series The Enola Holmes Mysteries by Nancy Springer was in development at Legendary Pictures, with Millie Bobby Brown producing and starring in the title role and Harry Bradbeer set to direct. The film adapts the first book, The Case of the Missing Marquess, in which the younger sister of famed detective Sherlock Holmes goes on an adventure after her mother's disappearance. Brown had read the books with her older sister Paige and immediately wanted to play the role of Enola, but wasn't yet old enough to play the character. She later told her father they should make it into a film and partnered with Legendary Pictures, the same company she had previously worked with on Godzilla: King of the Monsters. Brown and Bradbeer discussed the film and wanted energy, emotion and eccentricity as key elements of the film. Brown discussed with writer Jack Thorne how she wanted to break the fourth wall. Bradbeer was enthusiastic about the script since it combined his interest in stories about "dysfunctional families coming to terms with each other" with his love of Sherlock Holmes. Brown took the opportunity to improvise, something she would not do on television series Stranger Things, which is heavily scripted and because the character of Enola Holmes allowed for it. Capturing those moments and keeping up with Brown proved challenging for the focus puller.

In June 2019, Henry Cavill, Helena Bonham Carter, Adeel Akhtar and Fiona Shaw joined the cast, with Sam Claflin, Louis Partridge, Susie Wokoma and Burn Gorman joining in July as filming began in London. Railway scenes were filmed in Worcestershire at Arley railway station, Kidderminster Town railway station and Victoria Bridge on the Severn Valley Railway. The Holmes family residence Ferndell Hall was filmed at Benthall Hall in Shropshire. Benthall Hall had not previously been used as a filming location, and the production design team received great help from the head groundskeeper who allowed the place to become overgrown to achieve the look they needed. Interiors were shot at West Horsley Place in Surrey. False walls were put up and inspired by the Arts and Crafts movement they included plant motifs in the decorations and period wallpaper. The East End and Limehouse Lane locations were created among outbuildings at Luton Hoo in Bedfordshire. The scene in which Sherlock and Mycroft try to meet Enola was filmed at Drum Court within HM Treasury Buildings in Westminster.

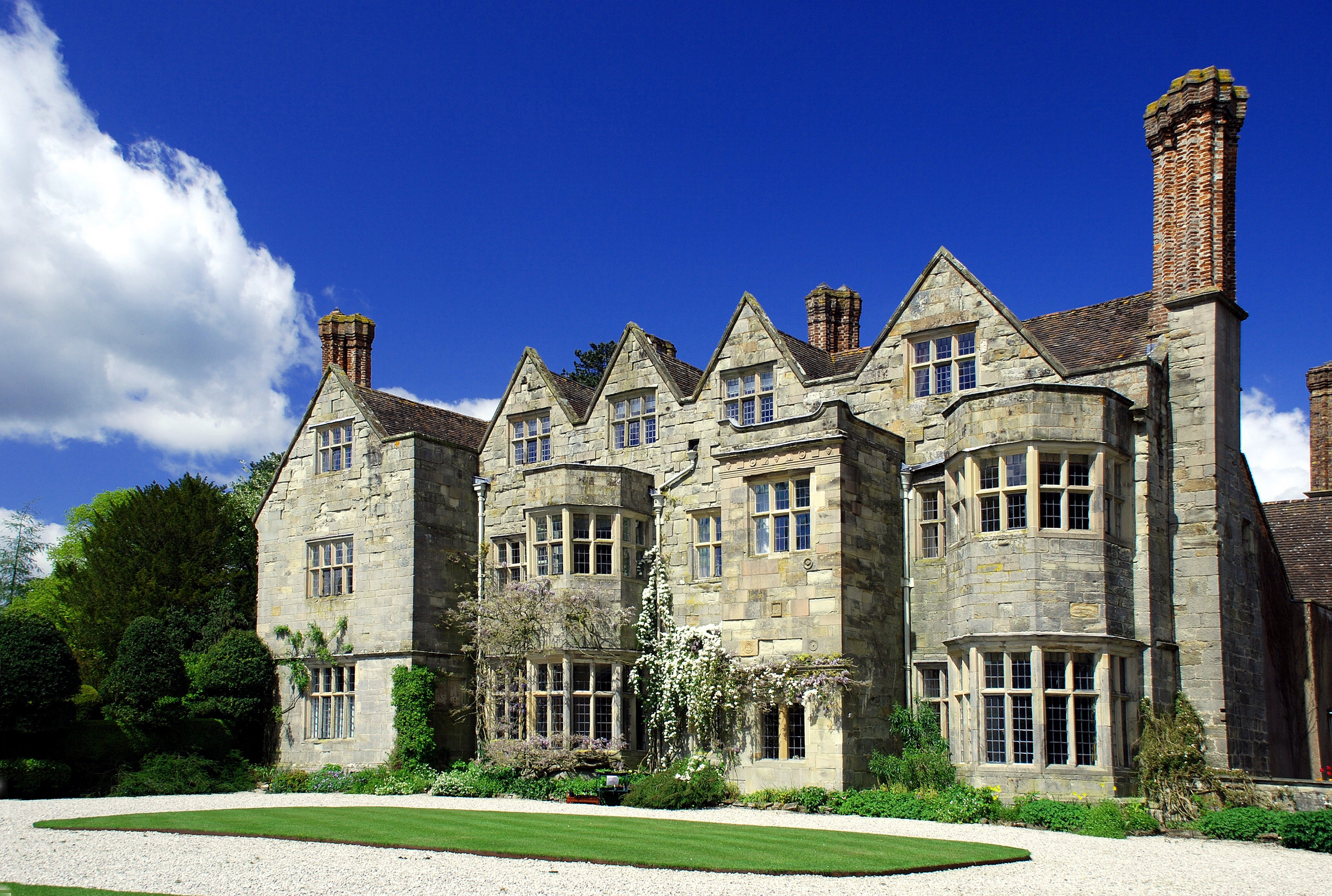
Benthall Hall in Shropshire was used as the exterior for the Holmes family residence Ferndell Hall

Bonham Carter called her role the "smallest, greatest part I've been offered" and her agent tried to discourage her from taking on such a minor part. She was appreciative of the depth of the character despite her limited screen time. In the final cut, Eudoria did ultimately appear more than in the initial script.

Consolata Boyle was responsible for creating the costumes. Boyle and her team custom-designed, dyed and made the costumes for the main cast and background actors. Approximately thirty costumes were created for Enola, and costumes such as the red powderpuff dress had to be repeated several more times because of the physicality of the role and any damage that might occur during fight scenes. The powderpuff dress was based on theatrical costumes of the period, and Boyle wanted to use red, the color of courage. Boyle's favorite was Enola's final dress, it used the same shape as the first dress Enola wore while riding the bicycle bringing the costumes back full circle, but also the natural untreated silk used in the final dress has no strong color and "it allows for anything to happen next." The colors violet, green and ivory were associated with the suffragette movement so Boyle consciously made use of those colors in the costumes.

Visual effects were supervised by Michael Ellis and done by Mr. X and Host VFX.

=== Lawsuit ===
In a lawsuit filed by the Conan Doyle Estate against Netflix, the estate claimed that Netflix had violated copyright law by depicting Sherlock Holmes as warmly emotional in his personal relationships. They argued this aspect of the character did not fall under the public domain as Sherlock was previously cold or unemotional, only becoming more open in stories published between 1923 and 1927, and the copyright for the stories published in that period still had not expired under copyright law in the United States. Cavill said that his portrayal of Sherlock was "a lot more emotional to begin with, so we pared it back, and we said, 'Alright, let's not make it too emotional'." On the lawsuit he said, "It's a character from a page which we worked out from the screenplay. The legal stuff is above my pay grade."

On October 30, 2020, lawyers for the defendants filed a motion to dismiss, saying the estate was unfairly attempting to prevent the fair use of characters that are "undeniably in the public domain". On December 18, 2020, the lawsuit was dismissed with prejudice by stipulation of all parties. In 2023, the final Sherlock Holmes stories entered the public domain as the US copyrights for The Case-Book of Sherlock Holmes expired.

=== Music ===
In July 2019, Daniel Pemberton was announced as composer of the film's score. The soundtrack was released on September 23, 2020. Pemberton described it as "unashamedly melodic and emotional orchestral music" with some "messy quirky oddness thrown in as well".

== Release ==
Originally intended to be a theatrical release by Warner Bros. Pictures, in April 2020, Netflix picked up the worldwide distribution rights to the film due to the COVID-19 pandemic, except for in China. It was digitally released on September 23, 2020.

To promote the film in the United Kingdom, Netflix installed a series of statues of famous sisters next to existing statues of their famous brothers. They also released a free play at home adventure game in collaboration with Escape Hunt UK called An Enola Holmes Adventure.

== Reception ==
=== Audience viewership ===
In its debut weekend Enola Holmes was the second most-watched item on Netflix, behind the television series Ratched. Over its first five days it was the most watched film on Netflix, as the film went on to become the biggest first day opening Netflix title in 2020 as well as dominating the largest number of Netflix's monitored countries. In October 2020, Netflix reported the film was on-track to have 76 million households watch the film over its first four weeks of release. In November, Variety reported that according to data by ScreenEngine/ASI the film was the 13th most watched straight-to-streaming title of 2020 up to that date. The film was the seventh most searched film globally on Google in 2020.

In January 2021, Enola Holmes ranked 7th on Business Insider's Biggest Netflix Original Movies of All Time with 78 million viewership.

=== Critical response ===
On Rotten Tomatoes, the film has an approval rating of 91% based on 207 reviews, with an average rating of 7.1/10. The website's critics consensus reads: "Enola Holmes brings a breath of fresh air to Baker Street – and leaves plenty of room for Millie Bobby Brown to put her effervescent stamp on a franchise in waiting." On Metacritic, it has a weighted average score of 68 out of 100, based on reviews from 30 critics, indicating "generally favorable" reviews.

Peter Debruge of Variety called the film an "entertaining franchise starter" and praised Brown's performance, stating that "[her] acting style recalls the effusive spontaneity Keira Knightley brought to Pride and Prejudice, shattering the straitlaced propriety of so many Jane Austen adaptations before it." Debruge found the film "more tasteful in its high-energy storytelling than Guy Ritchie's recent Sherlock Holmes movies, and considerably more fun than [2019]'s Nancy Drew reboot." John DeFore of The Hollywood Reporter gave the film a positive review and wrote: "It successfully imagines a place for its heroine in Holmes' world, then convinces young viewers that Enola needn't be constrained by that world's borders." Ann Hornaday of The Washington Post wrote: "Enola Holmes offers brisk and exuberant escape from the heaviness of modern times, with its leading actress lending her own appealing touches to the journey. When the game is afoot, she's more than capable, not just of keeping up, but winning the day." Ella Kemp of Empire magazine wrote: "Well-intentioned if sometimes lacking in subtlety, Enola Holmes offers a fine, spirited reminder that a traditional story can always be retold – although it might need more refined teachings on feminism next time." Peter Bradshaw of The Guardian gave a mixed review, saying: "It all rattles along amiably enough. Enola Holmes is the kind of all-star production that might once have been made by the BBC" but had some criticism for the mystery elements of the story "there should have been more specifically ingenious deducting and solving from Enola – codebreaking isn't the same thing."

In a negative review, Mick LaSalle of the San Francisco Chronicle wrote: "A bright young actress, a movie-star actor and a potentially interesting concept gets smothered in 128 minutes of colorful, empty nonsense."

=== Accolades ===
Award	Date of ceremony	Category	Recipients	Result	Ref.
Kids' Choice Awards	March 13, 2021	Favorite Movie Actress	Millie Bobby Brown	Won	
Las Vegas Film Critics Society	March 5, 2021	Youth in Film – Female	Millie Bobby Brown	Won	
London Film Critics' Circle	February 7, 2021	Young British/Irish Performer of the Year	Millie Bobby Brown	Nominated	
Online Film & Television Association	April 4, 2021	Best Youth Performance	Millie Bobby Brown	Nominated	
Seattle Film Critics Society	February 15, 2021	Best Youth Performance	Millie Bobby Brown	Nominated	
Washington D.C. Area Film Critics Association	February 8, 2021	Best Youth Performance	Millie Bobby Brown	Nominated	
Saturn Awards	October 26, 2021	Best Film Presentation in Streaming Media	Enola Holmes	Won	

== Sequel ==
In September 2020, Brown and Bradbeer acknowledged their intentions to develop a sequel. Brown said she thought only about making the first film until she was on set, then she loved playing the character and said it would be a dream to do it again.

On May 13, 2021, Enola Holmes 2 was officially announced, with writer Jack Thorne and director Harry Bradbeer returning while Brown and Cavill would reprise their roles. In September 2021, it was announced that Partridge and Bonham Carter would reprise their roles.

Production and filming began in Autumn 2021 and wrapped in January 2022. The film was released on Netflix on November 4, 2022.
