= The Enola Holmes Mysteries =

Young adult fiction series by Nancy Springer

- First book in the series
- The Case of the Missing Marquess; The Case of the Left-Handed Lady; The Case of the Bizarre Bouquets; The Case of the Peculiar Pink Fan; The Case of the Cryptic Crinoline; The Case of the Gypsy Goodbye; Enola Holmes and The Black Barouche; Enola Holmes and The Boy in Buttons; Enola Holmes and The Elegant Escapade; Enola Holmes and The Mark of the Mongoose; Enola Holmes and The Clanging Coffin
- Author: Nancy Springer
- Language: English
- Genre: Young adult
- Publisher: Penguin Young Readers
- Published: 2006–2010; 2021–2023
- Media type: Print (Hardback & Paperback)

The Enola Holmes Mysteries is a young adult fiction series of detective novels by American author Nancy Springer, starring Enola Holmes as the 14-year-old sister of an already famous Sherlock Holmes, twenty years her senior. There are ten books in the series, and one short story all written from 2006–2023. This pastiche series borrows characters and settings from the established canon of Sherlock Holmes, but the Enola character is Springer's creation and specific to this series.

The first book, The Case of the Missing Marquess, and the fifth, The Case of the Cryptic Crinoline, were nominated for the Edgar Award for Best Juvenile Mystery in 2007 and 2010, respectively.

In 2020, the series was adapted into a film with Millie Bobby Brown in the title role and Henry Cavill playing Sherlock Holmes, and two sequels, released in 2022 and 2026.

== Development ==
Before writing The Enola Holmes Mysteries, Nancy Springer had already published books that reimagined Mordred and Robin Hood. Springer developed the idea for Enola Holmes alongside her editor, Michael Green. Green initially asked her to explore "deepest, darkest London at the time of Jack the Ripper." After some research, she realized that Sherlock Holmes was based in the same time period as Jack the Ripper. Springer rejected the idea of giving Holmes a daughter but thought the idea of a younger sister could work.

To write the series, Springer researched about Victorian era England, both from historical research and through coloring books, which, according to her, it helps "visualize the details" when writing. She referred to The Annotated Sherlock Holmes by William Baring-Gould. She did not have too much difficulty in using the language of the time period since she was well versed with Victorian literature.

When creating the character of Enola, Springer decided to have her as Holmes' sister, as she did not see it fitting for Holmes to be her father. The age discrepancy between Enola and Sherlock is explained as Enola being a "mistake child". For the main character's name, she researched romantic names of the era, and set on the one of a town near where she resided at the time.

Sherlock's status as a bachelor and being "clueless about women" also played a role on the creation of Enola Holmes, as it allowed Springer to write a character that "could blindside him time after time."

Springer has also stated that Enola is partially based on her own life. She herself is much younger than her two older brothers, who left for college before she reached puberty. Springer, too, had an artist for a mother, who was talented with painting watercolor flowers. Due to cancer, menopause and an early-onset form of dementia, Springer's mother spent less time with her after she turned 14 years old. Further, like Enola, Springer "was a scrawny, bony, gawky tree-climbing tomboy with hair that needed to be washed" and was "solitary and bookish."

In the Enola Holmes' books and films, Enola explains that her name spelled backwards is "alone", which describes her solitary nature.

== Series overview ==
On Enola's fourteenth birthday, her mother disappears, and Sherlock and Mycroft, Enola's brothers, conclude that her mother voluntarily left. Enola is devastated but eventually discovers elaborate ciphers her mother wrote, which lead her to conclude that she left to live with the Romani people and escape the confines of Victorian society. Enola finds that her mother left money to fund her escape. When Mycroft, the eldest sibling, insists that Enola attend boarding school and learn to be a proper lady, she runs away to London instead. Throughout the series, Enola solves numerous missing persons cases, including a rescue of Dr. John Watson, while eluding her brothers' efforts to recapture her.

=== Enola Holmes and the Case of the Missing Marquess (2006) ===
When Enola's mother disappears, Enola calls on her older brothers Sherlock and Mycroft, who dismiss her as unimportant. Horrified by her brothers' plans to send her to a boarding school and the prospect of wearing a corset, she escapes. Dressed as a widow, she runs across Inspector Lestrade, who is working on a case with Sherlock about the disappearance of a young Viscount, Lord Tewkesbury. Nearly blowing her cover, she finds a secret hiding place that seems to be the young Viscount's hideaway. Concluding that he ran away, she sets off to look for him. Upon arriving in London, Enola discovers the city is not the magical place of her imagination. The same people who have kidnapped the Viscount, who has no street smarts, kidnap Enola. After escaping with the Viscount, she bribes a woman to buy them clothing. Hiding in a police station right under Sherlock's nose, Enola runs away, leaving only a sketch of the suspect on the bench.

=== Enola Holmes and the Case of the Left-Handed Lady (2007) ===
Enola tries to find Lady Cecily Alistair, who disappeared from her bedroom. Enola, after disguising herself, talks to Lady Cecily's family, who think she has run off with the son of a tradesman. Enola finds some strange paintings that make her doubt that notion, and goes to find their daughter.

=== Enola Holmes and the Case of the Bizarre Bouquets (2008) ===
Sherlock's companion, Dr. John Watson, has gone missing. Enola discovers a bouquet of flowers intended for Watson. Using the language of the flowers, she detects a threat and sets out to find the missing doctor and his kidnapper. Through clever investigation and reasoning, she deduces that he has been falsely admitted to an insane asylum, then manipulates her brothers into rescuing him.

=== Enola Holmes and the Case of the Peculiar Pink Fan (2008) ===
Enola helps an old acquaintance, Lady Cecily, escape a forced marriage to the young Lady's cousin (such things were common then, to keep property within the family). While escaping an evil man and his mastiff, Enola runs right into trouble. Meanwhile, little does she know, Sherlock is only a few steps behind her.

=== Enola Holmes and the Case of the Cryptic Crinoline (2009) ===
Enola returns to her lodgings to find that somebody has kidnapped her landlady, Mrs. Tupper. After investigating the ransacked lodgings, she abduces that the kidnappers were after a secret message hidden in Mrs. Tupper's old crinoline, the stiffening garment worn underneath the full skirt of a dress. Enola traces the secret message to Florence Nightingale, who met Mrs. Tupper in the Crimean War. After several visits to Nightingale, Enola discovers that Nightingale conducted espionage during the war. As such, Nightingale asked Mrs. Tupper to smuggle a message in her crinoline back to England but did not know that the war widow was deaf and did not understand her. Enola also realizes that Nightingale pretends to be an invalid to avoid attending social functions expected of a wealthy woman, because the functions would take time away from writing letters to achieve social reform for the needy. During her visits to Nightingale, Enola suspects someone is following her. As the person could be related to the case and a danger to Mrs. Tupper's and her own safety, she relocates to the Professional Women's Club.

After solving the case, she takes Mrs. Tupper and herself back to her home. Enola packs her things as she gets ready to leave. After figuring this out, Mrs. Tupper does the same. Mrs. Tupper ends up going with Enola. She escapes upon seeing Sherlock approach. Sherlock converses with Nightingale, and she reveals the reason behind Enola's escape from her brothers by describing the horrors of boarding schools and corsets.

=== Enola Holmes and the Case of the Gypsy Goodbye (2010) ===
Finally, in Enola's sixth case, Sherlock concludes that Enola has matured rapidly into a capable young woman and helps his sister not only to find her quarry but also to finally convince their older brother Mycroft of her skill.

In the end, the Holmes siblings fully reconcile with the help of a final coded message from their mother, a Spartan scytale decoded using bicycle handlebars. With that resolution, Mycroft, further impressed with Enola's sophisticated business arrangements and satisfied with her residence at the Professional Women's Club, grants Enola her liberty and agrees to fund her education. Enola in turn forgives Mycroft, accepts his offer while announcing she is likely continuing her career as a private investigator. For his part, Sherlock accepts Enola as a colleague in his profession and notes that he eagerly awaits her future accomplishments.

This book is also known as Enola Holmes and the Case of the Disappearing Duchess.

=== Enola Holmes and the Black Barouche (2021) ===
Enola and Sherlock are hired by Letitia "Tish" Glover, a young woman whose twin sister, Lady Felicity "Flossie" Rudcliff, has been declared dead by her husband, Cadogan Burr Rudcliff, the Earl of Dunhench. Tish believes Flossie is still alive, claiming she would have felt it if Flossie had left this world. While investigating the Dunhench estate in disguise, Enola notices an unusual composition in Flossies newest painting. The trees seem to spell out "sent to mental asylum" with their branches. Enola and Tish come up with a plan to find the location of this asylum by having the latter pretend to be an escaped Felicity. Thus, with the help from Sherlock, Watson and Tewkesbury, they can uncover the truth behind Flossie's disappearance.

=== Enola Holmes and the Boy in Buttons (2021) ===
Enola Holmes, the much younger sister of Sherlock and Mycroft, owns a building in the heart of 19th century London, a place she uses under pseudonyms to front for her investigative work. Employed there is a porter - Joddy, a young boy in a uniform festooned with buttons - whose even younger brother Paddy substitutes for him when he's sick. But Paddy disappears after one day at the job and Enola Holmes is alerted to this by the still ill Joddy.

Determined to find the missing porter, Enola travels to the rough part of London where the boys live and starts searching Aldgate Pump area for the missing boy. When she finds the missing buttons - but not the boy - she decides that drastic action is essential if she's to save the missing boy.

This is a short story, not a novel. This title is only available as an ebook or audiobook.

=== Enola Holmes and the Elegant Escapade (2022) ===
Enola Holmes, is terribly worried about her friend Lady Cecily Alistair. Life in 19th-century London affords 17-year-old Lady Cecily little autonomy, and she suffers under the hand of her abusive, social-climbing father, Lord Eustace, who left her with aunts who starve her and cut her off from all she loves. As Enola enlists to help Cecily, she realizes that Lord Eustace’s mistreatment has had a terrible impact on her friend’s psyche. In Cecily’s fragile state, she goes missing: Will Enola be able to not only find Cecily, but also free her from her overbearing father?

=== Enola Holmes and the Mark of The Mongoose (2023) ===
In May 1890, Enola Holmes is finally fully on her own and, no longer hiding from her older brothers Sherlock and Mycroft, attending classes and occasionally pursuing her chosen profession as a scientific perditorian, a finder of lost things and people.

Wolcott Balestier, the representative of an American book publisher, arrived in London on a singular mission to contract with English authors for their latest works. When Balestier disappears on the streets of London one day, his great friend Rudyard Kipling bursts into Enola's office looking for help in finding him. Brash and unwilling to hire a young woman, instead he turns to Sherlock Holmes. Convinced that evil has befallen Balestier, at the hands of rival American publishers who pirate the works of English authors, he sets the elder Holmes on the trail.

Enola, unwilling to defer to her brother, begins her own investigation into the disappearance of a young American man. Her inquiries lead her to the world of book publishing, where she tries to determine whether the industry is connected to his disappearance and whether he can be found and returned to his family and friends.

== Analysis ==
The Enola Holmes Mysteries has been classified as an example of neo-Victorian literature for young adults, in part due to the author's use of Victorian woman's clothes as a method to show female empowerment through the main character. According to Amy Montz, Nancy Springer rewrites the "social and personal expectations for fashion". For Montz, the corset is one of the main pieces of clothing for Victorian era stories, as "it is both public and private, masculine and feminine, utilitarian and ornamental, necessary and reviled." In the Enola Holmes series, the corset is a piece of "protection, [...] masquerade [...] and storage space," and is highlighted throughout the various books.

In a paper about Libba Bray's Gemma Doyle Trilogy and Springer's Enola Holmes Mysteries, Sonya Fritz also classifies these series as part of the neo-Victorian movement, and talks about how those stories explore the concept of girl power. For Fritz, in Springer's books the characters conform to the social norms in public, but "[b]eneath this veneer of respectability and conformity [...] is a completely different life, one filled with courage, autonomy, and action." According to Fritz, Enola is described to the reader as having an "unconventional independence" since the start of the story, where she is described as wearing her brother's old clothes, marking her as a tomboy. She also notes how, when faced with the prospect of being sent to a finishing school, Enola chooses to run away, which frames her as "a specimen of one of the feminine ideals that can be found in girl power".

The various disguises used by Enola throughout the series demonstrates the character's understanding of femininity as something "performative rather than essential," specially through her usage of the corset as a place to stash her money, or as a piece of armor. For Fritz, this subversion of female fashion as disguises or as secret communication offers "simultaneously a representation of the Victorian period and a contemporary model of girl power".

== Reception ==
The first book, The Case of the Missing Marquess, and the fifth, The Case of the Cryptic Crinoline, were nominated for the Edgar Awards for Best Juvenile Mystery in 2007 and 2010, respectively. Karen MacPherson in the Pittsburgh Post-Gazette called Enola a "highly appealing heroine". In a review for the first book, Children's Book and Play Review echoed the statement, calling Enola "a bright and endearing character". The review also praised the novel for being "fast-paced and suspenseful" as well as its integration of Victorian culture but noted that it "wrap[ped] up a bit briskly". Carthage College's Center for Children's Literature described the second book as a "solid historical mystery" with a "satisfying and surprising ending" despite being "a bit slow at the beginning".

== Adaptations ==
=== Graphic novels ===
The series has been adapted in France as graphic novels by writer and artist Séréna Blasco, then Lucie Arnoux and published by Jungle! in their collection Miss Jungle, starting in 2015. As of 2023, adaptations of each novel up to Elegant Escapade had been released. The first three graphic novels were published in the United States by IDW in individual hardcovers from 2018-2020. All six of the first group of novels have been reprinted in English by Andrews McMeel in 2022. There are three stories each, with new translations, in two paperback volumes titled Enola Holmes: The Graphic Novels.

An unrelated original story was published as the graphic novel Enola Holmes: Mycroft's Dangerous Game by Legendary Comics in 2022, credited to Nancy Springer and writer Mickey George, plus artists Cat Staggs and Giorgia Sposito.

=== Films ===
In 2018, it was announced that Millie Bobby Brown would produce and star as the title character in a film series based on the Enola Holmes books, with Harry Bradbeer directing, and Jack Thorne writing the script. Helena Bonham Carter plays Enola's mother, and Henry Cavill plays Sherlock Holmes. On April 21, 2020, Netflix bought the distribution rights to the film, as opposed to a theatrical release due to the COVID-19 pandemic. The film was released on September 23, 2020.

After the success of the first film a sequel was announced. Bradbeer created an original story based on the matchgirls' strike. Brown and Cavill reprise their roles as Enola and Sherlock. In November 2022, the sequel, Enola Holmes 2 was released on Netflix.

A third film was released on July 1, 2026. Directed by Philip Barantini and written by Jack Thorne, Enola is in Malta about to get married when Sherlock goes missing.

== Lawsuit ==
On June 23, 2020, the estate of Sir Arthur Conan Doyle brought a lawsuit in New Mexico against, among others, Nancy Springer, Legendary Pictures, PCMA Productions, and Netflix, citing both copyright and trademark infringement. This is in regard to the final ten stories produced by Doyle, which had not yet entered the public domain, although at the time of filing four actually had. The lawsuit specifically references Holmes' becoming more emotional in the final ten works, presenting a more "human" side to Sherlock, something that he was not known to present in the original works prior to the character's resurrection after The Final Problem. According to the suit, The Enola Holmes Mysteries and adaptations violate the trademark and copyright on this particular depiction of Holmes, as the stories are still in a time of transition between copyright and the public domain.

The lawsuit was dismissed with prejudice on December 18, 2020. Furthermore, the Sherlock Holmes property by Arthur Conan Doyle fully entered the public domain in the United States as of 2023, which permanently ended any possibility of copyright challenges in the future.

== See also ==
- The Boy Sherlock Holmes
- Young Sherlock Holmes (books)
- Sherlock Holmes pastiches
- Eurus Holmes – the sister of Sherlock and Mycroft in the 2010 television series Sherlock
