= Susan Wokoma =

British actress (born 1987)

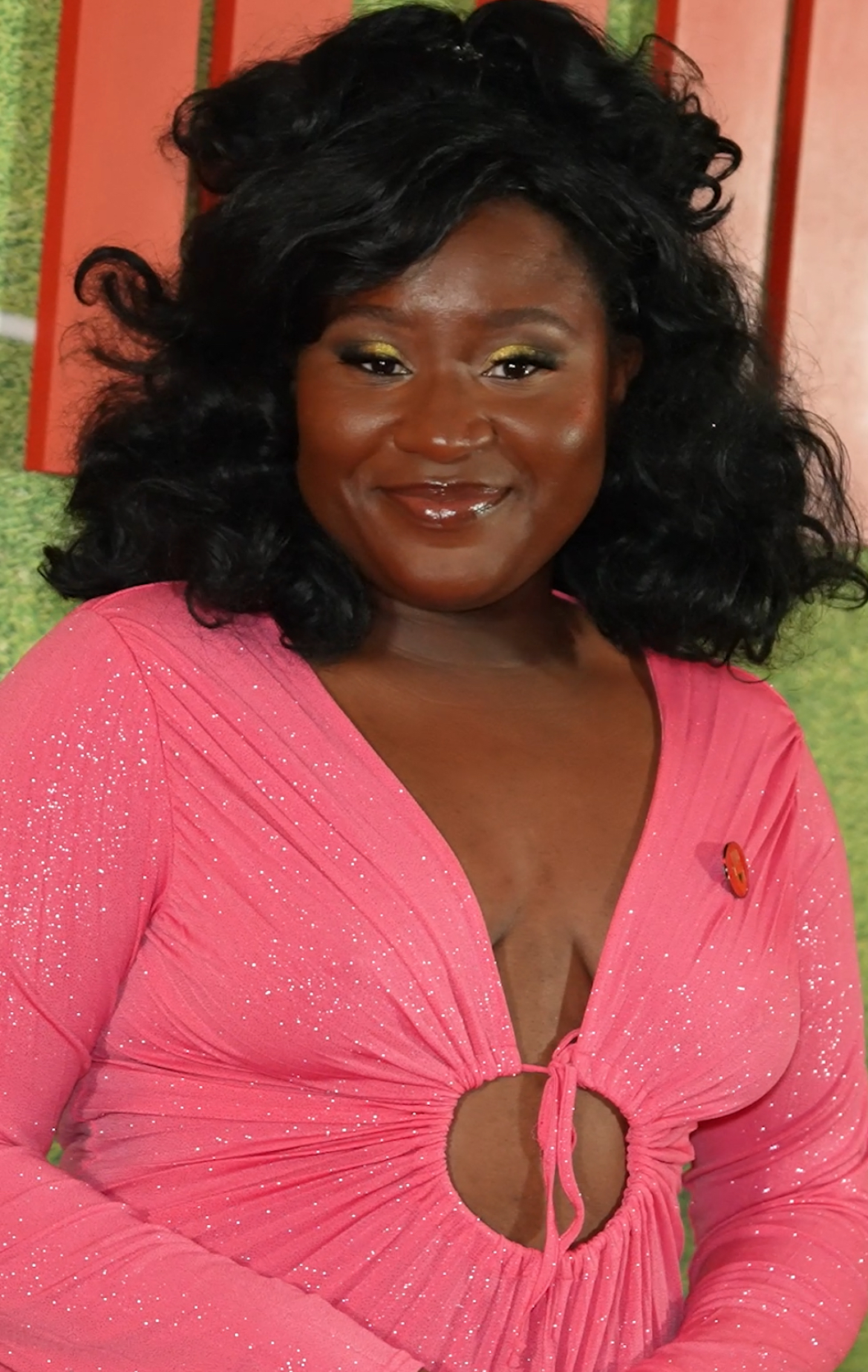
- Wokoma at the premiere of The Beautiful Game 2024
- Born: Susan Indiaba Wokoma; 31 December 1987 (age 38); Peckham, London, England
- Education: Royal Academy of Dramatic Art
- Occupation: Actor
- Years active: 2002–present

Susan Indiaba Wokoma (born 31 December 1987) is a British actress, writer and director. She is best known for her roles as Edith in the Enola Holmes films, Cynthia in Chewing Gum, Raquel in the E4/Netflix show Crazyhead, and Fola in Cheaters. Wokoma was listed as one of Europe's Forbes 30 Under 30 in 2017 and named a BAFTA Breakthrough Brit by an international jury the same year.

== Early life and education ==
Wokoma was born on 31 December 1987 in Peckham, London. Her parents are Kalabari from Rivers State in southern Nigeria. They lived on the now demolished North Peckham Estate. Her mother worked as a cleaner and her father had multiple jobs. Wokoma's father died in 2012 and her mother in 2025. Wokoma has a sister, fellow actress Emi Wokoma.

Wokoma made her television debut at the age of 14 as a participant in CBBC's Serious Jungle in 2002. She was also a member of The National Youth Theatre, making her professional acting debut in the BAFTA-winning That Summer Day.

She has a bachelor's degree in acting from the Royal Academy of Dramatic Art, graduating in 2010.

== Career ==
Since graduating, her television appearances have included Phoebe Waller-Bridge's debut television show Crashing as well as the film adaptation of Half of a Yellow Sun and The Inbetweeners 2. Her theatre work includes productions at the Royal Court, Bush Theatre, Almeida Theatre, The Royal National Theatre, Donmar Warehouse and St. Ann's Warehouse in New York. In 2017, she made her West End theatre debut alongside Martin Freeman and Tamsin Greig in the premiere of the Olivier Award-winning comedy Labour of Love by James Graham at the Noël Coward Theatre in London.

In 2017, Wokoma won the RTS Best On-Screen Performance award for Crazyhead. In 2016, she won Best Supporting Actor at the BBC Audio Drama Awards for her performance in the radio adaptation of Marie NDiaye's Three Strong Women. Wokoma is the voice of Princess Talanji in World of Warcraft: Battle for Azeroth, the seventh expansion of the popular World of Warcraft game. Wokoma wrote, starred and associate produced the Sky comedy short Love The Sinner. Love The Sinner went on in 2019 to be screened at the BFI London Film Festival and was longlisted for the British Independent Film Awards in the British Short Film category.

Wokoma co-wrote (alongside Shaun Pye) an episode of Romesh Ranganathan’s sitcom The Reluctant Landlord (Series 2), also for Sky.

In 2019, she starred in the Channel 4 and IFC comedy Year of the Rabbit alongside Matt Berry and Freddie Fox. In June and July 2019, she played Bottom in A Midsummer Night's Dream at Regent's Park Open Air Theatre in London. The Daily Telegraph said of her performance: "All are terrific and Susan Wokoma sheer bliss, delivering one of the most endearing and effortlessly funny Bottoms I've ever seen." In October 2020, Wokoma starred in the Amazon Studios comedy Truth Seekers and joined the cast of the feature film adaptation of Enola Holmes alongside Millie Bobby Brown, Henry Cavill and Helena Bonham Carter. Wokoma had a leading role in the BBC drama Cheaters. In May 2022, Wokoma started directing her first feature film, Three Weeks, which she also wrote and is starring in.

In 2022, Wokoma voiced Lilith in the British adult animated short film Lilith & Eve.

Wokoma was a contestant on the 16th series of Taskmaster, which started airing in September 2023. She came third.

Her directorial debut Dark Skin Bruises Differently premiered at Raindance Film Festival in 2025 and was part of the short film programme at the BFI London Film Festival in the same year.

== Filmography ==
Key
†	Denotes projects that have not yet been released

=== Film ===
Year	Title	Role	Notes
2013	Half of a Yellow Sun	Amala	
2013	Alpha: Omega	Fighter	Short film
2014	The Inbetweeners 2	Della	
2015	Burn Burn Burn	Megan	
2016	Kid Gloves	Lucy	Short film
2018	Susan Wokoma's Sky Comedy Short: ‘Love The Sinner’	Ann / Adult Joannah	Short film; also writer
2019	The Ghost and the House of Truth	Bola Ogun	
2020	Night Bus	Natasha	Short film
2020	Enola Holmes	Edith	
2022	The House	Rosa	
2022	Save the Cinema	Dolly	
2022	Lilith & Eve	Lilith	Short film
2022	The Loneliest Boy in the World	Susanne	
2022	Enola Holmes 2	Edith	
2024	The Beautiful Game	Protasia	
2024	And Mrs	Ruth	
2025	Dark Skin Bruises Differently	Ms Lawson	Short Film; also writer and director
2026	The End of It	Jemina	
2026	Enola Holmes 3	Edith	
2027	Narnia: The Magician's Nephew		Post-production

=== Television ===
Year	Title	Role	Notes
2006	That Summer Day	Marie	TV film
2011	Holby City	Elsa Eze	Episode: "China in Your Hands"
2011	Doctors	Jen Oldham	Episode: "Get Smart"
2011	Hotel Trubble	Daisy	Recurring role; 5 episodes
2013	Misfits	Roz	Series 5, Episode 4
2015	Brain Freeze	Ms Hucklebuck	Series regular; 31 episodes
2015	Uncle	Cash Pig Cashier	Series 2, Episode 6
2015	Bluestone 42	Jasmine	Recurring role; 3 episodes
2015	The Last Hours of Laura K	Jess Manning	TV film
2015	Horrible Science	Dr. Sensible	Series regular; 10 episodes
2015–2017	Chewing Gum	Cynthia	Series regular; 10 episodes
2016	Crashing	Jessica	Recurring role; 3 episodes
2016	Crazyhead	Raquel	Series regular; 6 episodes
2016	Our Ex-Wife	Allison	TV film
2017	Zapped	Rina	Episode: "The Party"
2017–2019	Porters	Frankie	Series regular; 9 episodes
2018	To Provide All People	Junior Doctor	TV film
2019	Year of the Rabbit	Mabel Wisbech	Series regular; 6 episodes
2019	Dark Money	Sabrina Stevens	Miniseries; 4 episodes
2019	Super Simple Love Story		Episode: "Pilot"
2020	Truth Seekers	Helen	Series regular; 8 episodes
2020	A Response to Your Message	Narrator	TV film
2022	Toast of London	Nina Armenian	Episode: "LA Story"
2022	Rules of the Game	DI Eve Preston	Recurring role; 4 episodes
2022	Peacock	Liz	Recurring role; 3 episodes
2022–2024	Cheaters	Fola	Series regular; 26 episodes
2023	Teenage Euthanasia	Conceived in Orlando Member #3 (voice)	Episode: "Sexually Educated"
2023	Tabby McTat	Sock (voice)	TV film
2023	Taskmaster	Herself	Series 16
2024	Inside No. 9	Cleo / Party Guest	Series 9 episode 1: Boo to a Goose; Series 9 episode 6: Plodding On
2025	RuPaul's Drag Race UK	Guest judge	Series 7
2026	Pointless	Herself (co-host)	11 episodes
2027	Wahala	Ronke	6 episodes

=== Video games ===
Year	Title	Role	Notes
2018	World of Warcraft: Battle for Azeroth	Princess Talanji	
2027	Fable	Arden the Cobbler	

=== Audio ===
Year	Title	Role	Notes
2021	Whistle Through the Shamrocks	Eloisa Louisa (voice)	5 episodes

== See also ==
- List of British actors
