= Enola Holmes 3 =

2026 film by Philip Barantini

- Release poster
- Directed by: Philip Barantini
- Screenplay by: Jack Thorne
- Based on: The Enola Holmes Mysteries by Nancy Springer
- Produced by: Mary Parent; Alex Garcia; Ali Mendes; Millie Bobby Brown; Robert Brown; Michael Dreyer; Jack Thorne
- Starring: Millie Bobby Brown; Louis Partridge; Himesh Patel; Sharon Duncan-Brewster; Henry Cavill; Helena Bonham Carter
- Cinematography: Matthew Lewis
- Edited by: Tommy Boulding
- Music by: Aaron May; David Ridley
- Production companies: Legendary Pictures; PCMA Productions
- Distributed by: Netflix
- Release date: July 1, 2026
- Running time: 108 minutes
- Countries: United Kingdom; United States
- Language: English

Enola Holmes 3 is a 2026 mystery film and the sequel to the 2022 film Enola Holmes 2, which stars Millie Bobby Brown reprising her role as the title character, the sister of the famous Victorian-era detective Sherlock Holmes. The film also stars Louis Partridge, Himesh Patel, Sharon Duncan-Brewster, Henry Cavill, and Helena Bonham Carter in supporting roles. The film is directed by Philip Barantini--making this the first film in the series not directed by Harry Bradbeer. The script, written by Jack Thorne, is not based on any storyline from the book series The Enola Holmes Mysteries by Nancy Springer and is an original story. It follows Enola as she is in Malta about to be married to Tewkesbury, when Sherlock goes missing, leaving a mystery to be solved.

The film was released on July 1, 2026. The film received mixed reviews from critics.

== Plot ==
Enola Holmes, the sister of famous detective Sherlock Holmes, arrives in Malta with Tewkesbury for their wedding. Tewkesbury's late father, Lord Peter, served in Malta during the British occupation, and his mother believes it is the most meaningful place for the ceremony. Sherlock attends despite openly opposing the union, believing Enola is sacrificing independence for social status as a Lady. Enola insists she can be both a wife and detective.

Sherlock is secretly working on another case but disapears before he can explain it to Enola. When a dying British soldier mutters what sounds like "wrath", deduces he actually said the surname of Professor Adeline Rathe. She finds a torn piece of an expensive dress in Sherlock's room and tracks the owner through Valletta. Before she can be questioned, the woman is shot by a sniper and warns Enola she'll be next before dying. The assassin eludes Enola's pursuit. Enola discovers the assassin was Professor Moriarty, who escaped prison and is using Professor Adeline Rathe as an alias. Sherlock has been imprisoned alongside Tewkesbury's mother.

Moriarty explains she influenced Lady Tewkesbury into choosing Malta for the wedding as part of an elaborate trap for Enola. Sherlock's kidnapping is simply bait to lure her into solving a puzzle. Enola accepts the challenge and teams up with Dr. John Watson, who has recently entered Sherlock's life, and Maltese freedom fighter Mikiel Mizzi. Their investigation uncovers a conspiracy dating back to the Battle of Khost in Afghanistan when British officers stole a vast sum of Afghan gold and secretly transported it to Malta. Tewkesbury's father had been involved in transporting the treasure, and his war medals become one of the crucial clues when Enola realises a masked man wearing identical medals is actually Brigadier Sampson, Tewkesbury's godfather and his father’s closest military friend. Sampson colluded with the British governor and other senior officers to cover up the theft of the Afghan gold for decades.

Enola follows Sherlock’s coded clues to a hidden cave containing the treasure chest. Knowing Moriarty manipulated her into finding it, she expects an ambush. When Moriarty’s hired Maltese soldiers surround Enola and Watson as they retrieve the chest, Tewkesbury and Mikiel arrive with Maltese rebels, allowing Enola to escape with the gold. Moriarty flees on horseback, leading Enola to the location where Sherlock and Lady Tewkesbury are being held. Enola overpowers Moriarty in a fight while Sherlock, driven mad by torture, is tempted to kill her. Enola persuades him not to become a murderer and they arrest Moriarty instead.

Brigadier Sampson confesses his role in the conspiracy and is arrested with the other corrupt British officers. Enola and Sherlock ensure the treasure returns to Afghanistan, acknowledging that it never belonged to Britain. Mikiel believes the scandal will strengthen Malta's campaign for independence.

Sherlock apologises to Enola for doubting her and concedes she's become his equal as a detective. Deeply disturbed by his father's involvement in British imperial crimes, Tewkesbury renounces his aristocratic title and seat in the House of Lords, choosing to live under his birth name, Earnest Augustus Tebbity-Gore. Enola decides to remain Enola Holmes, keeping her own identity after marriage. They marry in a small clifftop ceremony officiated by Eudoria Holmes.

== Cast ==
- Millie Bobby Brown as Enola Eudoria Holmes, the youngest of the Holmes siblings a detective in her own right. Enola occasionally breaks the fourth wall and talks directly to the audience
- Henry Cavill as Sherlock Holmes, a renowned private investigator and Enola's older brother
- Helena Bonham Carter as Eudoria Holmes, Enola and Sherlock's mother, who is a militant suffragette
- Louis Partridge as Tewkesbury
- Himesh Patel as Dr. Watson, Sherlock's friend and confidant
- Sharon Duncan-Brewster as Moriarty, a criminal mastermind
- Hattie Morahan as Lady Tewkesbury, mother of Tewkesbury
- Susan Wokoma as Edith, Eudoria's confidante and Enola's mentor who shows up to Enola and Tewkesbury's wedding
- Joe Azzopardi as Mikiel, a member of the Partito Anti-Riformista
- Nicholas Aaron as Sergeant Nicholas Smith
- Michela Farrugia as Crista
- David Sterne as Coachman Eric
- Jason Watkins as Brigadier Sampson, the godfather of Tewkesbury who knew his father
- Paul Cawley as the British Governor of Malta
- Myron Ellul as Sargeant Indri
- Robbie O'Neill as Corporal Malick
- Stephen Chance as a senior officer
- Nicolette Yardley-Moore as Baroness Guilford

== Production ==
In November 2024, it was announced that a third Enola Holmes film was in development, with Philip Barantini attached to direct and Millie Bobby Brown reprising her role as Enola Holmes, as well as co-producing. It was described to be darker and more mature than the previous films. In April 2025, Louis Partridge, Himesh Patel, Henry Cavill, Helena Bonham Carter, and Sharon Duncan-Brewster were confirmed to be reprising their roles from the previous films.

Jack Thorne again wrote the original screenplay, and after exploring voting rights, and worker's rights in the previous films, chose to look at British colonial history. Thorne also wanted to do something different for the new director Phil Barantini, and Millie Bobbie Brown as an adult woman. The Mediterranean island of Malta was under British control from 1800 onwards, and as the Crown Colony of Malta was the headquarters of the British fleet. The opening of the Suez Canal in 1869, made it an important gateway to the east and British India. Thorne created the fictional "Battle of Khost", in reference to the British Invasions of Afghanistan and inspired by the attack and plunder of the fortress of Bala Hissar, Kabul.

Principal photography began on 10 April 2025 in Shepperton Studios, England and in Valletta and Mdina, Malta. On 27 June 2025, Millie Bobby Brown announced that filming had wrapped.

=== Music ===
Aaron May and David Ridley composed the score for the film. They replaced Daniel Pemberton, who scored the first two films in the series.

== Release ==
Enola Holmes 3 was released by Netflix on July 1, 2026. It had a bit of a slower start with viewers than the previous film in the franchise. Enola Holmes 3 gained 20.7 million views in 5 days while Enola Holmes 2 hit that number in only 3.

== Critical response ==
On Rotten Tomatoes the film has a 65% rating based on reviews from 79 critics. The website’s consensus reads: "Despite a muddled story and diminished spark, Enola Holmes 3 succeeds thanks to Millie Bobby Brown's winning performance and some lively action." On Metacritic it has a weighted average score of 58 out of 100 based on reviews from 17 critics, indicating "mixed or average" reviews.

Frank Scheck of The Hollywood Reporter gave it a positive review and wrote: "Brown has matured nicely in the role, exhibiting a newfound steeliness and steadily increasing comic chops." He is critical of the pacing at times, but concludes "the film redeems itself with its strong anti-colonialist message that provides a surprisingly serious element to the otherwise escapist goings-on." Natalia Winkelman of The New York Times praises Brown for her performance saying she "shines, bringing a buoyancy and bite that makes the movie immensely more watchable than comparable entries into the young-adult action-adventure genre."

Benjamin Lee of The Guardian gave the film 2 out of 5 stars, describing the mystery as "far too plodding and far too simple to ever really grab us" and remarking that "it's at least shorter than the last two films ... but in a way that feels more down to a lack of new ideas and general enthusiasm from those involved." Regarding Brown's performance he stated "there's just not enough natural, easy charm and the star, like many maturing child actors before her, can't figure out how big or small to go with her adult reactions, making something buoyant and breezy look far too much like hard work." He summarised the film as "an often thoughtful yet ultimately lesser threequel". Kate Erbland of IndieWire gives the film a mixed review, and notes that despite dealing with sometimes challenging subject matter the film has a "surprising lack of verve around it makes it feel out of step with the rest of the series" and wishes for the series to "Let Enola really grow up, and get as complicated (and clever) as that requires. We're ready for the next level, because this particular mystery is not it."
