= Enola Holmes 2 =

2022 film by Harry Bradbeer

- Release poster
- Directed by: Harry Bradbeer
- Screenplay by: Jack Thorne
- Story by: Harry Bradbeer; Jack Thorne
- Based on: The Enola Holmes Mysteries by Nancy Springer
- Produced by: Mary Parent; Alex Garcia; Ali Mendes; Millie Bobby Brown; Robert Brown
- Starring: Millie Bobby Brown; Henry Cavill; Helena Bonham Carter
- Cinematography: Giles Nuttgens
- Edited by: Adam Bosman
- Music by: Daniel Pemberton
- Production companies: Legendary Pictures; PCMA Productions
- Distributed by: Netflix
- Release date: November 4, 2022
- Running time: 129 minutes
- Countries: United Kingdom; United States
- Language: English

Enola Holmes 2 is a 2022 mystery film and the sequel to the 2020 film Enola Holmes, both of which star Millie Bobby Brown as the title character, the teenage sister of the already-famous Victorian-era detective Sherlock Holmes (portrayed by Henry Cavill). The film is directed by Harry Bradbeer from an original screenplay by Jack Thorne. In addition to Brown and Cavill, Louis Partridge, Susie Wokoma, Adeel Akhtar, and Helena Bonham Carter reprise their supporting roles while David Thewlis and Sharon Duncan-Brewster join the cast.

Unlike the film's predecessor, it does not adapt one of Nancy Springer's The Enola Holmes Mysteries novels and instead takes real-life inspiration from the matchgirls' strike.

Filming began in Autumn 2021 and ended in January 2022. Enola Holmes 2 was released on Netflix on November 4, 2022. The film received positive reviews from critics and topped Netflix's viewership charts in 93 countries. A third film was released on July 1, 2026.

== Plot ==
Enola Holmes opens her own detective agency, but is not taken seriously unlike her famous detective brother Sherlock Holmes. A factory girl named Bessie asks Enola to help find her missing sister Sarah Chapman. Bessie takes Enola to the match factory, which is apparently experiencing a deadly typhus epidemic, and encounters Mae, who worked alongside the sisters.

Enola follows Mae to the Paragon Theatre where Mae and Sarah work as dancers. She finds a poem written to Sarah by a secret lover. On her way home, Enola comes across a drunken Sherlock and brings him home to 221B Baker Street. He is struggling to solve his latest case involving the blackmail of government officials, but he cannot trace the owner of the accounts where the money is sent.

Enola deduces that the poem is a code leading to a home in Whitechapel. There, she finds Mae dying of a stab wound. Enola discovers a piece of sheet music in her dress but is interrupted by Superintendent Grail who accuses her of murder. She escapes to Sherlock's flat and deduces that Sarah's lover will be at a ball hosted by the Lyon family.

There, Enola meets Cicely, a friendly noblewoman, and Mira Troy, secretary to Treasury Minister Lord Charles McIntyre. She reunites with Tewkesbury, who teaches her how to dance so she can find an opportunity to get closer to William Lyon, the son of the match factory's owner and Sarah's lover. Meanwhile, Sherlock pieces together a message in the blackmail scheme from its mastermind Moriarty. Enola is arrested by Grail before she can speak with William, but Sherlock enlists their mother Eudoria and her fellow radical suffragette Edith to break Enola out of prison.

While visiting Tewkesbury, Enola realizes that Sarah is Cicely and that she, Mae, and William had discovered that white phosphorus, not typhus, was killing the workers, so were planning to expose it. On the way to the factory, Enola teaches Tewkesbury how to fight, the two confess their love for each other and share a kiss. At the factory, they meet Sherlock and find William dead with a corner of the sheet music. The three deduce Lord McIntyre had struck a deal with William's father to use cheap phosphorus to increase profit.

The group heads to the Paragon after realizing the full sheet music was actually a map of the theatre. There, Sarah confirms Enola's findings and admits she and William needed Tewkesbury's help to expose McIntyre. Grail and several policemen arrive, holding Bessie hostage.

However, Bessie breaks free and a fight ensues, resulting in Enola defeating Grail and causing him to fall to his death. Lord McIntyre arrives with Lestrade. He burns the evidence of the dealings and attempts to have Sarah arrested, but Sherlock and Enola deduce that Mira Troy is Moriarty and is responsible for the blackmail and murder. Mira is taken into custody.

Sarah, Bessie, and Enola inform the factory's match girls of the events and convince them to strike, McIntyre is arrested with Tewkesbury's help, and Moriarty escapes police custody. Enola sets up a new office at Edith's shop. Tewkesbury has begun courting Enola in earnest and he invites Enola to a ball.

== Cast ==
- Millie Bobby Brown as Enola Holmes, the youngest of the Holmes siblings who has started her own detective agency. Enola occasionally breaks the fourth wall and talks directly to the audience.
  - Sofia Stavrinou as young Enola
- Henry Cavill as Sherlock Holmes, a renowned private investigator and Enola's brother
  - John Parshall as young Sherlock
- David Thewlis as Grail, a corrupt police superintendent.
- Louis Partridge as Tewkesbury, a friend of Enola who has become a member of the House of Lords.
- Susie Wokoma as Edith, a friend of Enola and Sherlock who runs a secret martial arts class.
- Adeel Akhtar as Inspector Lestrade, a police inspector who assists Sherlock.
- Sharon Duncan-Brewster as Mira Troy, the secretary to Lord McIntyre.
- Helena Bonham Carter as Eudoria Holmes, the mother of Enola and Sherlock.
- Himesh Patel as Dr. Watson
- Hannah Dodd as Sarah Chapman, a missing matchstick factory worker who poses as a friendly noblewoman named Cicely.
- Abbie Hern as Mae, a co-worker of Sarah at the matchstick factory.
- Róisín Monaghan as Hilda Lyon, the wife of Henry.
- Gabriel Tierney as William Lyon, the boyfriend of Sarah.
- Catriona Chandler as Agatha Gowerdale
- David Westhead as Henry Lyon, the proprietor of the matchstick factory and the father of William.
- Tim McMullan as Charles McIntyre, the Chancellor of the Exchequer.
- Serrana Su-Ling Bliss as Bessie Chapman, the fictional sister of Sarah Chapman. Eleanor Dang serves as Bessie's picture double.
- Tony Lucken as Sergeant Beeston, a corrupt police sergeant who works for Grail.
- Stefan Peterman as a young Mycroft Holmes, the brother of Sherlock and Enola.
- Lee Boardman as Mr. Bill Crouch, Sarah and Mae's supervisor at the matchstick factory.

== Production ==
In September 2020, co-producer and star Millie Bobby Brown and director Harry Bradbeer acknowledged their intentions to develop a sequel to Enola Holmes. The story is an original story based on the real 1888 matchgirls' strike and the life of labour activist Sarah Chapman. Bradbeer thought it was an inspiring feminist tale, and it showed the theme of working together — "Enola, to advance, has to work with others and not just be reliant on herself. It's a story that goes from 'I' to 'we', and that is a story of sisterhood."

In April 2021, Enola Holmes 2 was reportedly in development, with Brown and Cavill reprising their roles as Enola Holmes and Sherlock Holmes. Sam Claflin was unable to return as Mycroft Holmes due to scheduling conflicts, though Mycroft's absence allowed them to concentrate more on Sherlock. In May 2021, the project was officially confirmed by Netflix. Brown was reportedly paid $10 million for her role, making it the highest upfront salary for an actor under the age of 20 as of the release of the film.

Production and filming began in Autumn 2021. Scenes were filmed in Hull in October 2021, and Cavill wrapped filming that November. Filming concluded on January 7, 2022.

== Reception ==
=== Audience viewership ===
Enola Holmes 2 debuted at number 1 on Netflix's global weekly viewership with 64.08 million hours streamed across 93 countries. The next week the film stayed at the number 1 spot with 62.860 million hours. Interest in the first film Enola Holmes generated another 9.64 million hours viewed for the first week of the sequel release.

=== Critical response ===
On the review aggregator website Rotten Tomatoes, 93% of 104 critics' reviews are positive, with an average rating of 7/10. The website's consensus reads: "Building on its predecessor with boisterously entertaining flair, Enola Holmes 2 solves the mystery of how to make a satisfying sequel – and makes it look positively elementary." Metacritic gave the film a weighted average score of 64 out of 100, based on 26 critics, indicating "generally favorable" reviews.

Beandrea July of The New York Times wrote "One can't help but cheer on this Y.A. feminist tale as a welcome addition to the Sherlock Holmes universe." Lovia Gyarkye of The Hollywood Reporter called it "a serviceable sequel". Gyarkye praises the meticulous production and costume design but is critical of the narrative as "The 1888 match girl strike, which was a process of community building, a focused effort on we, gets repackaged as a lesson in one voice leading the masses."

Benjamin Lee of The Guardian gave it 3 out of 5 and wrote: "An equally boisterous romp that's equally as hard to remember once it's over but one that should keep its many fans engaged enough to warrant further sequels." Robbie Collin of The Daily Telegraph gave it 2 out of 5. He found the film less charming than its predecessor and was critical of "the overall aura of cheapness", from the dreary looking scenes to the basic fight scenes.

=== Accolades ===
Millie Bobby Brown won the award for Favorite Movie Actress at the 2023 Kids' Choice Awards. Consolata Boyle also won Best Costume Design at the 19th Irish Film & Television Awards.

== Sequel ==
In November 2023, Netflix revealed that a screenplay for a third Enola Holmes film was in the works. Netflix Films chairman Scott Stuber said the streamer is very proud of their "homegrown star" Millie Bobby Brown, and they are excited to continue telling Enola's story.

The third film was announced in November 2024, with Philip Barantini taking over as director. Brown, Partridge, Cavill, Bonham Carter, Patel, and Duncan-Brewster reprise their roles, while Jack Thorne returns as screenwriter. Filming began in April 2025, and completed on 27 June.

Enola Holmes 3 was released on July 1, 2026.
