= Charles Sauria =

French chemist

- Born: 25 April 1812; Poligny, Jura, France
- Died: 22 August 1895 (aged 83); Saint-Lothain, France
- Known for: Invention of phosphorus-based matches
- Scientific career
- Fields: Chemistry

Marc Charles Sauria (25 April 1812 – 22 August 1895) was a French chemist credited for inventing phosphorus-based matches in 1830–1831.

Several events are believed to have led Sauria to his discovery, including the hydrogen lighter introduced in 1827 by Joseph Louis Gay-Lussac and the demonstration by his chemistry professor Nicolet where a powder mixture of potassium chlorate and sulfur was detonated by a blow. During a long series of experiments, Sauria went on to add white phosphorus that helped ignite the mixture by friction. He finalized the invention by adding gum arabic to hold the powders together, and dipping pieces of wood into it.

Sauria was a poor student at the time; however, Nicolet communicated his invention to German industrialist Friedrich Kammerer who had patented it and used it in mass production of matches. The British chemist John Walker had introduced a very similar match some five years earlier, where he used antimony sulfide instead of white phosphorus. However, the phosphorus matches became more popular, mostly because of the reduced smell of sulfur, and quickly replaced those made by Walker. Around the time of Sauria's death, some 3 trillion of white phosphorus matches per year were produced worldwide. However, white phosphorus was soon proven to be toxic and banned by the international Berne Convention in 1906.
