= Muath =

Muath, Muadh, Muad, Muaz, Moaz, Moaaz, Moaath or similar can mean: مُعاذ, which is in Arabic masculine given name that means the protected. Notable people with the name include:

== People ==
=== Given name ===
- Moaaz Alaaeldin (born 2003), Egyptian footballer
- Moaaz Mohamed Ibrahim (born 1999), Qatari athlete
- Moaz El Henawy (born 1990), Egyptian footballer
- Moaz al-Khatib (born 1960), Syrian politician
- Moaz Abu Taha (died 2025), Palestinian freelance video journalist
- Muad Mohamad Zaki (born 1982), politician and businessman
- Muadh ibn Jabal (603–639), Islamic scholar
- Muath Afaneh (born 1991), Jordanian footballer
- Muath Amarneh, Palestinian journalist
- Muath Faqeehi (born 2002), Saudi footballer
- Muath al-Kasasbeh (1988–2015), Jordanian fighter pilot
- Muath Mahmoud (born 1993), Jordanian footballer
