= Berne Convention (disambiguation) =

Berne (or Bern) Convention may refer to:

- Berne Convention for the Protection of Literary and Artistic Works
- Berne Convention on the Conservation of European Wildlife and Natural Habitats (Council of Europe), on nature conservation in Europe
- The Treaty of Bern, establishing the General Postal Union
- Berne Convention (1906) on the prohibition of white phosphorus in the manufacture of matches.
- The convention which established the standard loading gauge for continental Europe which came into force in 1914.
