= Complaints to the International Criminal Court =

The International Criminal Court's founding treaty, the Rome Statute, provides that individuals or organizations may submit information on crimes within the jurisdiction of the Court. These submissions are referred to as "communications to the International Criminal Court".

As of end September 2010, the Office of the Prosecutor had received 8,874 communications about alleged crimes. After initial review, 4,002 of these communications were dismissed as "manifestly outside the jurisdiction of the Court". The ICC has opened investigations in Afghanistan (twice), Bangladesh/Myanmar, Burundi, the Central African Republic (twice), Côte d'Ivoire, Darfur in Sudan, the Democratic Republic of the Congo, Georgia, Kenya, Libya, Lithuania/Belarus, Mali, Palestine, the Philippines, Uganda, Ukraine, and Venezuela I. The Office of the Prosecutor carried out and closed preliminary investigations in Bolivia; Colombia; Congo II; Gabon; Guinea; Honduras; Iraq/the United Kingdom; registered vessels of Comoros, Greece, and Cambodia; South Korea; and Venezuela II. An ongoing preliminary examination is being carried out in the situation in Nigeria.

Some of the communications received by the Prosecutor alleged that crimes had been committed on the territory of states parties to the Court, or by nationals of states parties: in such cases, the Court may automatically exercise jurisdiction. Other communications concerned conduct outside the jurisdiction of states parties: in these cases, the Court can only act if it has received a referral by the United Nations Security Council or a declaration by the relevant state allowing the Court to exercise jurisdiction.

Communications from individuals and organisations should not be confused with referrals from states parties or the United Nations Security Council.

== Procedure ==
The court's founding treaty, the Rome Statute, provides that individuals or organizations may submit to the Prosecutor information on crimes within the jurisdiction of the Court. These submissions are referred to as "communications". Before an investigation is opened, each communication is subject to three levels of analysis: initial review, basic reporting and intensive analysis.

=== Initial review ===
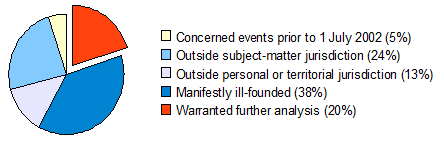
Analysis of the 1732 communications received before 1 February 2006. After initial review, 80% of the communications were dismissed as "manifestly outside the jurisdiction of the Court"; only 20% warranted further analysis.

Every time a complaint is received, the Prosecutor must "analyse the seriousness of the information received" and decide whether there is a reasonable basis to open an investigation. The process begins with an initial review, during which many of the communications received are dismissed as "manifestly outside the jurisdiction of the Court". Of the communications received before 1 February 2006, 80% were dismissed for the following reasons:

- 5% concerned events prior to 1 July 2002. The court can only investigate crimes committed on or after that date.
- 24% concerned allegations "manifestly outside the subject-matter jurisdiction of the Court". The court can only prosecute three types of crime: genocide, crimes against humanity, and war crimes. Communications have been received about such topics as immigration issues, medical negligence, social security and pension complaints, and employment law. The court also received communications about the crime of aggression, which became a crime under the jurisdiction for the court on 17 July 2018.
- 13% concerned crimes that were "manifestly outside the personal or territorial jurisdiction of the Court". The Court can generally only prosecute crimes committed on the territory of, or by nationals of, states parties, and crimes referred by the United Nations Security Council.
- 38% of communications were "manifestly ill-founded because they faltered on multiple jurisdictional grounds or otherwise did not provide a basis for analysis. Examples include general conspiracy claims without specific details; general concerns about local or national politics; or communications failing to provide facts susceptible to analysis."

=== Analysis and investigation ===
Once it has been determined that a communication is not manifestly outside the court's jurisdiction, the situation is subject to "basic reporting". This involves "simple factual and legal analysis, drawing on communications, referrals, and readily available public information". It was reported that between June 2003 and February 2006, 23 situations had been subject to basic reporting.

Where warranted, a situation may then be subject to "intensive analysis". This involves collecting detailed information from open sources; conducting systematic crime analysis; examining factors such as gravity, complementarity and the interests of justice; seeking additional information; and, in advanced cases, planning for potential investigation. As of February 2006, 10 situations had been subject to intensive analysis; as of August 2008, the situations under analysis included Afghanistan, Chad, Colombia, Côte d'Ivoire, Georgia and Kenya.

In deciding whether to open a formal investigation, the Prosecutor must consider four factors:

- whether there is a reasonable basis to believe that a crime within the jurisdiction of the Court has been committed;
- the gravity of the crimes;
- complementarity with national proceedings; and
- interests of justice.

== Communications received ==
As of end September 2010, the Office of the Prosecutor had received 8,874 communications about alleged crimes. After initial review, 4,002 of these communications were dismissed as “manifestly outside the jurisdiction of the Court”. Communications were received from individuals or groups in at least 103 different countries but, as of 1 February 2006, 60% of the communications originated in just four countries: the United States, the United Kingdom, France and Germany.

The situations listed below have been cited in the media as where communications have been submitted to the court.

=== Communications concerning states parties ===
As of July 2012, 121 countries are states parties to the Court.

==== Afghanistan ====
Amnesty International and Human Rights Watch have both accused the Taliban of deliberately targeting civilians in Afghanistan, including teachers and aid workers. Allegations have also been made of torture and prisoner abuse at the United States army base at Bagram Air Base and by Afghan government ministers who were former warlords. In April 2008, the Prosecutor confirmed he was undertaking an analysis of the situation there. Speaking in September 2009, he said he was investigating the Taliban, al-Qaeda and troops from the International Security Assistance Force. Allegations had included torture, "massive attacks" and excessive "collateral damage" and information has been obtained from NGOs operating there.

==== Australia ====
In May 2014 immigration lawyer Tracie Aylmer lodged a complaint against Australian Prime Minister, Tony Abbott and others, in relation to Australia's treatment of asylum seekers. Ms Aylmer alleged Australia's policies violate Article 17(2) of the Rome Statute and that the Australian Government was committing atrocities in breach of Article 7 (Crimes Against Humanity) of the convention. Australian Senator Andrew Wilkie made a similar formal request that the ICC investigate these matters in October 2014. These claims are arguably supported by United Nations special rapporteur on torture Juan Mendez who found that "Australia has violated the right of the asylum seekers, including children, to be free from torture or cruel, inhuman or degrading treatment" Over the course of 2015 a review into offshore detention and a Senate inquiry provided additional evidence of abuse. While the ICC initially declared in September 2014 that "the allegations appear to fall outside the jurisdiction of the Court" as of January 2015, the ICC was reviewing additional information.

==== Burundi ====
In February 2005 the United Nations Secretary General said that three parties to the civil war in Burundi (a state party of the court) were using child soldiers or committing war crimes against children:

- The Party for the Liberation of the Hutu People of Agathon Rwasa, which was responsible for serious violations including the killing and maiming of children and attacking schools
- The National Council for the Defense of Democracy of Leonard Nyangoma
- The National Council for the Defense of Democracy-Forces for the Defense of Democracy of the current President of Burundi, Pierre Nkurunziza

The Chief Prosecutor has not announced whether he will formally decide to open an investigation into this matter.

==== Colombia ====
In February 2005 the United Nations Secretary General said that three parties to the armed conflict in Colombia (a state party of the court, but which has temporarily opted out of war crimes jurisdiction, for up to seven years) were using child soldiers or committing war crimes against children:

- The United Self-Defence Forces of Colombia (AUC)
- The National Liberation Army (ELN)
- The Revolutionary Armed Forces of Colombia (FARC)

In April 2006, the UN High Commissioner for Human Rights office in Colombia said that FARC's attacks on civilians were war crimes within the jurisdiction of the ICC.

FIDH has called on the court to investigate the AUC for crimes against humanity.

During the 2008 South American diplomatic crisis, the Colombian President Álvaro Uribe called on the court to prosecute Venezuelan President Hugo Chávez for financing FARC's "genocidal" actions.

The Prosecutor has confirmed that the situation in Colombia is under analysis.

==== Comoros ====
On May 14, 2013, the government of the Comoros, represented by a Turkish law firm, filed a complaint demanding to investigate the loss of life on the ship Mavi Marmara when that ship was stopped by Israeli army authorities en route to the Gaza Strip. As a result, ICC prosecutor has decided to open a preliminary investigation into that case.

==== Gambia ====
The Commonwealth Human Rights Initiative stated in September 2007 that they would make a complaint to the court concerning 44 Ghanaians who were allegedly executed in 2005 on the orders of the President of the Gambia, Yahya Jammeh after being accused of planning a coup against him.

==== Georgia ====
A complaint has been received alleging that ethnic cleansing has been carried out by the Abkhazian government (not legally part of Georgia, a state party of the court) against ethnic Georgians. The Georgian state Minister for Conflict Resolution agreed that "human rights violations as well as crimes against humanity committed during the Georgian-Abkhaz conflict are difficult to dispute". The court has stated in a letter to the complainant that an investigation committee started looking into the case in 2004 and requested further information. However, a formal investigation has not yet been opened. The court only has jurisdiction over events that have taken place since its founding in July 2002.

In September 2009, the Prosecutor confirmed that he was gathering information about possible war crimes committed during the 2008 South Ossetia war.

==== Honduras ====
In November 2010 the Prosecutor confirmed that he had started preliminary investigations into events surrounding the 2009 Honduran coup d'état.

==== Iraq ====
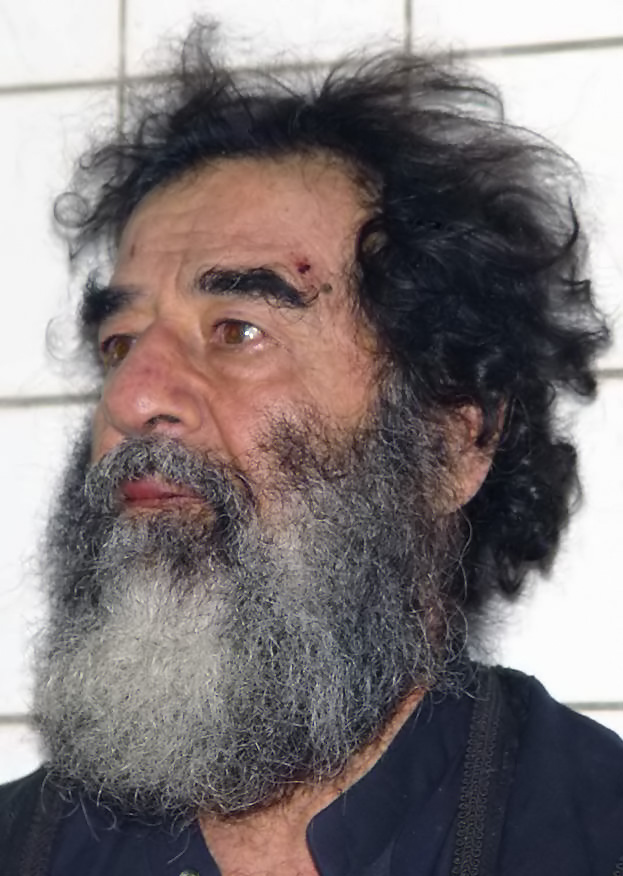
Saddam Hussein's lawyers wrote to the ICC claiming he had been the victim of war crimes.

In March 2003, the United States and its allies, the United Kingdom, Australia and Poland invaded Iraq. The UK, Australia and Poland are all states parties to the ICC Statute and therefore their nationals are liable to prosecution by the court for any relevant crimes. As the United States is not a state party, American citizens can only be prosecuted by the court if the crime takes place in the territory of another state party (e.g. Jordan), or if the situation is referred to it by the Security Council.

The Office of the Prosecutor of the International Criminal Court reported in February 2006 that it had received 240 communications in connection with the invasion of Iraq in March 2003 which alleged that various war crimes had been committed. Many of these communications concerned the British participation in the invasion, as well as the alleged responsibility for torture deaths whilst in detention in British-controlled areas.

On 9 February 2006, Luis Moreno-Ocampo, Chief Prosecutor of the International Criminal Court, published a letter that he had sent to all those who had communicated with him concerning the above, which set out his conclusions on these matters, following a preliminary investigation of the communications. He explained in his decision letter, that essentially two sets of communications were involved.

1. Communications concerning the legality of the invasion itself;
2. Communications concerning the conduct of hostilities between March and May 2003, which included allegations in respect of
  1. the targeting of civilians or clearly excessive attacks;
  2. willful killing or inhuman treatment of civilians.

The Prosecutor's conclusions were as follows:

1. He did not have authority to consider the complaint about the legality of the invasion. Although the ICC Statute includes the crime of "aggression", it indicates that the Court may not exercise jurisdiction over the crime until a provision has been adopted which defines the crime and sets out the conditions under which the Court may exercise jurisdiction with respect to it.
2. The available information did not provide sufficient evidence for proceeding with an investigation of the communications in connection with targeting of civilians or clearly excessive attacks.
3. The available information did provide a reasonable basis for believing that there had been an estimated 4 to 12 victims of willful killing and a limited number of victims of inhuman treatment, totaling in all less than 20 persons. However this on its own was not sufficient for the initiation of an investigation by the ICC because the Statute requires consideration of admissibility before the Court, in light of the gravity of the crimes. Bearing in mind that a key consideration in this regard is the number of victims of particularly serious crimes, he concluded that the situation did not appear to meet the "gravity" threshold.

On 7 July 2006, the defense lawyers for Saddam Hussein wrote to the court, saying that the treatment of Hussein was a breach of the Geneva Conventions and hence a war crime.

==== Italy ====
A complaint has been submitted to the court accusing the government of Italy of crimes against humanity in connection to the expulsion of Romani immigrants in Rome in October 2007.

==== North Korea (Democratic Peoples Republic of Korea – DPRK) ====
On 6 December 2010, the Prosecutor announced a preliminary examination with regard to war crimes allegedly committed on the territory of South Korea. It is about:

- a. the shelling of Yeonpyeong Island on 23 November 2010, which resulted in the killing of South Korean marines and civilians and the injury of many others, and
- b. the sinking of the South Korean warship Cheonan by a torpedo allegedly fired from a North Korean submarine on 26 March 2010, which resulted in the death of 46 persons.

North Korea is not a state party to the Rome Statute, but as the events allegedly took place on the territory of South Korea, which is a state party, the ICC has jurisdiction over the alleged crimes.

==== Nigeria ====
Sixteen foreign NGOs have called for an investigation into the killing of civilians as part of the Conflict in the Niger Delta, including the prosecution of Nigerian Army General Sarkin Yarkin-Bello.

The "Socio-Economic Rights and Accountability Project" wrote to the International Criminal Court in 2010, asking them to investigate the 2010 Jos riots for potential crimes against humanity. The Prosecutor said the situation was being analysed to see if a case should be opened. In January 2011 the Prosecutor said the government had been "very co-operative" and he would prepare a provisional report in the next six months. In November it was stated that the report on the preliminary investigations in Jos would be published the next month.

In November 2012 the prosecutor's office said that there were reasonable grounds to suspect that Boko Haram, a militant jihadist organisation based in Northern Nigeria, had committed crimes against humanity, specifically murder and persecution, since 2009. The office recommended that the Nigerian authorities prosecute those responsible or the ICC could do so itself.

==== South Africa ====
Lawyers representing Khalid Rashid have made a complaint to the court regarding his arrest in South Africa and alleged extraordinary rendition. The court refused his lawyer's request for assistance in finding Rashid, saying his case was outside the jurisdiction of the court.

==== Venezuela ====
On April 11, 2002 clashes between supporters and opponents of President Hugo Chávez during the attempted coup led to a complaint in January 2003 on behalf of some fifty individuals who allegedly suffered injuries, charging Chávez and 24 other officials with crimes against humanity and acts of terrorism. In February 2006, the court Prosecutor concluded that, thus far, there was no evidence of a widespread or systematic attack against any civilian population and hence the court could not continue the investigation.

On December 17, 2008 a group of Venezuelan lawyers filed a complaint against Hugo Chávez before the Prosecutor of the International Criminal Court, accusing him of crimes against humanity based on recurrent violations of human rights of political and common prisoners in the country.

In February 2018, the International Criminal Court announced that it would preliminary investigations into the abuse performed by Venezuelan authorities during the 2017 Venezuelan protests.

=== Communications not concerning states parties ===
The following communications relate to crimes that are not alleged to have been committed in the territory of a state party or by a national of a state party. In these cases, the Court can only exercise jurisdiction if:

- the situation is referred to the Prosecutor by the UN Security Council acting under Chapter VII of the Charter of the United Nations; or
- the state on whose territory the crime is alleged to have occurred, or the state whose national is accused of the crime, declares that it accepts the Court's jurisdiction with respect to the crime in question

As of 2009, the Security Council had referred two situations (Darfur and Libya) to the Court, and only one non-state party (Côte d'Ivoire) had declared that it accepts the Court's jurisdiction. The Palestinian National Authority has also made a declaration accepting the Court's jurisdiction but, since the Palestinian territories are not recognised as a sovereign state, it is unclear whether the Palestinian Authority has the power to make such a declaration.

==== Algeria ====
The Algerian Minister of National Solidarity Djamel Ould-Abbes in December 2007 said the government would file a complaint against Al-Jazeera at the court, saying they were spokesmen for the Al-Qaeda Organization in the Islamic Maghreb and complicit in the 11 December 2007 Algiers bombings. However, some of the victims' families said the minister was using Al-Jazeera as a way of avoiding the issue of amnesties.

==== Bhutan ====
Nepali-speaking refugees from Bhutan have accused the Bhutanese government of "rape, torture and ethnic cleansing" in respect of the expulsion of Nepalese from Bhutan, and have said they will file a complaint with the court.

==== China ====
In July 2020, the East Turkistan Government in Exile (ETGIE) and the East Turkistan National Awakening Movement (ETNAM) filed a complaint against the leadership of the People's Republic of China (PRC), including Chinese Communist Party (CCP) leader Xi Jinping, alleging that it had committed genocide and crimes against humanity in its treatment of the Uighur minority. While the PRC is not a party to the Rome Statute, and therefore does not accept the ICC's jurisdiction, the ETGIE and ETNAM cited a ruling in the case against Myanmar (also not party to the Rome Statute) for its treatment of the Rohingya which allowed the ICC's jurisdiction because part of the crime occurred within the territory of a state party, in this case Bangladesh. The ETGIE and ETNAM's complaint argue that that ruling allows the ICC to claim jurisdiction in its case because the PRC has been bringing Uyghurs from Tajikistan and Cambodia—both state parties to the ICC—into its territory and then committing the same crimes against them as they had been doing to resident Uyghurs. On 14 December 2020, the office of Fatou Bensouda, the ICC Prosecutor, announced the conclusion of its preliminary investigation and that it would not proceed to a full investigation. The report cited the fact that all available evidence for alleged crimes originate from within China, meaning the Court has no territorial jurisdiction over the acts in question. However, the case file has been left open, meaning additional evidence can be submitted and the ICC could open an investigation in the future.

==== Côte d'Ivoire ====
On 15 February 2005, the Court confirmed that Côte d'Ivoire, which is not a state party, had made a declaration in accordance with Article 12, paragraph 3 of the Rome Statute, accepting "the exercise of jurisdiction by the International Criminal Court with respect to crimes committed on its territory since the events of 19 September 2002".

In May 2006 Human Rights Watch called on the court to send a mission to the country in order to bring an end to a culture of impunity. It cited continuing human rights abuses against civilians by state security forces, militia and the New Forces rebels.

People accused of human rights abuses who could be tried include Simone Gbagbo, wife of President Laurent Gbagbo and Guillaume Soro the head of the New Forces rebel army.

In October 2006 a United Nations report recommended that politicians obstructing the peace process should face trial at the ICC.

In November 2006 the Prosecutor confirmed that the situation in Côte d'Ivoire was under analysis.

==== Egypt ====
In December 2011, the ruling military council (Supreme Council of the Armed Forces or SCAF) was referred to the court to look into crimes against humanity against civilians using nerve gas and other banned chemicals during the 2011 Egyptian revolution. The head of the council Tantawi as well as his deputy Anan and other council members were named as accomplices.

==== Israel / Palestine ====
In November 2006, the government of Yemen called on the UN Security Council to refer Israel to the court "to look into barbarian crimes and inhuman acts committed by Israeli forces in Beit Hanoun and Jeneen of Gaza." This was in connection with the 2006 Israel–Gaza conflict. Amnesty International has also characterized the allegedly deliberate attacks by Israeli forces against civilian property and infrastructure in the Gaza Strip as "war crimes". Iran and Yemen also called for the court to prosecute Israeli leaders for "war crimes" committed during the 2008 Israel-Gaza conflict. However a referral is considered unlikely as it would require UN Security Council approval and this is likely to be opposed by the United States.

The Israeli emergency service ZAKA and the Sderot Municipal Authority meanwhile called on the court to investigate Hamas leader Khaled Mashal for crimes against humanity by the shelling of Sderot by rockets fired from Gaza in 2007.

On 22 January 2009, the Palestinian National Authority made a declaration accepting the Court's jurisdiction but, since the Palestinian territories are not recognised as a sovereign state, it is unclear whether the Palestinian Authority has the power to make such a declaration. The Prosecutor has received more than 200 requests to investigate war crimes allegedly committed during the 2008–2009 Israel–Gaza conflict.

In 2015, The Palestinian National Authority officially became a member state of the International Criminal Court, opening a new front in its self-declared "diplomatic war" against Israel. The Palestinians allege that Israel committed war crimes during the 2014 Israel–Gaza conflict, and that the ongoing construction of Israeli settlements and demolition of Palestinian homes in the West Bank is a war crime, as it facilitates a transfer of populations into occupied territory. By joining the ICC, the Palestinians are also exposed to scrutiny. Israel has charged that the militant Islamist movement Hamas and its militia are guilty of both indiscriminate targeting of Israeli cities and civilians, as well as the exposure of its own residents as human shields – they are violations of international law and internationally accepted humanitarian norms, specifically, the violation of the rule of distinction, which requires combatants to limit attacks to legitimate military targets. Amnesty International also concluded that Palestinians are guilty of war crimes for the indiscriminate rocket fire at civilian population centers in Israel.

In August 2022, the family of murdered journalist Shireen Abu Akleh filed a formal complaint about her death with the International Criminal Court (ICC). On May 11, the journalist was shot in the head while covering a gunfight between Israeli soldiers and Palestinian terrorists during an IDF raid near the northern West Bank city of Jenin. The family's new information, which it claimed demonstrates that Israeli soldiers "deliberately targeted" the Palestinian-American Al Jazeera correspondent, was included in the case. A combined investigation by a Palestinian rights organisation and a multidisciplinary research organisation located in London has found further proof that contradicts Israel's claim that the death of veteran Al Jazeera journalist Shireen Abu Akleh was an accident.

==== Lebanon ====
The Lebanese Foreign Minister, Fawzi Salloukh, has called for Israelis to be prosecuted at the court in connections with the 2006 Israel-Lebanon conflict. He accused Israelis of committing a war crime with the bombing of Qana, and this was repeated by the Interior Minister, Ahmad Fatfat on 2 August 2006, who said "a file was being prepared". On 3 August Justice Minister Charles Rizk said that he would be submitting a file to the Security Council asking them to create a special court, similar to the Rwanda Tribunal, as neither Lebanon nor Israel are members of the ICC. On 2 September Rizk formed a committee of legal and media personnel to gather evidence of war crimes for possible submission to the court. Individuals have also made official communications to the court Prosecutor.

In July Jean Ziegler, the United Nations Special Rapporteur on the Right to Food, called for an investigation into whether Israel committed war crimes by attacking supplies of food and water. Israel has admitted using white phosphorus during the war, a weapon that is banned by Protocol III of the Convention on Certain Conventional Weapons when used as an incendiary device against civilians or in civilian areas, but allowed when used for illumination or concealment. (Israel is not party to this protocol.) Doctors in southern Lebanon said they suspected burns victims had been caused by white phosphorus.

Meanwhile, a human rights lawyer in the United Kingdom – a member of the court – is taking legal action under the International Criminal Court Act, accusing British government officials of complicity in Israeli war crimes by allowing the transfer of weapons from the United States via UK airports.

Another British law firm has suggested that Israeli use of cluster bombs would also be a war crime.

On September 14, 2006, Amnesty International released a report accusing Hezbollah of war crimes during the 2006 conflict with Israel.

==== Myanmar ====
The European Parliament called in May 2008 for leaders of the Myanmar State Peace and Development Council to be referred to the court for crimes against humanity, for blocking relief aid following Cyclone Nargis. This call has been echoed by the government of Australia, a shadow minister from the United Kingdom and a parliamentarian from the governing party in France.

==== Somalia ====
In May 2006 a Somali warlord, Musa Sudi Yalahow was reported to have ordered his militiamen to take over Keysaney Hospital in northern Mogadishu, a move that may contravene the laws against war crimes. A Somali NGO, the Somali Justice Advocacy office wrote to the court requesting that it investigate this as a war crime.

Somalia is not a party to the court, and therefore would have to consent or be referred by the UN Security Council in order for the court to have jurisdiction.

In June 2006 the regional body Intergovernmental Authority on Development threatened to do this to warlords it termed "spoilers".

In April 2007, an observer in Somalia from the European Union claimed that soldiers from Ethiopia and Somalia's Transitional Federal Government had targeted Somali civilians as part of the ongoing War in Somalia, and that Ugandan peacekeepers from the African Union Mission to Somalia had stood by while this happened. Although neither Somalia nor Ethiopia are court members, Uganda and three other AMISOM troop-contributors are, and could be charged with complicity in the war crime.

In November 2007 the UN Secretary-General's special envoy to Somalia, Ahmedou Ould-Abdallah, called for the court to prosecute war crimes suspects.

==== Sri Lanka ====
In July 2006 a Sri Lankan American expatriate organisation, the Sri Lankan Patriots, called on the Tamil Tigers to be prosecuted for using child soldiers. Some Tamils have also called for government members to be prosecuted before the court for an alleged attack on a girls' school in LTTE-controlled territory in August 2006.

Sri Lanka is not a party to the court, and therefore would have to consent or be referred by the UN Security Council in order for the court to have jurisdiction.

==== Thailand ====
Former Senator Kraisak Choonhavan called in November 2006 for former premier Thaksin Shinawatra to be investigated for crimes against humanity connected to 2,500 alleged extrajudicial killings carried out in 2003 against suspected drug dealers. This would first require Thailand to ratify the court and to accept retrospective jurisdiction. In response, the Justice Minister, Charnchai Likhitjitta, said that ratification had been discussed by the cabinet but needed "careful deliberation" as any decision would affect all Thais.

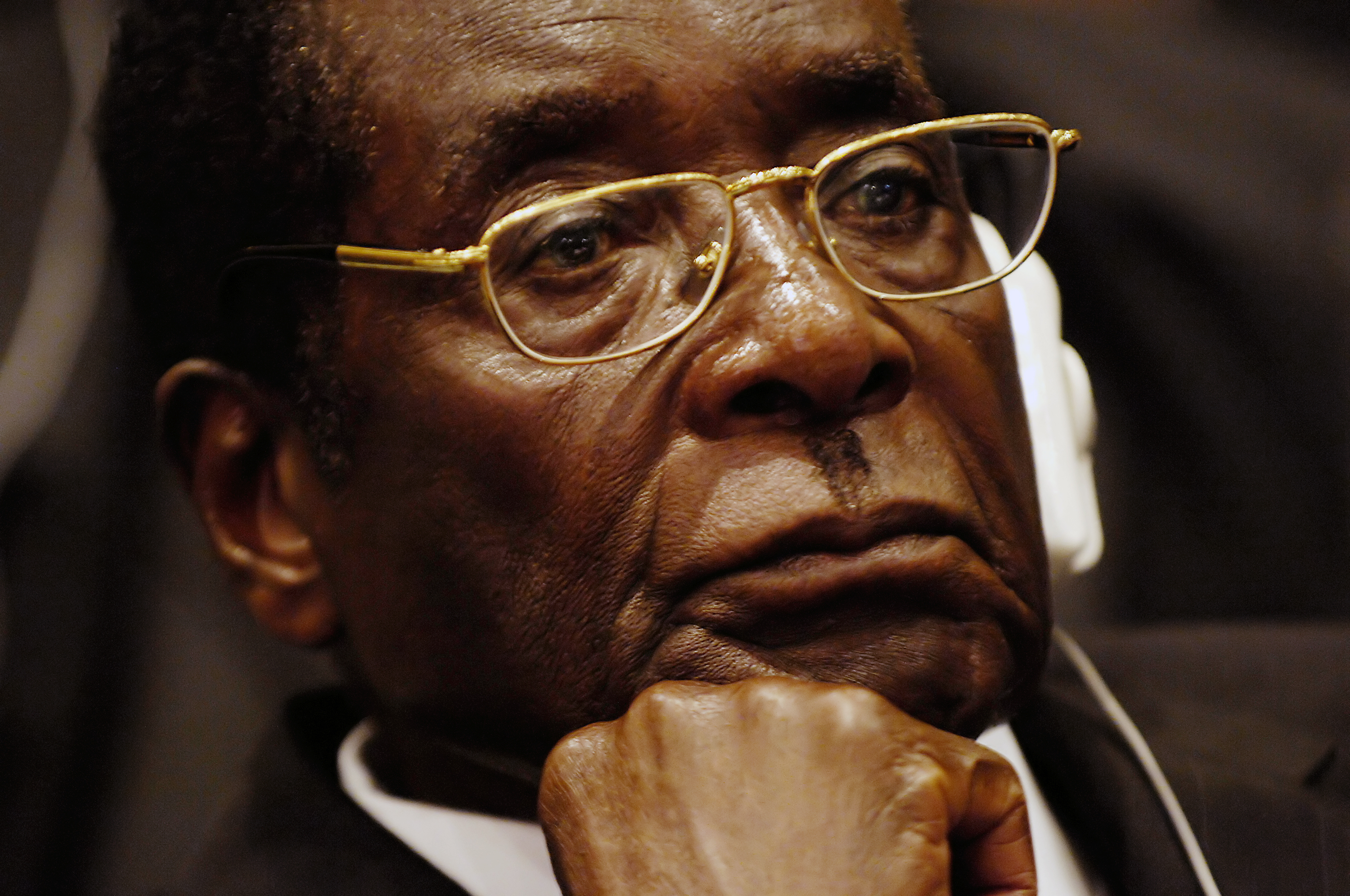
The UN Security Council has been urged to refer Robert Mugabe to the ICC.

==== Zimbabwe ====
Since 2005, various calls have been made for the situation in Zimbabwe to be referred to the court by the Security Council, including:

- The government of Australia
- The government of New Zealand
- The International Bar Association
- The then British opposition Conservative and Liberal Democrat parties
- The Foreign Affairs Select Committee of the British House of Lords
- The Namibian National Society for Human Rights
- The Democratic Alliance opposition in South Africa

A Zimbabwe government spokesman described the calls as spurious and "an attempt to tarnish the image of the president and country".
