= John Walker (inventor) =

18/19th-century English inventor of the friction match

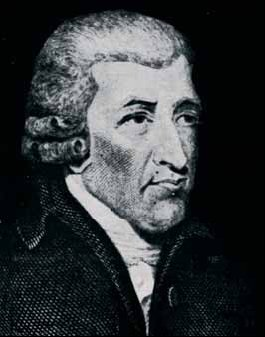

John Walker (29 May 1781 – 1 May 1859) was an English chemist and pharmacist credited with inventing the friction light, the first commercially successful friction match, in either 1826 or 1827. Upon demonstration of the general principle, others quickly improved and industrialized his formulation, driving the price down until he ceased to make his matches by 1830.

== Life ==
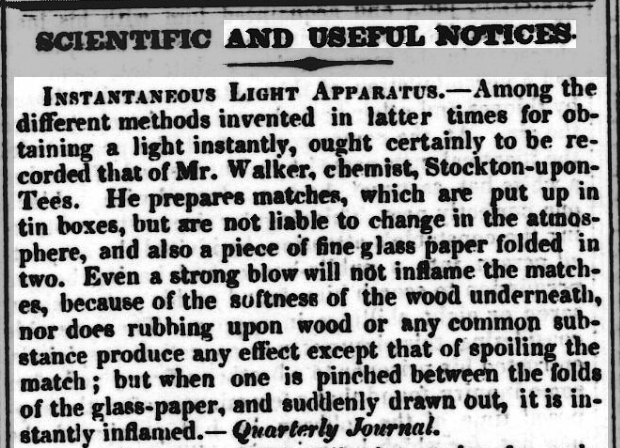
The belated publication of Walker's discovery as it appeared in the 10 October 1829 edition of the Sheffield Independent.

Walker was born in Stockton-on-Tees, Durham, England on 29 May 1781. He went to the local grammar school and was afterwards apprenticed to Watson Alcock, the principal surgeon of the town. He had, however, an aversion to the era's surgical operations and had to leave the profession, turning instead to chemistry. After studying in Durham and York, he set up a small business as a chemist and pharmacist at 59 High Street, Stockton, around 1818. While experimenting with various chemical matches for the use of local hunters, he invented the first practical and commercially successful friction match in 1826 or 1827, but he demurred from securing a royal patent, stating "I doubt not it will be a benefit to the public, so let them have it." The invention was greatly publicized by Michael Faraday's lectures in London in 1829 and by journal articles the same year, but other producers—particularly Samuel Jones, a chemist in London—quickly replicated and improved his product, causing him to cease its production by 1830. Walker died in Stockton on 1 May 1859 and was buried in the grounds of St Mary's Church in nearby Norton.

== Friction match ==
The exact date of Walker's invention of the friction match is uncertain, the first extant record of his work being a note about a sale upon credit dated 7 April 1827. The note further mentions "No. 30", however, which may have indicated the batch number and might imply the actual invention had occurred the previous year in 1826.

He had already been creating variations on Jean Chancel's dipping chemical matches for use by local hunters. Several chemical mixtures were already known that would ignite by a sudden explosion, but it had not been found possible to transmit the flame to a slow-burning substance like wood. Having mixed his percussion powder with a Chancel match, Walker found the resulting match ignited during an accidental strike against his hearth. He did not make his formulation public or even record it in his notes, such that it was necessary to later analyze his products to establish that they were wooden sticks 3 inches long by 1/6 inches wide by 1/20 inches high (7.6×0.4×0.1 cm) dipped in sulfur and tipped with a mixture of equal parts of antimony trisulfide and potassium chlorate bound to the wood with gumwater allowed to dry in place. Walker's matches were stored in a tin cylinder that included a piece of sandpaper ("glass-paper"). To light each match, the paper was folded in half and the match drawn through it.

He at once appreciated the practical value of the discovery and started marketing his matches, originally listed in his records as sulphurata hyperoxygenata frict. but renamed "friction lights" by September 1827 and occasionally "attrition lights" in 1828. (Despite the confusion of many later accounts, Walker never referred to them as "matches", "lucifers", or "Congreves".) From 1827–1829, Walker sold a few hundred sets of matches at the price of 1 shilling 2 pence for 100 matches and the tin or 1 shilling flat for 84 matches and the tin.

Isaac Holden supposedly arrived at a similar formulation independently in October 1829, which a student quickly passed on to his father, the London chemist Samuel Jones. Jones began commercializing a version of Holden's product throughout Britain as the "Promethean" or "lucifer match" (Latin: lucifer, "light-bearer"). Its popularity—and much lower price—prompted Walker to stop making his own formulation by 1830. Shortly thereafter, strike-anywhere matches employing white phosphorus instead of Walker's antimony trisulfide quickly overran the market until the invention and popularization of the red phosphorus safety match—generally credited to the Swedish chemist Gustaf Erik Pasch—in the 1850s and 1860s.
