= Match =

Device for lighting fires

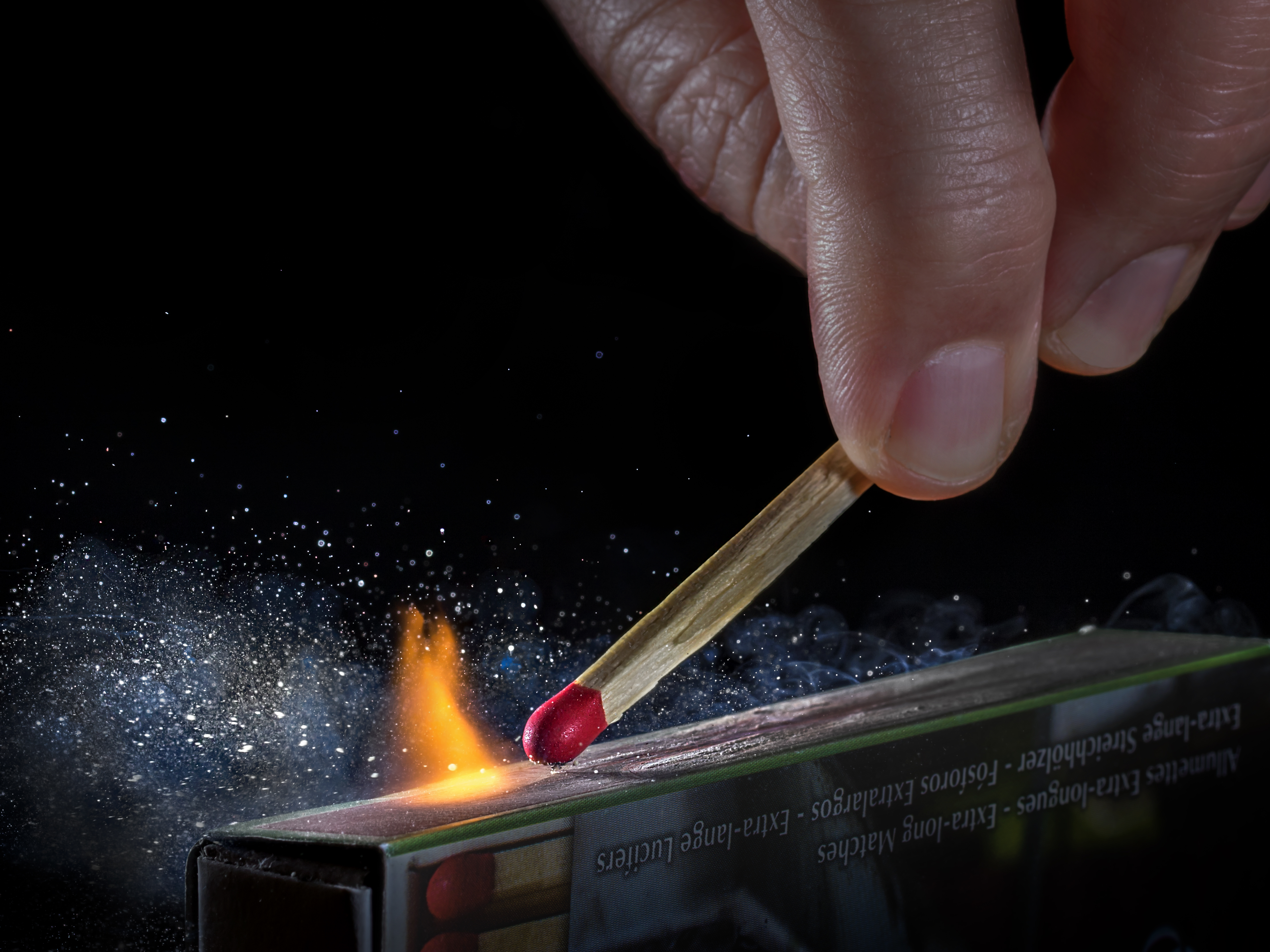
Igniting a match on the striking strip of a matchbox

A match is a tool for starting a fire. Typically, matches are made of small wooden sticks or stiff paper. One end is coated with a material that can be ignited by friction generated by striking the match against a suitable surface. Wooden matches are packaged in matchboxes, and paper matches are partially cut into rows and stapled into matchbooks. The coated end of a match, known as the match "head", consists of a bead of active ingredients and binder, often colored for easier inspection. There are two main types of matches: safety matches, which can be struck only against a specially prepared surface, and strike-anywhere matches, for which any suitably frictional surface can be used.

== Etymology ==
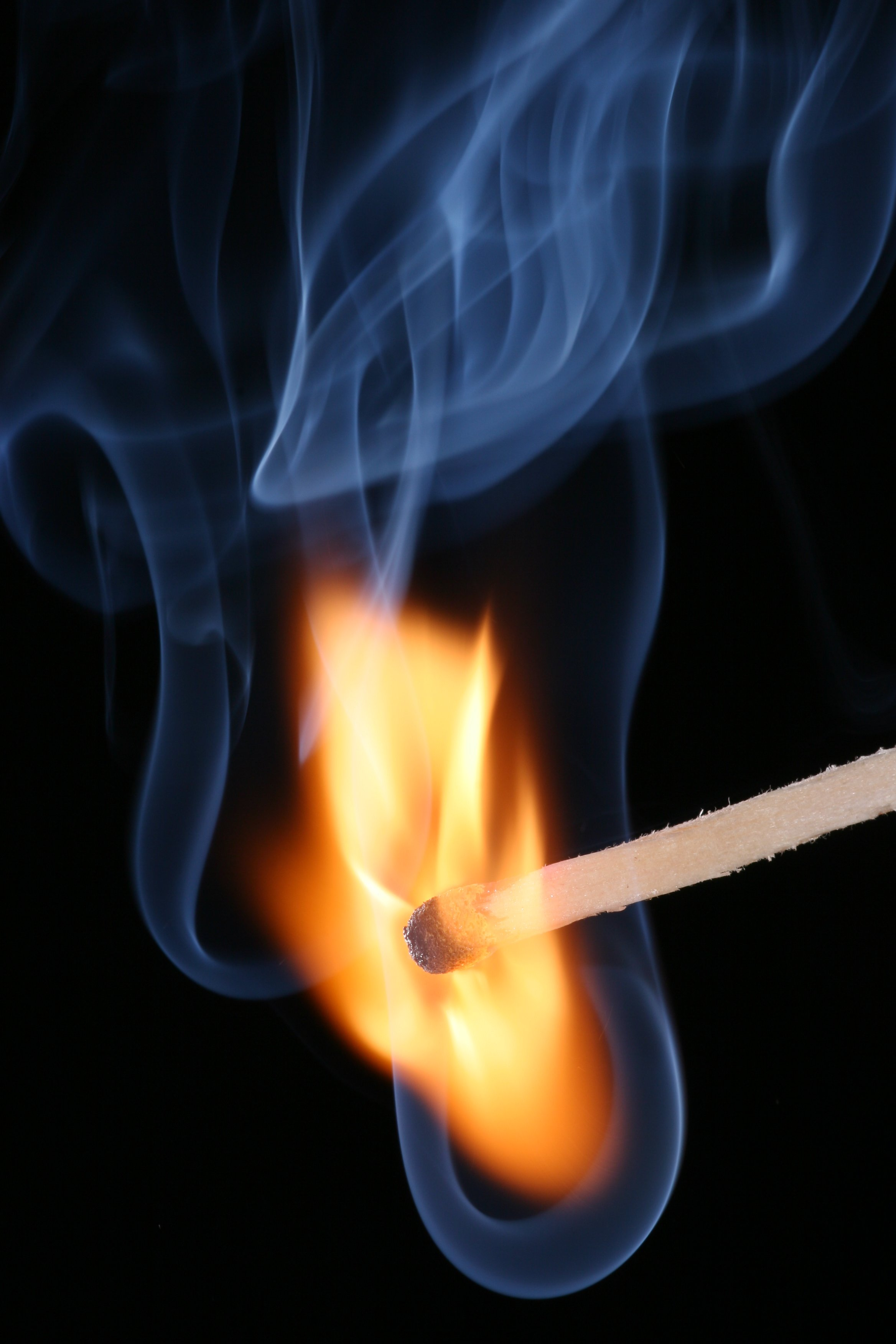
A lit match

The word match derives from Old French mèche, referring to the wick of a candle. Historically, the term match referred to lengths of cord (later cambric) impregnated with chemicals, and allowed to burn continuously. These were used to light fires and fire guns (see matchlock) and cannons (see linstock) and to detonate explosive devices such as dynamite sticks. Such matches were characterized by their burning speed i.e. quick match and slow match. Depending on its formulation, a slow match burns at a rate of around 30 cm (1 ft) per hour and a quick match at 4–60 centimeters (1.6–23.6 inches) per minute for unconfined to even 3–6 meters (10–20 feet) per second for confined.

The modern equivalent of a match (in the sense of a burnable cord) is the simple fuse such as a visco fuse, still used in pyrotechnics to obtain a controlled time delay before ignition. The original meaning of the word still persists in some pyrotechnics terms, such as black match (a black-powder-impregnated fuse) and Bengal match (a firework akin to sparklers producing a relatively long-burning, colored flame). However, when friction matches became commonplace, the term match came to refer mainly to these.

== History ==
=== Early matches ===
A note in the Yuan and Ming-era scholar Tao Zongyi's c. 1366 Chuogeng Lu describes a form of sulfur taper or match, small pieces of pinewood impregnated with sulfur, which he claims "impoverished court ladies" used in 577 during the conquest of the Northern Qi. During the 10th-century Five Dynasties and Ten Kingdoms interregnum, Tao Gu's c. 950 Records of the Unworldly and the Strange stated:

If there occurs an emergency at night it may take some time to make a light to light a lamp. But an ingenious man devised the system of impregnating little sticks of pinewood with sulfur and storing them ready for use. At the slightest touch of fire, they burst into flame. One gets a little flame like an ear of corn. This marvelous thing was formerly called a "light-bringing slave", but afterward when it became an article of commerce its name was changed to "fire inch-stick".

Around the time of Marco Polo's supposed visit to China, such sulfur tapers were considered part of the distinctive products of Lin'an (now Hangzhou) and Zhou Mi's 1290 Antiquities of the Martial Forest (t 《武林舊事》, s 《武林旧事》, Wǔlín Jiùshì), while memorializing the traditions of the former Song capital, listed them prominently among the items sold in its markets. They were known as "candle starters" (t 發燭, s 发烛, fāzhú) or "little burners" (t 焠兒, s 焠儿, cuì'er).

=== Chemical matches ===
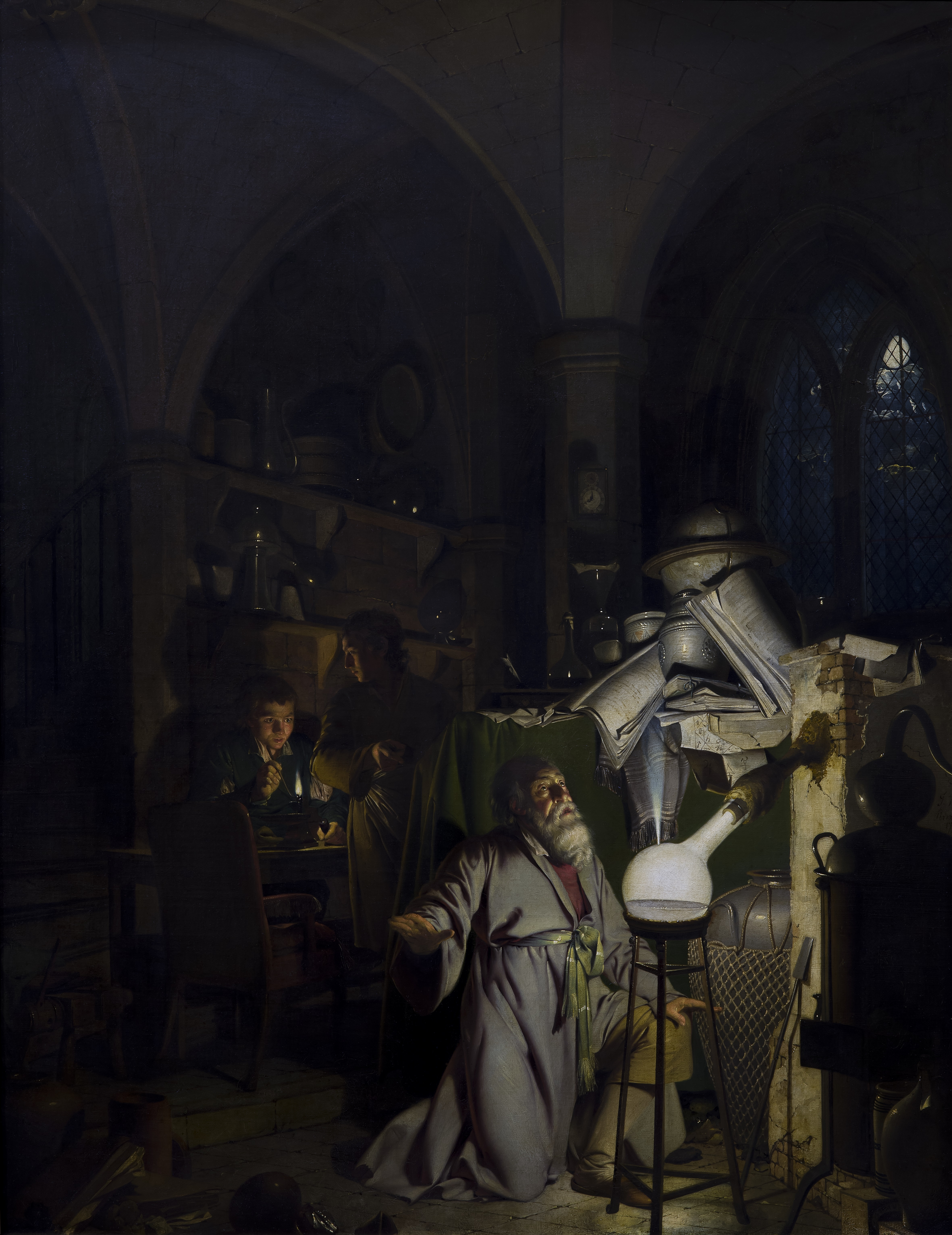
The Alchemist in Search of the Philosophers Stone (1771), by Joseph Wright, depicting Hennig Brand discovering phosphorus.

Before the use of matches, fires were sometimes lit using a burning glass (a lens) to focus the sun on tinder, a method that could only work on sunny days. Another more common method was igniting tinder with sparks produced by striking flint and steel, or by sharply increasing air pressure in a fire piston. Early work had been done by alchemist Hennig Brand, who discovered the flammable nature of phosphorus in 1669. Others, including Robert Boyle and his assistant, Ambrose Godfrey, continued these experiments in the 1680s with phosphorus and sulfur, but their efforts did not produce practical and inexpensive methods for generating fires.

A number of different ways were employed to light smoking tobacco: One was the use of a spill – a thin object something like a thin candle, a rolled paper or a straw, which would be lit from a nearby, already existing flame and then used to light the cigar or pipe – most often kept near the fireplace in a spill vase. Another method saw the use of a striker, a tool that looked like scissors, but with flint on one "blade" and steel on the other. These would then be rubbed together, ultimately producing sparks. If neither of these two was available, one could also use ember tongs to pick up a coal from a fire and light the tobacco directly.

The first modern, self-igniting match was invented in 1805 by Jean Chancel, assistant to Professor Louis Jacques Thénard of Paris. The head of the match consisted of a mixture of potassium chlorate, sulfur, gum arabic and sugar. The match was ignited by dipping its tip in a small asbestos bottle filled with sulfuric acid. This kind of match was quite expensive, however, and its use was also relatively dangerous, so Chancel's matches were never widely adopted for commonplace use.

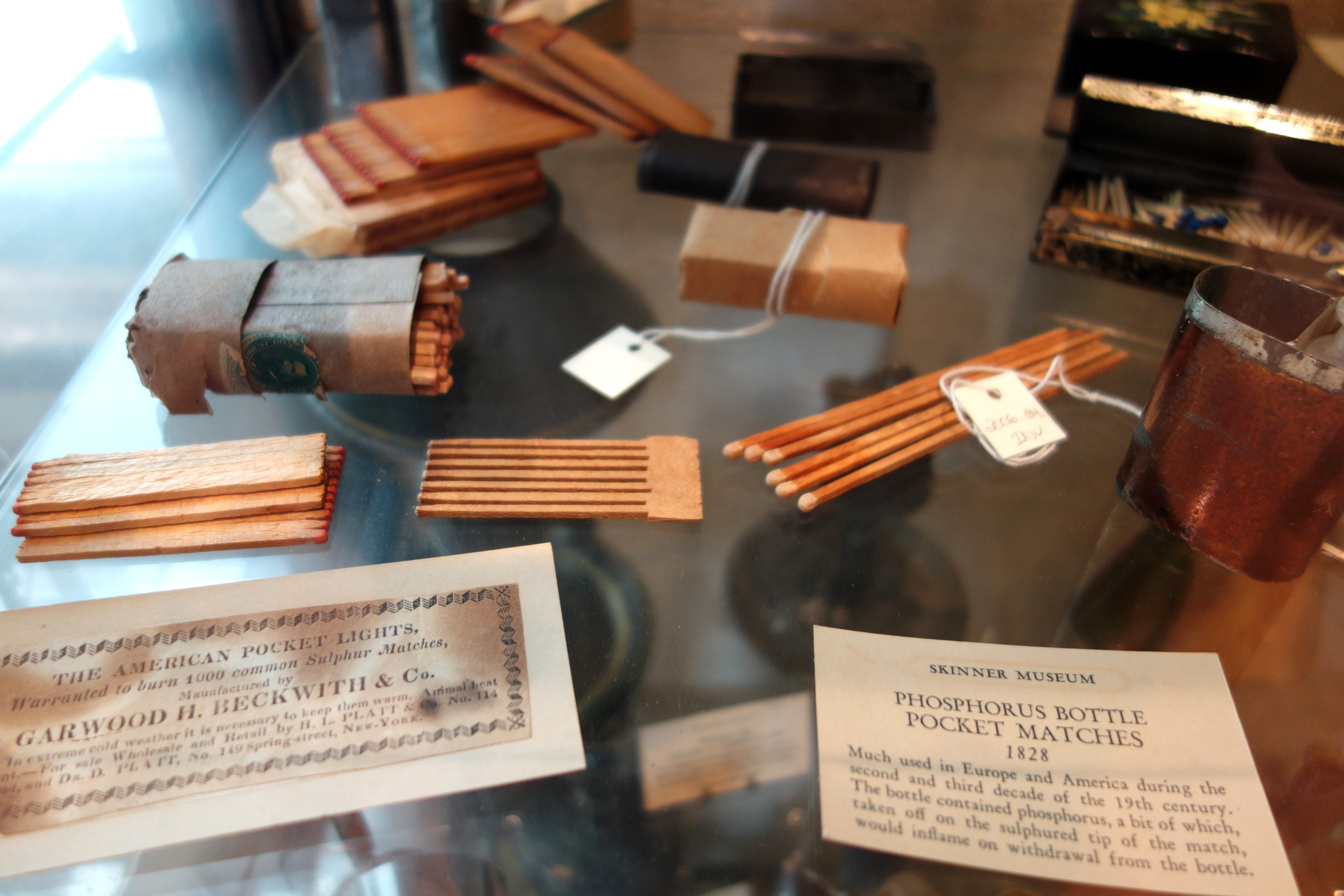
Sulfur-head matches, 1828, lit by dipping into a bottle of phosphorus

This approach to match making was further refined in the following decades, culminating with the 'Promethean match' that was patented by Samuel Jones of London in 1828. His match consisted of a small glass capsule containing a chemical composition of sulfuric acid colored with indigo and coated on the exterior with potassium chlorate, all of which was wrapped up in rolls of paper. The immediate ignition of this particular form of a match was achieved by crushing the capsule with a pair of pliers, mixing and releasing the ingredients for it to become alight.

In London, similar matches meant for lighting cigars were introduced in 1849 by Heurtner who had a shop called the Lighthouse in the Strand. One version that he sold was called "Euperion" (sometimes "Empyrion") which was popular for kitchen use and nicknamed as "Hugh Perry", while another meant for outdoor use was called a "Vesuvian" or "flamer". The head was large and contained niter, charcoal and wood dust, and had a phosphorus tip. The handle was large and made of hardwood so as to burn vigorously and last for a while. Some even had glass stems. Both Vesuvians and Prometheans had a bulb of sulfuric acid at the tip which had to be broken to start the reaction.

In 1832, William Newton patented the "wax vesta" in England. It consisted of a wax stem that embedded cotton threads and had a tip of phosphorus. Variants known as "candle matches" were made by Savaresse and Merckel in 1836. John Hucks Stevens also patented a safety version of the friction match in 1839.

=== Friction matches ===
Chemical matches were unable to make the leap into mass production due to their expense, cumbersome nature, and inherent danger. An alternative method was to produce the ignition through friction produced by rubbing two rough surfaces together. Two early examples were produced in France. In 1810, Baron Cagniard de la Tour produced the "phosphorus bottle", which used a sulfur-infused taper to extract partially oxidized phosphorus from a vial, which then produced a flame when struck against any firm surface. Another was François Derosne's 1816 briquet phosphorique, which similarly used a sulfur-tipped taper to scrape a tube internally coated with phosphorus. Both proved inconvenient and unsafe.

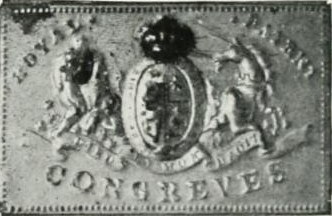
A tin "Congreves" matchbox from the 1830s, misattributed in its source to John Walker, inventor of the friction match in 1826 or 1827.

The first commercially successful friction match was invented by John Walker, an chemist and pharmacist in Stockton-on-Tees, England. This may have occurred during experiments in 1826 but his sulphurata hyperoxygenata frict. were first recorded in a note on a sale upon credit on 7 April 1827. He changed the name to "friction lights" or "attrition lights" a few months later. (Despite the confusion of many later accounts, he never referred to them as "matches", "lucifers", or "Congreves".) He had developed a keen interest in trying to find a means of obtaining fire easily, creating variations on Chancel's dipping matches to assist local hunters. Several chemical mixtures were already known that would ignite by a sudden explosion, but it had not been found possible to transmit the flame to a slow-burning substance like wood. Having mixed his percussion powder with a Chancel match, Walker found the resulting match ignited during an accidental strike against his hearth. He at once appreciated the practical value of the discovery and started making friction matches, although he demurred from securing a royal patent, stating "I doubt not it will be a benefit to the public, so let them have it." He did not, however, make his own formulation public or even record it in his notes, such that it was necessary to later analyze his products to establish that they were wooden sticks 3 inches long by 1/6 inches wide by 1/20 inches high (7.6×0.4×0.1 cm) dipped in sulfur and tipped with a mixture of equal parts of antimony trisulfide and potassium chlorate bound to the wood with gumwater allowed to dry in place. The sulfur's unpleasant odor was improved by the addition of camphor. Walker's matches were stored in a tin cylinder that included a piece of sandpaper ("glass-paper"). To light each match, the paper was folded in half and the match drawn through it. From 1827–1829, Walker sold a few hundred sets of matches at the price of 1 shilling 2 pence for 100 matches and the tin or 1 shilling flat for 84 matches and the tin. These first matches were widely publicized by Michael Faraday's lectures in London in 1829 and by journal articles the same year. However, they remained dangerous, with lit fragments sometimes falling to the floor and burning carpets and dresses, prompting bans on their production or sale in France and Germany.

The Scottish inventor Sir Isaac Holden produced an improved version of Walker's match and demonstrated it to his class at Castle Academy in Reading, Berkshire, in 1829. Holden did not patent his invention either but Samuel Jones, the father of one of his students and a London chemist, quickly did and began commercializing a version of Holden's product throughout Britain as the "Promethean" or "lucifer match" (Latin: lucifer, "light-bearer"). Its popularity—and much lower price—prompted Walker to stop making his own formulation by 1830, while Richard Bell opened the first match factory in 1832 in London. Jones and Bell's lucifer matches were pirated in turn by Ezekial Byam in the United States. These matches continued to have unpleasant fumes, an unsteady flame, and could ignite explosively, sometimes throwing sparks a considerable distance. Nonetheless, they sold well and "lucifer" persisted as a genericized term for matches into the 20th century, with the song "Pack Up Your Troubles" including the lines "and smile, smile, smile while you've a lucifer to light your fag". Matches are still called "lucifers" in Dutch.

Charles Sauria, a chemistry student at the Collège de l'Arc in Dole, France, substituted white phosphorus for the antimony trisulfide in Walker, Holden, and Jones's matches in 1830 or January 1831. This formulation could light when struck against any surface, produced odorless toxic fumes, and needed to be stored in airtight metal containers to avoid accidental ignition. They quickly replaced the earlier sulfurous formulations. Sauria also did not patent his invention, which was marketed in Germany as "Congreves" after the English rocket pioneer William Congreve because of his management of the Imperial Continental Gas Association during the 1820s. This name became popular in Britain but they were more generally known in the United States as locofocos, which gave its name to a progressive faction of the Democratic Party. In 1832, Samuel Jones adapted his regular phosphorus match to also produce "fuzees", slower burning matches for use with cigars and pipes. The earliest American patent for the phosphorus friction match was granted in 1836 to Alonzo Dwight Phillips of Springfield, Massachusetts, while John Hucks Stevens pirated Jones's fuzees as "fusse cigar lights" in 1839.

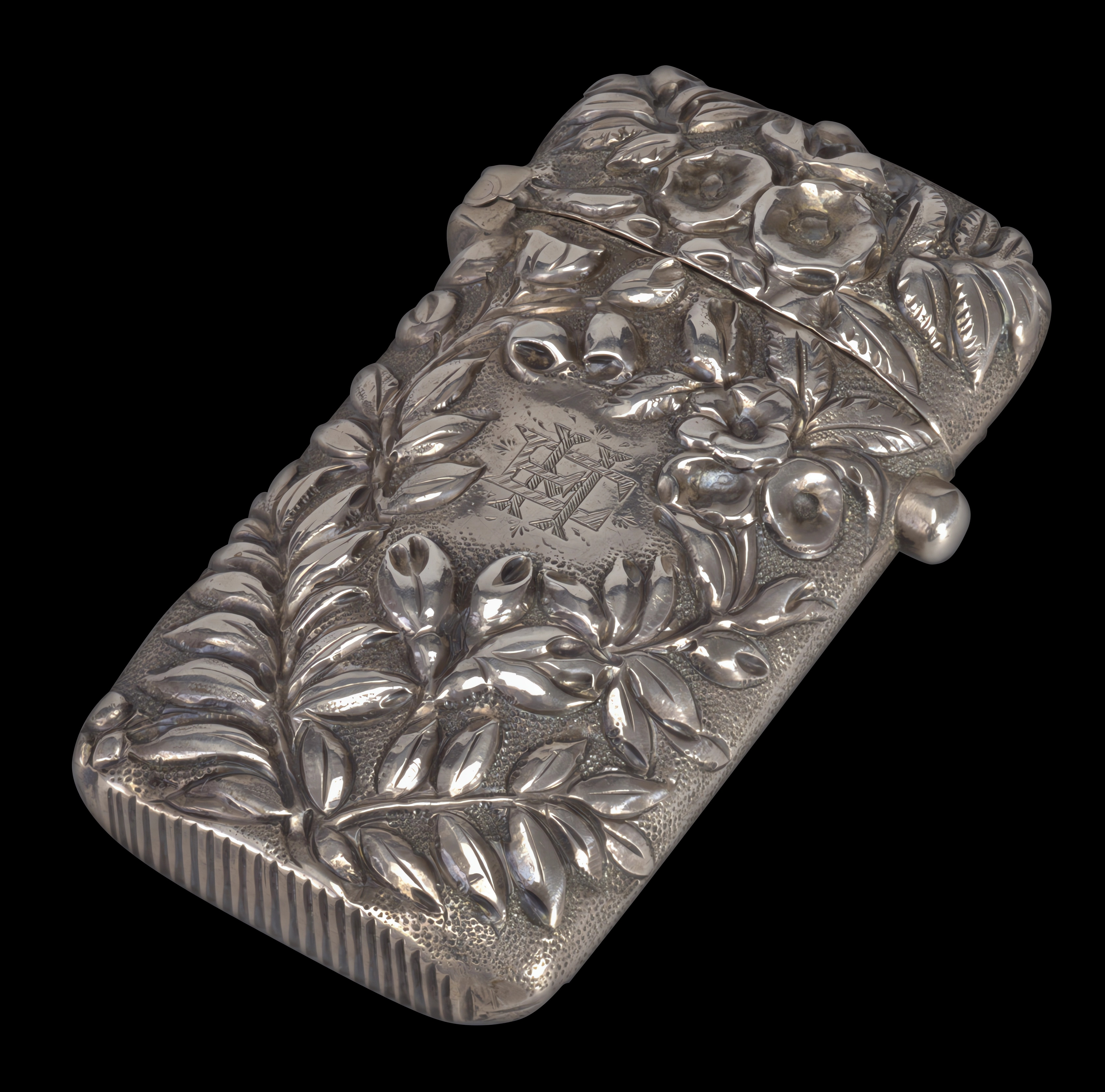
Match container, c. 1875

From 1830 to 1890, the composition of matches remained largely unchanged, although some improvements were made. In 1843 William Ashgard replaced the sulfur with beeswax, reducing the pungency of the fumes. This was replaced by paraffin in 1862 by Charles W. Smith, resulting in what were called "parlor matches". From 1870, the end of the splint was fireproofed by impregnation with fire-retardant chemicals such as alum, sodium silicate, and other salts resulting in what was commonly called a "drunkard's match" that prevented the accidental burning of the user's fingers.

A noiseless match was invented in 1836 by the Hungarian János Irinyi, who was a student of chemistry. An unsuccessful experiment by his professor, Meissner, gave Irinyi the idea to replace potassium chlorate with lead dioxide in the head of the phosphorus match. He liquefied phosphorus in warm water and shook it in a glass vial, until the two liquids emulsified. He mixed the phosphorus with lead dioxide and gum arabic, poured the paste-like mass into a jar, and dipped the pine sticks into the mixture and let them dry. When he tried them that evening, all of them lit evenly. He sold the invention and production rights for these noiseless matches to István Rómer, a Hungarian pharmacist living in Vienna, for 60 florins (about 22.5 oz t of silver). As a match manufacturer, Rómer became rich, and Irinyi went on to publish articles and a textbook on chemistry, and founded several match factories.

Other advances were made for the mass manufacture of matches. By 1847, over a thousand people were employed in France in friction match manufacture. Early matches were made from blocks of wood with cuts separating the splints but leaving their bases attached. Later versions were made in the form of thin combs. The splints would be broken away from the comb when required.

=== Regulation of white phosphorus ===
The London matchgirls strike of 1888 campaigned against the use of white phosphorus in match making, which led to bone disorders such as phossy jaw.

Packing girls at the Bryant & May factory

Those involved in the manufacture of the new phosphorus matches were afflicted with phossy jaw and other bone disorders, and there was enough white phosphorus in one pack to kill a person. Deaths and suicides from eating the heads of matches became frequent. The earliest report of phosphorus necrosis was made in 1845 by Lorinser in Vienna, and a New York surgeon published a pamphlet with notes on nine cases. The conditions of working-class women at the Bryant & May factories led to the London matchgirls strike of 1888. The strike was focused on the severe health complications of working with white phosphorus, such as phossy jaw. Social activist Annie Besant published an article in her halfpenny weekly paper The Link on 23 June 1888. A strike fund was set up and some newspapers collected donations from readers. The women and girls also solicited contributions. Members of the Fabian Society, including George Bernard Shaw, Sidney Webb, and Graham Wallas, were involved in the distribution of the cash collected. The strike and negative publicity led to changes being made to limit the health effects of the inhalation of white phosphorus.

Attempts were made to reduce the ill-effects on workers through the introduction of inspections and regulations. Anton Schrötter von Kristelli discovered in 1850 that heating white phosphorus at 250 °C in an inert atmosphere produced a red allotropic form, which did not fume in contact with air. It was suggested that this would make a suitable substitute in match manufacture although it was slightly more expensive. Two French chemists, Henri Savene and Emile David Cahen, proved in 1898 that the addition of phosphorus sesquisulfide meant that the substance was not poisonous, that it could be used in a "strike-anywhere" match, and that the match heads were not explosive. British company Albright and Wilson was the first company to produce phosphorus sesquisulfide matches commercially. The company developed a safe means of making commercial quantities of phosphorus sesquisulfide in 1899 and started selling it to match manufacturers.

White Phosphorus Matches Prohibition Act 1908 (Note: Section 5(1).)
- Act of Parliament
- Parliament of the United Kingdom
- Long title: An Act to prohibit the Manufacture, Sale, and Importation of Matches made with White Phosphorus, and for other purposes in connection therewith.
- Citation: 8 Edw. 7. c. 42
- Territorial extent: United Kingdom

Dates
- Royal assent: 21 December 1908
- Commencement: 1 January 1910
- Repealed: England and Wales and Scotland: 1 July 1938; Northern Ireland: 18 December 1953
Other legislation
Amended by	Customs and Excise Act 1952
Repealed by	England and Wales and Scotland: Factories Act 1937; Northern Ireland: Statute Law Revision Act 1953

Status: Repealed

Text of statute as originally enacted

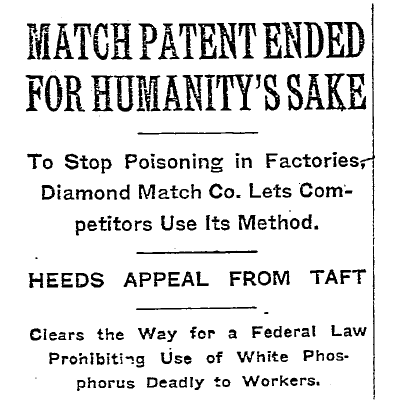
A New York Times report dated 29 January 1911

The serious effects of white phosphorus led many countries to ban its use. Finland prohibited the use of white phosphorus in 1872, followed by Denmark in 1874, France in 1897, Switzerland in 1898, and the Netherlands in 1901. An agreement, the Berne Convention, was reached at Bern, Switzerland, in September 1906, which banned the use of white phosphorus in matches. This required each country to pass laws prohibiting the use of white phosphorus in matches.

The United Kingdom passed the White Phosphorus Matches Prohibition Act 1908 (8 Edw. 7. c. 42) prohibiting its use in matches after 31 December 1910. The United States did not pass a law, but instead placed a "punitive tax" in 1913 on white phosphorus–based matches, one so high as to render their manufacture financially impractical, and Canada banned them in 1914. India and Japan banned them in 1919; China followed, banning them in 1925.

In 1901 Albright and Wilson started making phosphorus sesquisulfide at their Niagara Falls, New York plant for the US market, but American manufacturers continued to use white phosphorus matches. The Niagara Falls plant made them until 1910, when the United States Congress forbade the shipment of white phosphorus matches in interstate commerce.

=== Safety matches ===
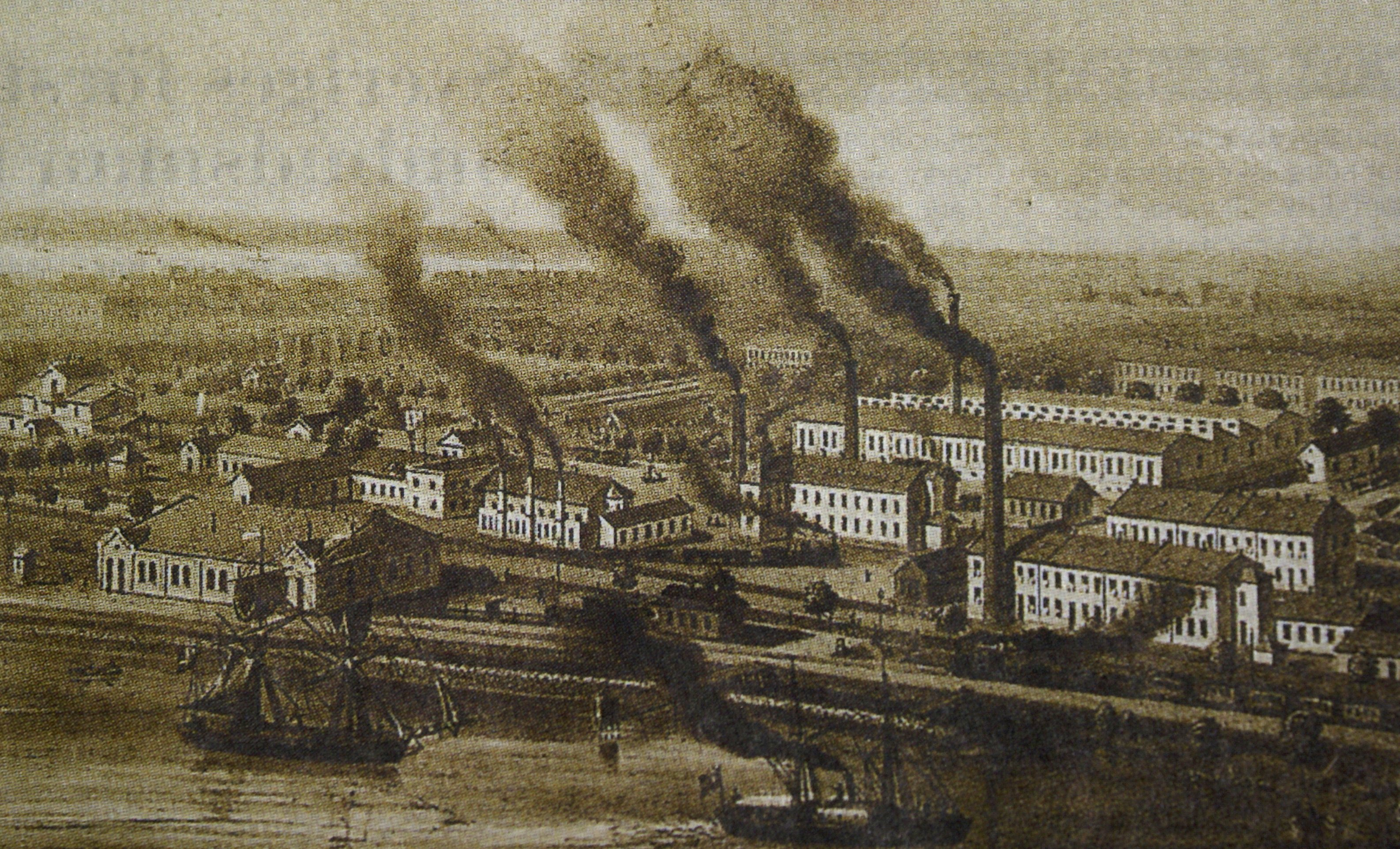
Jönköpings safety match industry, 1872

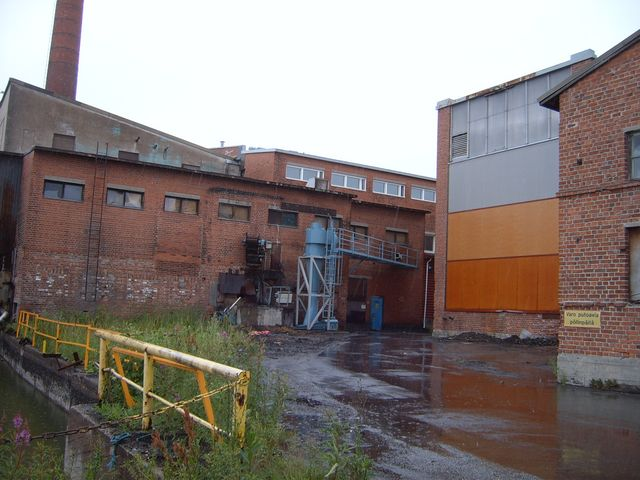
Old match factory in Itkonniemi, Kuopio, Finland

In addition to the dangers of white phosphorus in the manufacture of matches, its easy combustibility became a major issue. During the 1850s and 1860s, London regularly saw dozens of major fires each year from children playing with strike-anywhere matches or from their careless use. This led to the development of the "safety match", whose major innovation was the use of red phosphorus on a separate and specially-designed striking surface, rather than placement on the head of the match itself.

The idea of creating a specially designed striking surface was developed in 1844 by the Swede Gustaf Erik Pasch. Pasch patented the use of red phosphorus in the striking surface. He found that this could ignite heads that did not need to contain white phosphorus. Meanwhile, Arthur Albright developed an industrial process for large-scale manufacture of red phosphorus after Schrötter's discoveries became known. By 1851, his company was producing the substance by heating white phosphorus in a sealed pot at a specific temperature. He exhibited his red phosphorus at the 1851 Great Exhibition in The Crystal Palace in London. Johan Edvard Lundström and his younger brother Carl Frans Lundström (1823–1917) had started a large-scale match industry in Jönköping, Sweden around 1847, but the improved safety match was not introduced until the early 1850s. The Lundström brothers had obtained a sample of red phosphorus matches from Albright at the Great Exhibition, but had misplaced it and therefore they did not try the matches until just before the 1855 Universal Exhibition in Paris, when they found that the matches were still usable. In 1858 their company produced around 12 million matchboxes.

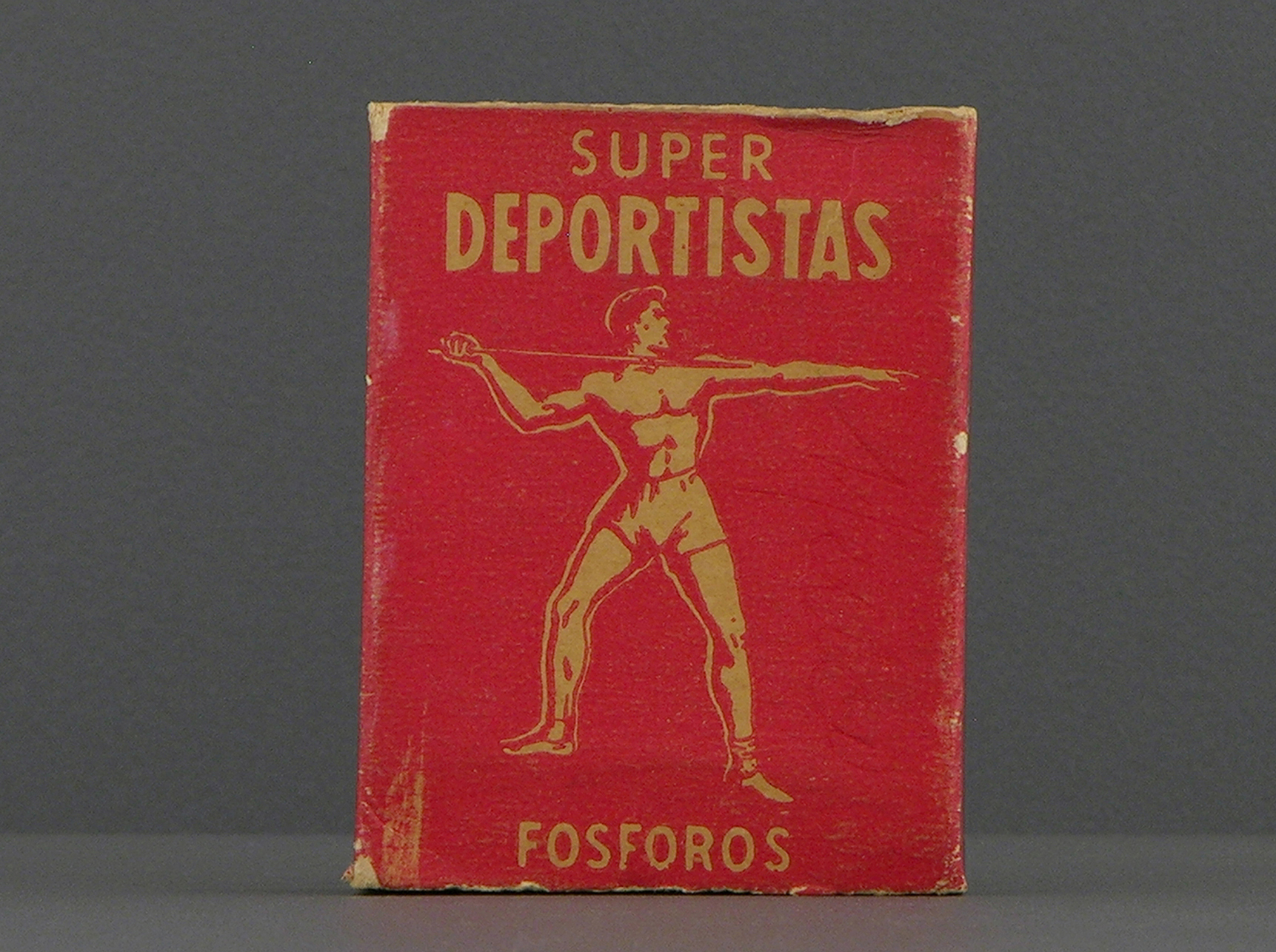
Super Deportistas matches from mid-20th century Mexico, part of the permanent collection of the Museo del Objeto del Objeto, in Mexico City

The safety of true "safety matches" is derived from the separation of the reactive ingredients between a match head on the end of a splint and the special striking surface (in addition to the general safety benefits of replacing the white phosphorus with red phosphorus). The splint was also soaked in paraffin rather than sulfur to improve the flame's odor. The idea for separating the chemicals had been introduced in 1859 in the form of two-headed matches known in France as Allumettes Androgynes. These were sticks with one end made of potassium chlorate and the other of red phosphorus. They had to be broken and the heads rubbed together. There was, however, a risk of the heads rubbing each other accidentally in their box. Such dangers were removed when the striking surface was moved to the outside of the box. The development of a specialized matchbook with both matches and a striking surface occurred in the 1890s with the American Joshua Pusey, who sold his patent to the Diamond Match Company.

The Swedes long held a virtual worldwide monopoly on safety matches, with the industry mainly situated in Jönköping, by 1903 called Jönköpings & Vulcans Tändsticksfabriks AB today Swedish Match. In France, they sold the rights to their safety match patent to Coigent Père & Fils of Lyon, but Coigent contested the payment in the French courts, on the basis that the invention was known in Vienna before the Lundström brothers patented it. The British match manufacturer Bryant and May visited Jönköping in 1858 to try to obtain a supply of safety matches, but was unsuccessful. In 1862 it established its own factory and bought the rights for the British safety match patent from the Lundström brothers.

== Modern matches ==
The striking surface on modern matchboxes is typically composed of 25% powdered glass or other abrasive material, 50% red phosphorus, 5% neutralizer, 4% carbon black, and 16% binder; and the match head is typically composed of 45–55% potassium chlorate, with a little sulfur and starch, a neutralizer (ZnO or CaCO_{3}), 20–40% of siliceous filler, diatomite, and glue. Safety matches ignite due to the extreme reactivity of phosphorus with the potassium chlorate in the match head. When the match is struck, the phosphorus and chlorate mix in a small amount and form something akin to the explosive Armstrong's mixture, which ignites due to the friction. The red color of the match head is due to addition of red dyes, not the red phosphorus content.

Friction matches made with white phosphorus as well as those made from phosphorus sesquisulfide can be struck on any suitable surface. They have remained particularly popular in the United States, even when safety matches had become common in Europe, and are still widely used today around the world, including in many developing countries, for such uses as camping, outdoor activities, emergency/survival situations, and stocking homemade survival kits. However, strike-anywhere matches are banned on all kinds of aircraft under the "dangerous goods" classification U.N. 1331, Matches, strike-anywhere.

Safety matches are classified as dangerous goods, "U.N. 1944, Matches, safety". They are not universally forbidden on aircraft; however, they must be declared as dangerous goods and individual airlines or countries may impose tighter restrictions.

== Stormproof matches ==
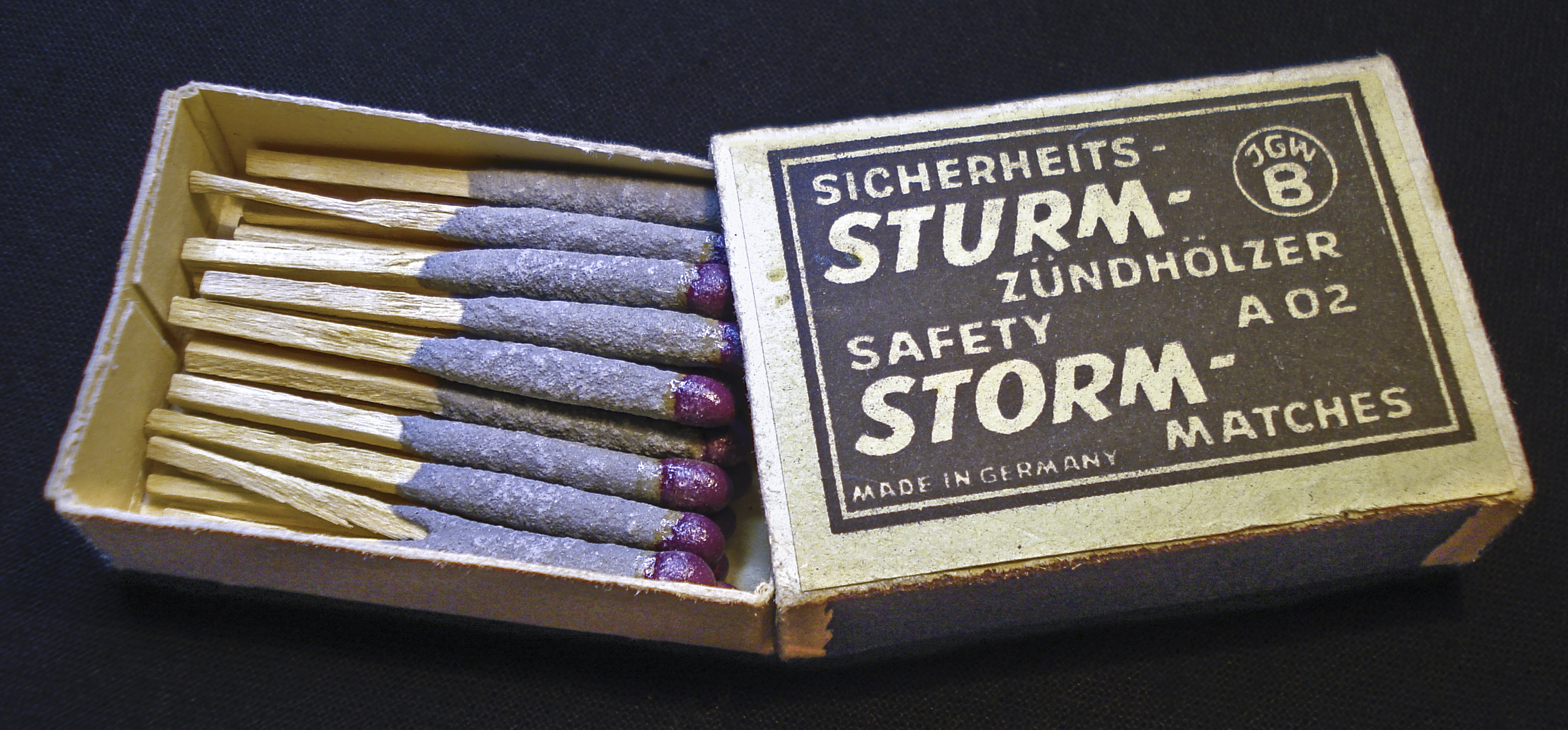
Storm-matches

Stormproof matches, also known as lifeboat matches, are often included in survival kits. They were invented by Morland Micholl Dessau in 1925 and have a strikeable tip similar to a normal match. The matches also have a waterproof coating (which often makes the match more difficult to light). As a result of the combustible coating, they burn strongly even in strong winds, and can even spontaneously re-ignite after being briefly immersed in water.

== Hobbyist collection ==
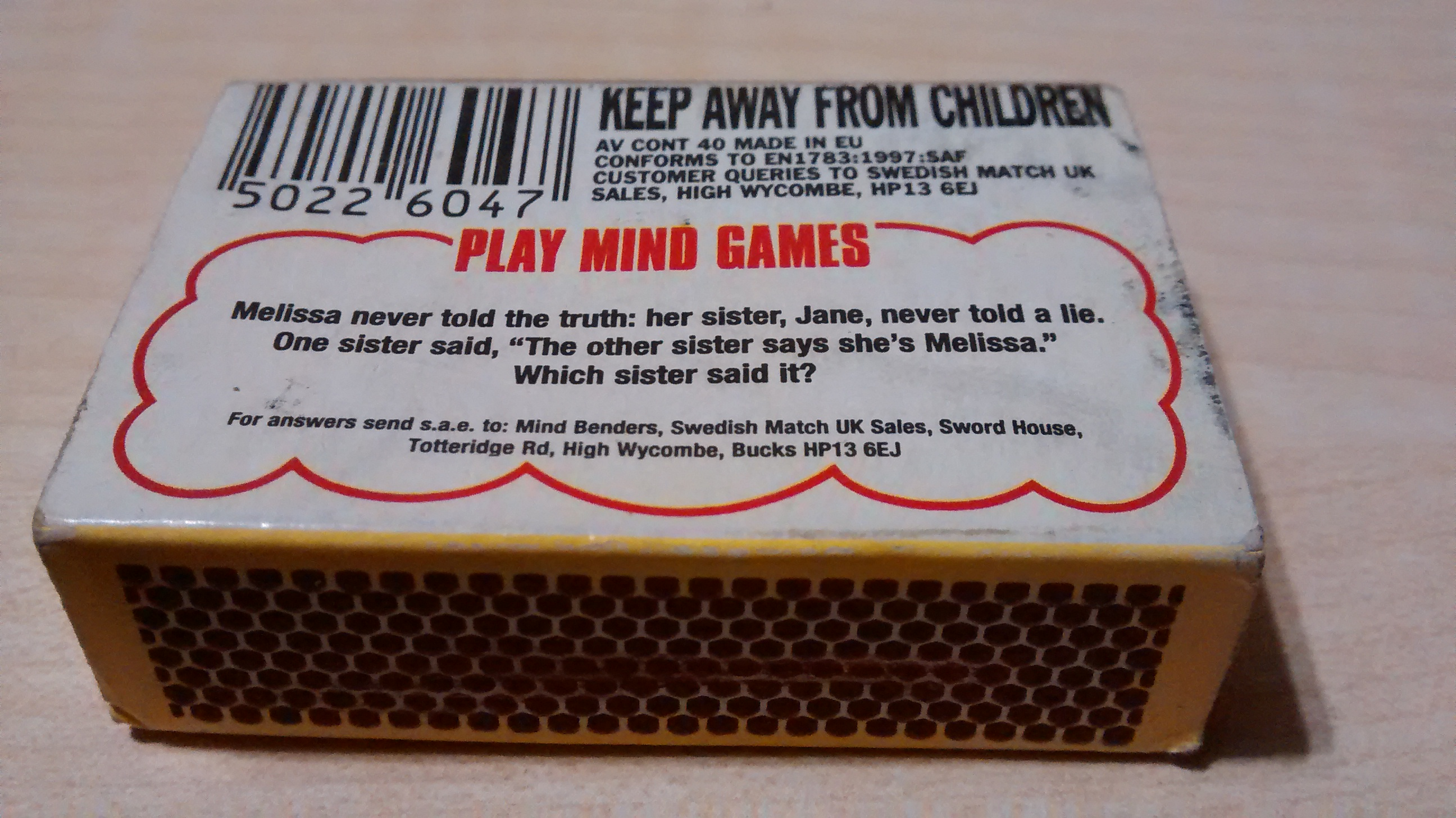
Intellectual pastime on a matchbox

The hobby of collecting match-related items, such as matchcovers and matchbox labels, is known as phillumeny.

== See also ==
- Firelighting
- Ivar Kreuger
- Lighter
- London matchgirls strike of 1888
- Permanent match
- Swedish Match
- "The Little Match Girl", a fairy tale
- The Safety Matches, a 1969 novel
- Ukrainian Match Factory
- Vesta case
- White phosphorus munitions
