= Phossy jaw =

Disease caused by phosphorus exposure

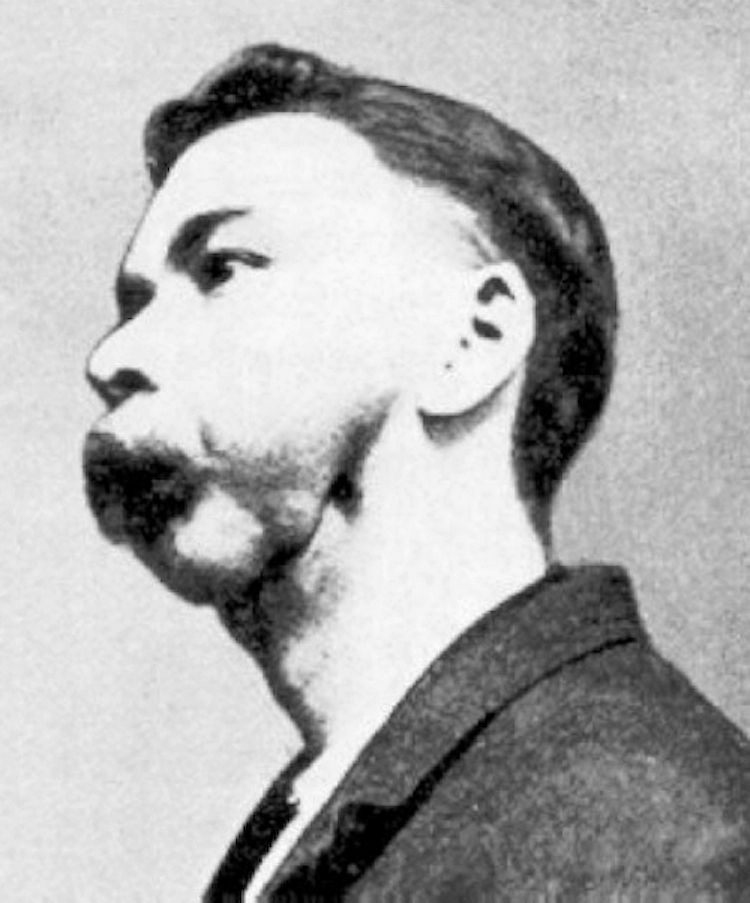
Match factory worker with phossy jaw

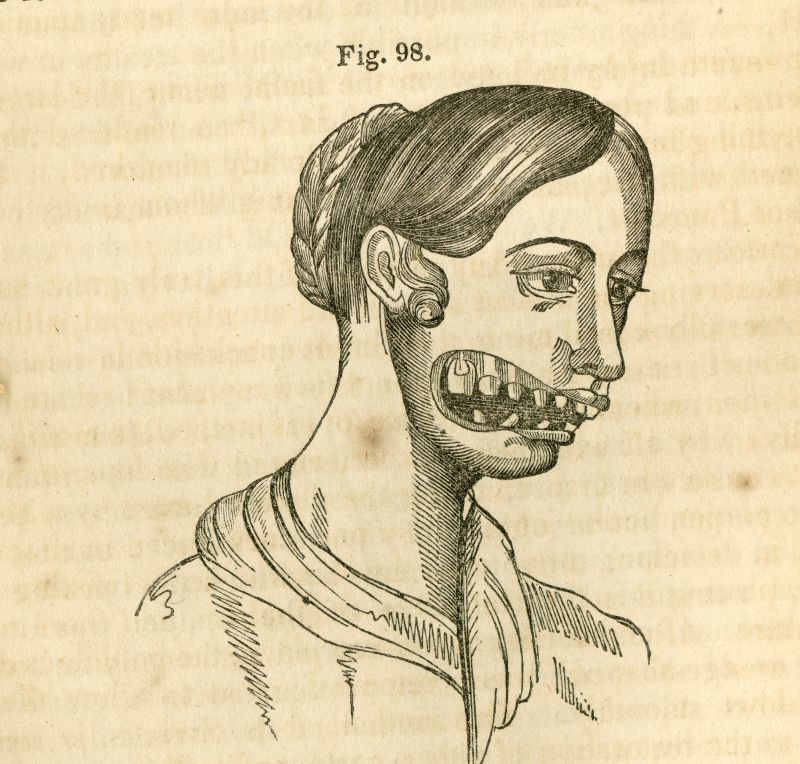
Archival drawing from the 19th century of phossy jaw

Phossy jaw, formally known as phosphorus necrosis of the jaw, was an occupational disease affecting those who worked with white phosphorus (also known as yellow phosphorus) without proper safeguards. It was most commonly seen in workers in the matchstick industry in the 19th and early 20th centuries. It was caused by white phosphorus vapor, which destroys the bones of the jaw. Modern occupational hygiene practices have since eliminated the working conditions that caused this disease.

== Symptoms ==
Those with phossy jaw would usually begin suffering painful toothaches and swelling of the gums. The pain was characterized as "persistent yet progressive ... spreading to neighboring teeth and jawbone". Over time, pus formation developed penetrating the oral mucosa with the formation of fistula, tooth loss, and recurrent abscesses. Further progression led to the formation of sequestrum (dead bone that has separated from living bone) after three months and necrosis of the jaw within six months. The distinguishing feature of this disease was the eventual separation of the sequestrum which was described as porous and light in weight. The lower jaw was more commonly affected than the upper jaw. Affected bones glowed a greenish-white colour in the dark. The condition also affected the brain, provoking seizures in some chronic cases.

== Treatment ==
Treatments included topical antimicrobials, conservative debridement of sequestra and surgery. Surgical removal of the afflicted jaw bones could save the patient; otherwise, death from organ failure would follow. The disease was extremely painful and disfiguring to the patient, with dying bone tissue rotting away accompanied by a foul-smelling discharge. Removal of the jaw bone also had serious effects on patients' ability to eat, leading to further health concerns including malnutrition.

== Diagnostic imaging ==
The clinical features appear first, pain in the teeth and jaw, abscesses, etc. as described above. Once the clinical changes occur and the problem is made known a doctor or dentist could see changes in the jaw bones through radiographs or X-rays. The sequestra, the parts of the bone that die and break off, are light in weight and yellow to brown in color. Thus phossy jaw can be clearly demarcated from similar entities by radiographs. In radiographs, the sequestra present a typical worm-eaten appearance similar to a pumice stone. Sequestra appear osteoporotic and decalcified. Separation of the dead bone from the surrounding bone appears clearly demarcated in the radiographs.

== History ==
=== Discovery ===
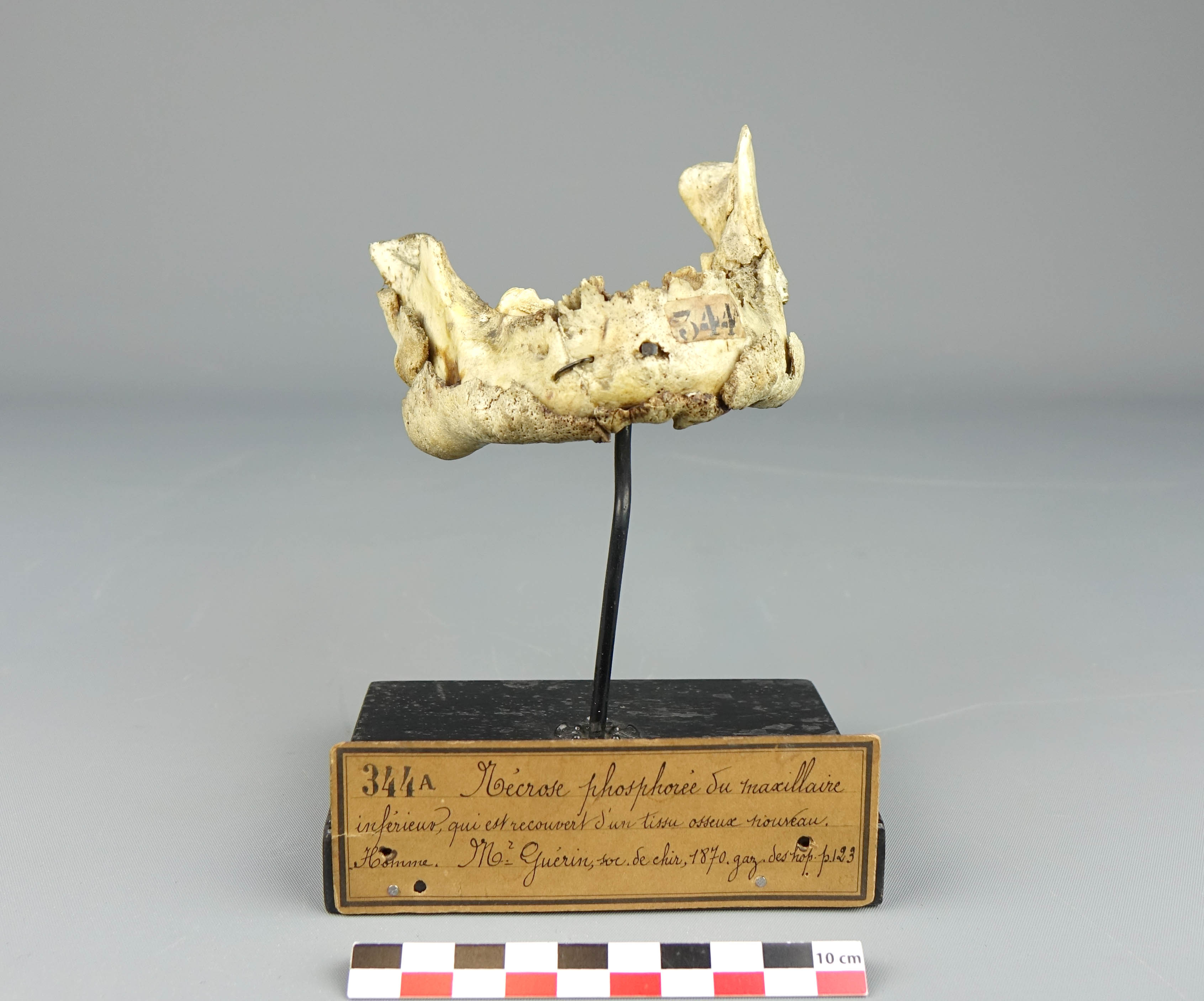
Mandible affected by phossy jaw, 1870 (Sorbonne University)

The first case of phossy jaw was diagnosed in 1839 by Friedrich Wilhelm Lorinser, a doctor in Vienna. The patient was a female Viennese matchstick maker who had been exposed to the phosphorus vapors over a five-year period. He named the disease "Phosphorimus chronicus". In 1844, Lorinser reported 22 cases of phossy jaw and established the toxic effects of white phosphorus in matchsticks.

=== Match industry ===
White phosphorus was the active ingredient of most matches from the 1840s to the 1910s. Concern over phossy jaw contributed to the London matchgirls strike of 1888, and although this strike did not end the use of white phosphorus, William Booth and The Salvation Army opened a match-making factory in 1891 that used the much safer, though more expensive, red phosphorus. The Salvation Army also campaigned with local retailers to get them to sell only red phosphorus matches.

However it was not until the use of white phosphorus was prohibited by the international Berne Convention in 1906 and its provisions were implemented in national laws over the next few years that industrial use ceased.

=== International and national legislation and public organisations ===
==== Europe ====
In 1872, the Grand Duchy of Finland, part of the Russian Empire, was the first country to place an absolute ban on the manufacture, use and sale of white phosphorus in matches; this was followed by Denmark in 1874 and France in 1897. In Great Britain, a ban on white phosphorus matches was introduced by the White Phosphorus Matches Prohibition Act 1908 (8 Edw. 7. c. 42) and became effective on 1 January 1910. The International Association for Labour Legislation (IALL), an international conference, met at Berne, Switzerland, in 1906 and pledged to prohibit the manufacture, importation and sale of white phosphorus matches. This treaty was signed by Finland, Denmark, France, Switzerland, Luxembourg, Italy, the Netherlands and Germany, in what is considered as the first international attempt to ban an industrial product.

==== United States ====
Phossy jaw was publicized by the American Association for Labor Legislation, whose secretary, John B. Andrews, began investigating the disease in 1909 and found more than 100 cases. This report was published in the Bulletin of the Bureau of Labor. The White Phosphorus Match Act of 1912, signed by President William Howard Taft on April 9, 1912, required manufacturers who used white phosphorus to register with district collectors of internal revenue and to file periodic notices and returns, levied a tax of two cents per hundred matches and required makers of white-phosphorus matches to affix revenue stamps to the matchboxes.

==== Asia ====
Russia placed a heavy tax on white phosphorus matches in 1892 which was doubled in 1905. By 1906, the production of white phosphorus matches had been reduced to one match in every fifty. India and Japan banned the use of white phosphorus in 1919 after the United States, followed by China's ban on white phosphorus usage in match production in 1925.

== Mechanism of action ==
In phossy jaw patients, the forensic evidence suggested the conversion of white phosphorus to potent amino bisphosphonates by natural chemical reactions in the human body. White phosphorus has a simple chemistry; when combined with H_{2}O and CO_{2} molecules from respiration and some amino acids such as lysine, bisphosphonates result.

=== Links to bisphosphonates ===
A related condition, medication related osteonecrosis of the jaw (MRONJ), has been described as a side-effect of amino-bisphosphonates, a class of phosphorus-based drugs that inhibit bone resorption and are used widely for treating osteoporosis, bone disease in cancer and some other conditions. BON, sometimes called "bis-phossy jaw", is primarily associated with the use of intravenous bisphosphonates in the treatment of cancer. The percentage incidence of BON from this use is approximately 1000 times higher than the incidence of BON caused by the use of oral bisphosphonates.

== See also ==
- Industrial injury
- Osteonecrosis of the jaw
- Radium jaw
- Radium Girls
