= Gustaf Erik Pasch =

Swedish inventor and professor of chemistry

- Born: 3 September 1788
- Died: 6 September 1862 (aged 74)
- Occupations: Inventor, professor

Gustaf Erik Pasch (born Berggren) (3 September 1788 – 6 September 1862) was a Swedish inventor and professor of chemistry at Karolinska institute in Stockholm and inventor of the safety match. He was born in Norrköping, the son of a carpenter. He enrolled at Uppsala University in 1806 and graduated with a master's degree in 1821. Pasch is mostly known for the safety match, but he was also involved with making waterproof concrete for the Göta Canal, manufacture of bank notes and growing of silk worms. He married Augusta Fredrika Vilhelmina Berg in 1827.

In 1827, he was elected a member of the Royal Swedish Academy of Sciences.

== Safety matches ==
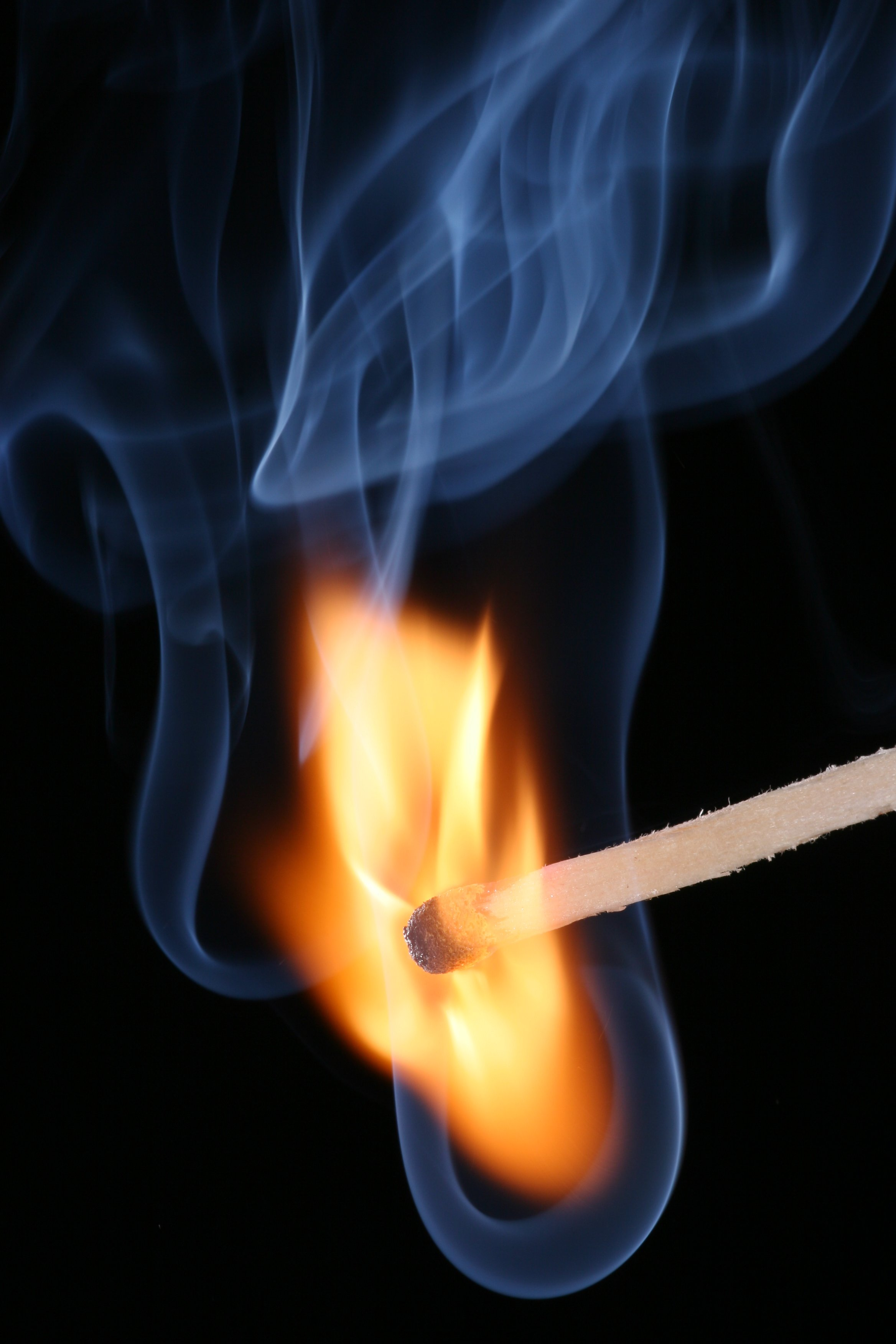
An igniting safety match.

Jöns Jacob Berzelius, who invented the modern chemical notation, discovered that the dangerous white phosphorus in matches could be replaced with the more benign red phosphorus, but was not able to produce a match reliable enough for everyday use. Pasch, a student of Berzelius, managed to do so by moving the phosphorus from the head of the match to a specially prepared striking surface. Pasch was granted a patent on the safety match in 1844.

Manufacturing was started at "J.S. Bagge & co:s Kemiska fabrik" (J.S. Bagge & Company's Chemical Factory) in Stockholm, but ran into difficulties due to the quality of the striking surface. Another problem was that the production of red phosphorus was prohibitively expensive making the final matches very expensive. Because of this, Pasch was unable to commercially exploit his invention and production soon ceased.

It was not until John Edvard Lundström and his younger brother Carl Frans, who took the Pasch design and improved on it that the safety match became commercially successful a decade later, around 1855–60. Lundström's safety match got an award at the 1855 World Fair in Paris.

== Later life ==
Pasch died without getting rich from the invention that would be the fuel of the Kreuger empire. He was however successful in his role as professor and a member of many prominent societies. From 1846 to 1861, Pasch published the annuals of the Swedish silkgrower society. From 1827 to his death he was the secretary of "Kungliga Patriotiska sällskapet" (The Royal Patriot Society).
