= Muath Amarneh =

Palestinian journalist

Muath Amarneh is a Palestinian journalist.

== Biography ==
Amarneh is originally from the Dheisheh refugee camp, in the West Bank, Occupied Palestinian territories. He began developing an interest in photography at the age of 10.

In November 2019, he was shot by the Israeli military while covering clashes between the Israeli authorities and Palestinian anti-settlement demonstrators in Surif, in the West Bank, losing an eye. The Israeli policed denied wrongdoing, saying that they had used non-lethal force to disperse riots and that Amarneh had not been targeted. The incident led to protests by journalists in Palestine and to a sit-in at an Israeli checkpoint in Bethlehem, which was forcibly broken up by the Israeli police. The Committee to Protect Journalists stated that Israeli forces have "repeatedly shown utter disregard for the lives and safety of journalists" in response to the incident. Amarneh was the second Palestinian journalist in 2019 to lose an eye to Israeli forces munitions.

In April 2022, a complaint to the International Criminal Court was filed on Amarneh and three other Palestinian journalists' behalf by the International Federation of Journalists, the Palestinian Journalists Syndicate, and the International Centre of Justice for Palestinians, claiming that Israeli forces systematically targeted Palestinian journalists.

He was arrested by the Israeli military on 16 October 2023, during the Gaza war, and detained for nine months without being charged with any offences. Originally detained in the Megiddo prison, he was transferred to in the Ktzi'ot Prison after six months. While imprisoned, he was infected with scabies as the disease broke out due to the conditions in the prisons where Palestinians were mass detained. Amarneh also claimed that he had been abused during his detention and had been denied medical attention for diabetes. He was released in July 2024.
