= Johan Edvard Lundström =

Swedish industrialist and inventor (1815–1888)

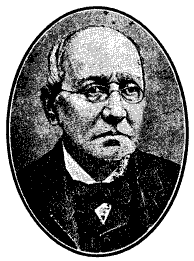
Johan Edvard Lundström (1815–1888).

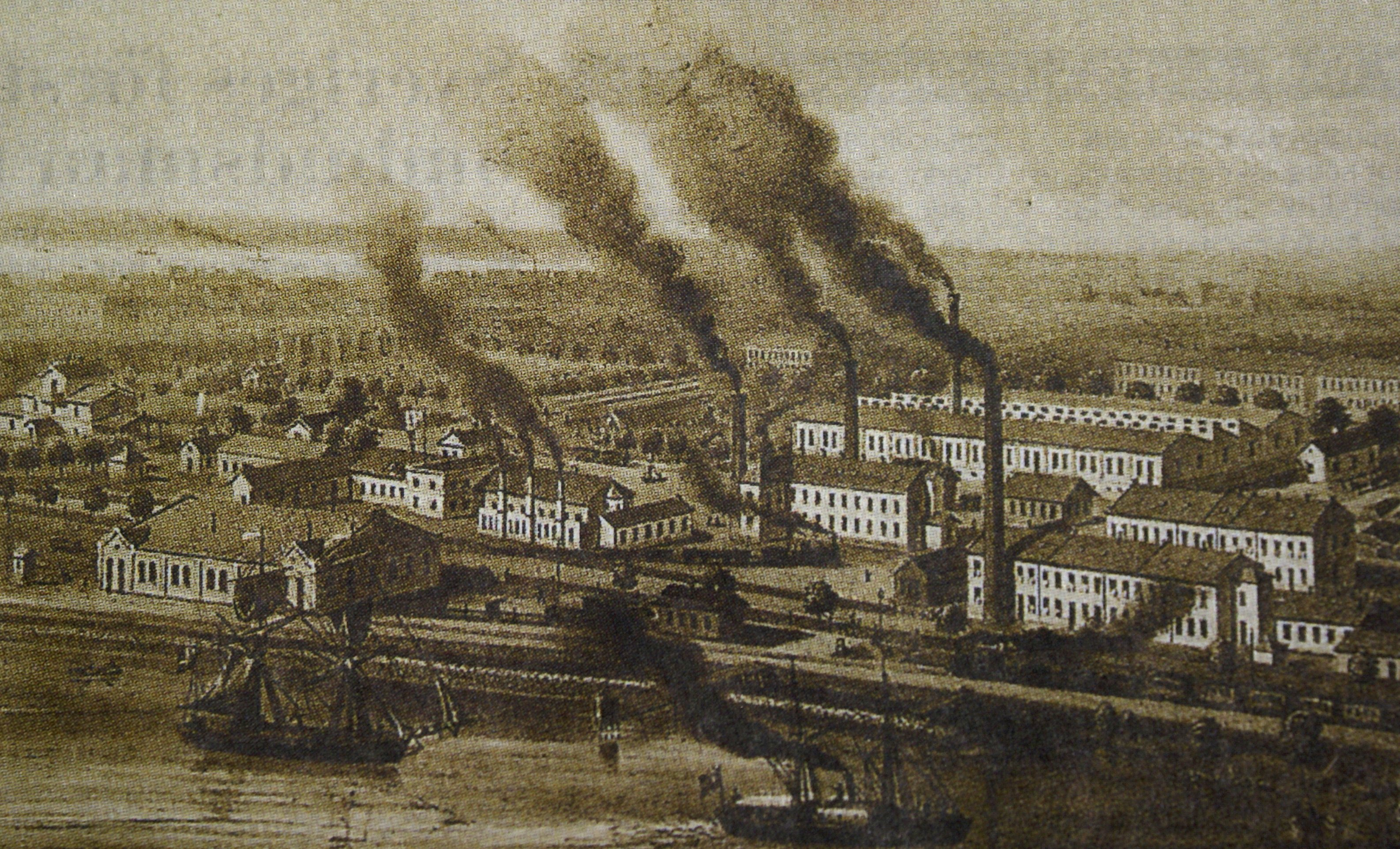
Jönköpings match industry 1872.

Johan Edvard Lundström (1815–1888) was a Swedish industrialist and inventor who pioneered the commercial production of safety matches.

== Biography ==
Lundström was born in 1815 in the town of Jönköping, Sweden.

In 1845 Lundström started to experiment with safety matches in a small workshop he had rented. The safety match had been invented by Gustaf Erik Pasch (1788–1862) in 1844, but was difficult to produce commercially. In 1846 his younger brother Carl Frans Lundström (1823–1917) joined his small workshop. In 1847 they were ready to set up a production plant and bought an estate on the coast of Lake Vättern where they built a large match factory. Today, their original factory is a museum.

The Lundström safety match got an award at the “World Exhibition” in Paris 1855. Alexander Lagerman (1836–1904), a Swedish engineer who was employed by the Lundström brothers, invented the first fully automatic match machine. The safety match combined with the advanced machines that the company developed themselves, soon made the company in Jönköping the largest match company in Scandinavia and one of the world's largest match production companies.

Lundström left the match business in 1863. It was later renamed Jönköping, then in 1903 merged with other match companies to become Jönköpings Tändsticksfabriks AB, finally sold to Ivar Kreuger in 1917. Kreuger incorporated the business into the company Svenska Tändsticks AB, today known as Swedish Match.

Lundström worked at his cellulose factory, Munksjö Cellulose, in Jönköping that he had founded in 1862 together with Lars Johan Hierta. In 1869 he left the Munksjö factory and founded Katrinefors cellulose industry in Mariestad, but left that business in 1875. He then worked as a government inspector in the match industry between 1875–77 in Sweden and was to a great extent involved in the work to prevent and forbid the use of the dangerous white phosphorus.

He died in 1888 at the age of 73, having never married.

== Sources ==
- sv: Nordisk familjebok, 1910. en: Nordic encyklopedia, 1910).
