= Sequestrum =

Separated, dead bone piece during necrosis

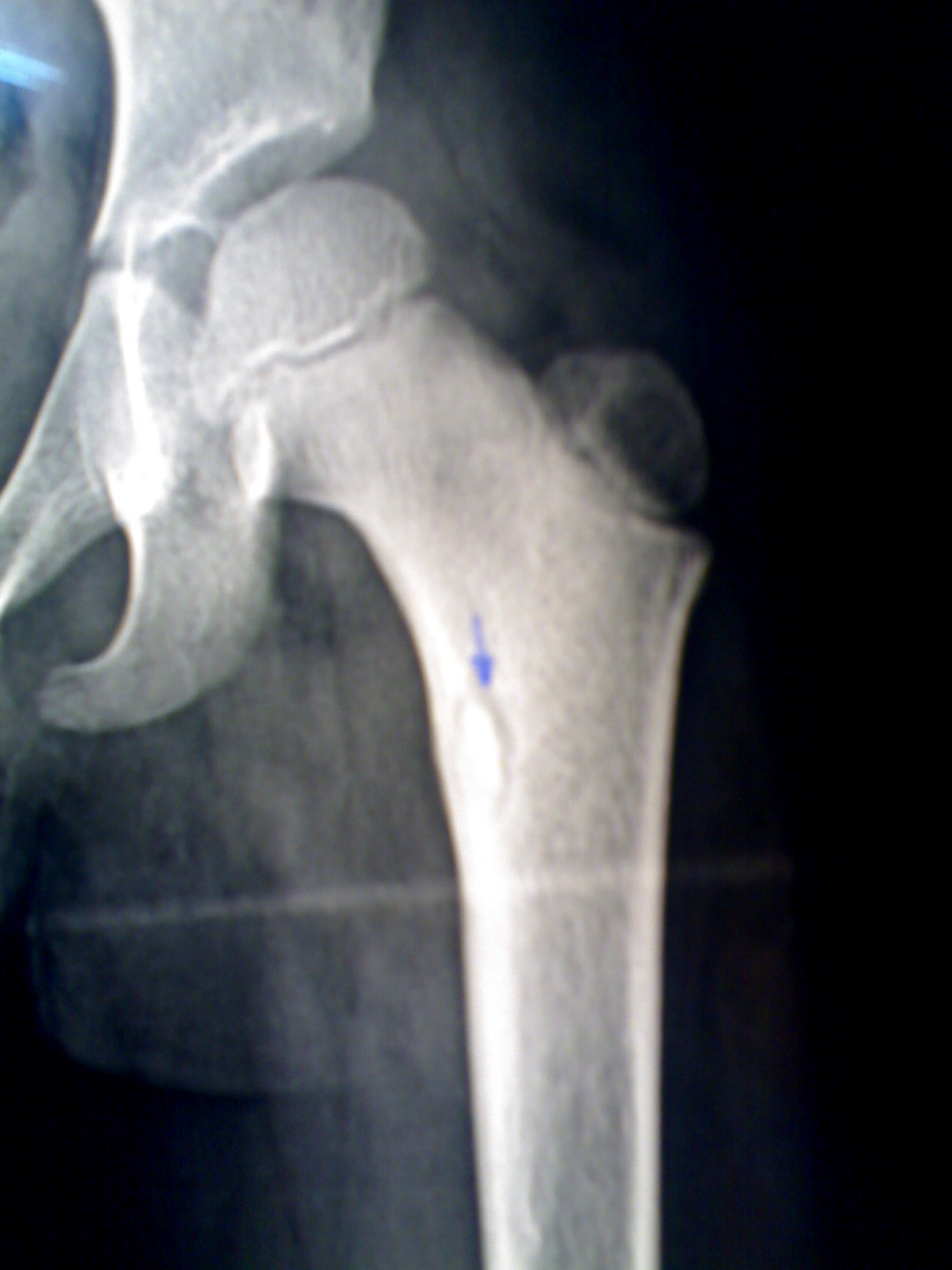
X-ray of a child's femur, showing a bony sequestrum indicated by the blue arrow.

A sequestrum (plural: sequestra) is a piece of dead bone that has become separated during necrosis from normal or sound bone. It is a complication (sequela) of osteomyelitis.

The pathological process is as follows:

- infection in the bone leads to an increase in intramedullary pressure due to inflammatory exudates
- the periosteum becomes stripped from the osteon, leading to vascular thrombosis
- lack of blood supply causes bone necrosis
- sequestra are formed

The sequestra are surrounded by sclerotic bone, which is relatively avascular (without a blood supply). So, antibiotics which travel to sites of infection via the bloodstream poorly penetrate these tissues, hence the difficulty in treating chronic osteomyelitis.

Within the bone itself, the haversian canals become blocked with scar tissue, and the bone becomes surrounded by thickened periosteum. Meantime, new bone (involucrum) forms. Openings in this involucrum allow debris and exudates (including pus) to pass from the sequestrum via sinus tracts to the skin.

Rarely, a sequestrum may turn out to be an osteoid osteoma, a type of bone tumor.
