= Saint-Lothain =

Commune in Bourgogne-Franche-Comté, France

- Commune
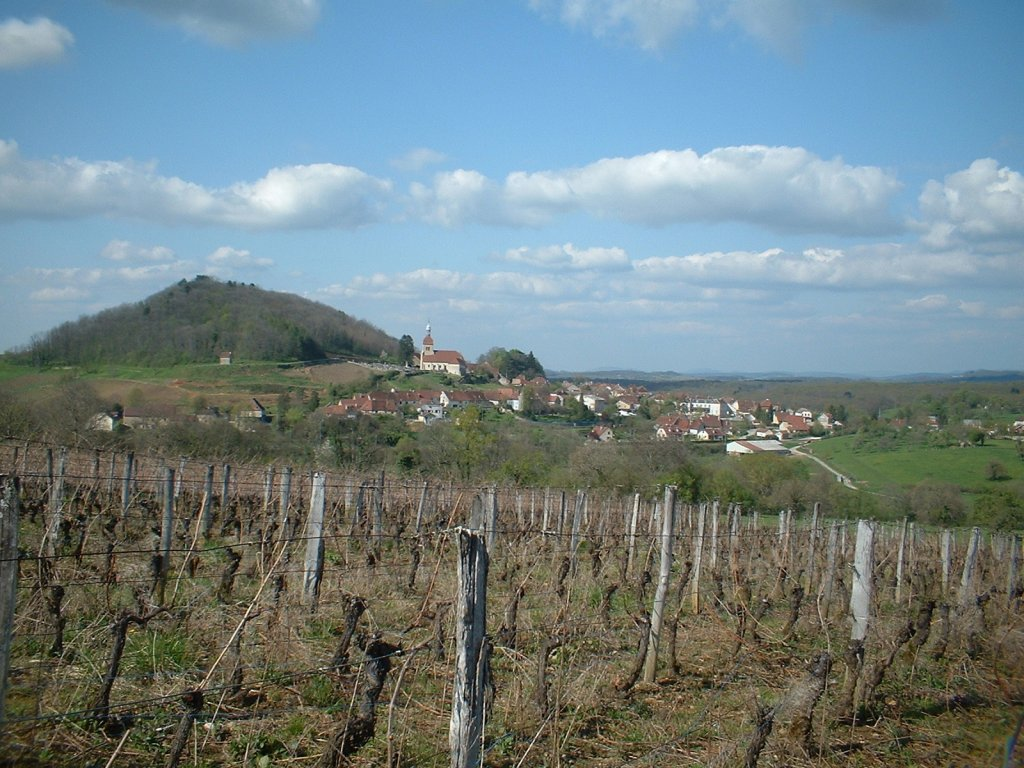
- A general view of Saint-Lothain
- Location of Saint-Lothain
- Location within France Location within Bourgogne-Franche-Comté
- Coordinates: 46°49′34″N 5°38′43″E
- Country: France
- Region: Bourgogne-Franche-Comté
- Department: Jura
- Arrondissement: Dole
- Canton: Bletterans

Government
  - Mayor (2020–2026): Marine Allain
- Area^{1}: 12.33 km^{2} (4.76 sq mi)
- Highest elevation: 480 m (1,570 ft)
- Lowest elevation: 242 m (794 ft)
- Population (2023): 463
  - Density: 37.6/km^{2} (97.3/sq mi)
- Time zone: UTC+01:00 (CET)
  - Summer (DST): UTC+02:00 (CEST)
- INSEE/Postal code: 39489 /39230
- ^{1} French Land Register data, which excludes lakes, ponds, glaciers > 1 km^{2} (0.386 sq mi or 247 acres) and river estuaries.

Saint-Lothain (French pronunciation: [sɛ̃ lɔtɛ̃]) is a commune in the Jura department in the Bourgogne-Franche-Comté region in eastern France.

== Population ==
Historical population
Year	Pop.	±% p.a.
1968	425	—
1975	430	+0.17%
1982	396	−1.17%
1990	418	+0.68%
1999	435	+0.44%
2007	421	−0.41%
2012	466	+2.05%
2017	471	+0.21%
2023	463	−0.29%
Source: INSEE

== See also ==
- Communes of the Jura department
