= Berne Convention (1906) =

1906 multilateral treaty

The Berne Convention (formally, the International Convention respecting the Prohibition of the Use of White (Yellow) Phosphorus in the Manufacture of Matches (French: Convention internationale sur l'interdiction de l'emploi du phosphore blanc (jaune) dans l'industrie des allumettes)) of 1906 is a multilateral treaty negotiated in Berne, Switzerland, which prohibits the use of white phosphorus in the manufacture of matches. The treaty also prohibits the import and sale of such matches.

The background to the treaty was the extensive medical problems such as phossy jaw facing workers in match production. The treaty was concluded on 26 September 1906. It entered into force on 1 January 1912. The Convention remains in force for 48 states. Switzerland is the depositary for the treaty.

In 1925 Edward J. Phelan, future Director General of the International Labour Organization, stated that the establishment of the ILO "may in one sense be traced to the Berne Convention of 1906", partly as a result of lobbying by the International Association for Labour Legislation.

== See also ==
- London matchgirls strike of 1888
