= Khalid Rashid =

Saudi Arabian citizen arrested in 2005

The Speaker of Khitab Khalid Mohammad al Hamad Al Rashid Sheikh
- خالد محمد حمد الراشد
- Succeeded by: Islamic preacher

Personal life
- Born: 1970 (age 55–56) Saudi Arabia
- Children: Abdullah Al Rashid, Khalifa Al Rashid
- Parent: Mohamed Al Rashid (father)
- Era: Modern Era
- Main interest(s): Hadith, Fiqh, Islamic History, Political Analysis, Economics, Social Work, Sufism, Author, Speaker, preacher
- Education: University of Saudi Arabia
- Website: www.khaled-alrashed.com

Religious life
- Religion: Islam
- Denomination: Sunni
- Jurisprudence: Hanbali

Sheikh Khalid Mohammad Hamad Al Rashid is a Saudi Arabian citizen who was arrested in the mid 2000's for his religious expression and associations.

Opinions on the date and reason for Al Rashid's arrest differ. Humans rights organisation Alkarama allege that the Sheikh was arrested on 19 March 2006 in Mecca, during the religious pilgrimage known as Umrah, and state that his family believe the reason for his arrest to be his public comments on government policy. They also note his connection with the so-called "Movement of Reformers" as being a possible reason for his detention. Sanad, another human rights organisation, instead state that he was arrested in 2005 following a sermon protesting Danish cartoons of the Prophet Muhammad.

In 2007, the OHCHR Working Group on Arbitrary Detention opined that Al Rashid's detention is based solely on his political activities and thus contravenes articles 9 and 19 of the Universal Declaration of Human Rights.

Al Rashid was originally sentenced to five years in the prison Al-Hair in Riyadh, Saudi Arabia, but following his appeal in 2009 his sentence was tripled to 15 years. Although his original sentence ended in 2020, his release was delayed and he was instead transferred to the General Directorate of Investigation in November 2021, where he was retried in February 2022 and received an additional sentence of eight years in prison. In November of the same year the Court of Appeals sentenced him to an additional 17 years, for a total of 40 years in prison.
