= Moaaz Alaaeldin =

Egyptian footballer (born 2003)

Personal information
- Full name: Moaaz Alaaeldin
- Date of birth: 27 May 2003 (age 23)
- Position: Goalkeeper

Team information
- Current team: Zamalek

Senior career*
Years	Team	Apps	(Gls)
2020–2024	Misr Lel Makkasa SC		
2024–	Zamalek		
- * Club domestic league appearances and goals

Moaaz Alaaeldin (Arabic: مُعَاذ عَلَاء الدِّين; born 27 May 2003) is an Egyptian professional footballer who plays as a goalkeeper for Egyptian Premier League club Zamalek.
