= White phosphorus =

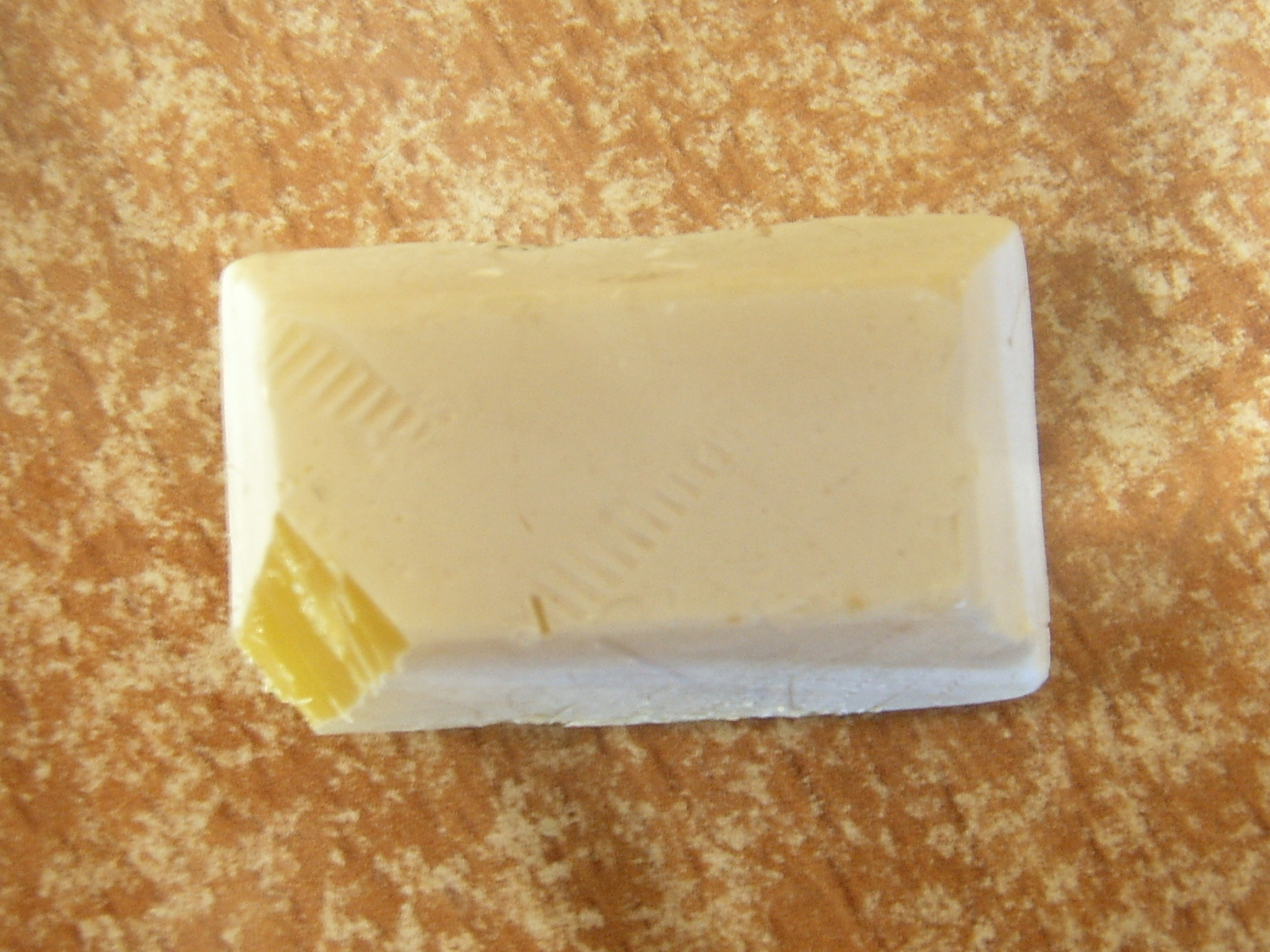
- White phosphorus sample with a chunk removed from the corner to expose un-oxidized material

- Tetraphosphorus molecule

Names
- IUPAC names White phosphorus tetrahedro-Tetraphosphorus
- Systematic IUPAC name 1,2,3,4-Tetraphosphatricyclo[1.1.0.0^{2,4}]butane
- Other names: Molecular phosphorus; Yellow phosphorus

Identifiers
CAS Number	12185-10-3
3D model (JSmol)	Interactive image
ChEBI	CHEBI:35895
ChemSpider	109894
ECHA InfoCard	100.107.967
Gmelin Reference	1856
PubChem CID	123286
UNII	REJ3TH2WED
UN number	1381
CompTox Dashboard (EPA)	DTXSID90923991
- InChI: InChI=1S/P4/c1-2-3(1)4(1)2 Key: OBSZRRSYVTXPNB-UHFFFAOYSA-N
- SMILES: P12P3P1P23

Properties
Chemical formula	P_{4}
Molar mass	123.895 g·mol^{−1}
Density	1.82 g/cm^{3}
Melting point	44.1 °C; 111.4 °F; 317.3 K
Boiling point	280 °C; 536 °F; 553 K

Hazards
- GHS labelling
Pictograms	(GHS02: Flammable) (GHS05: Corrosive) (GHS06: Toxic) (GHS09: Environmental hazard)
Signal word	Danger
Hazard statements	H250, H300+H330, H314, H400
Precautionary statements	P210, P222, P260, P264, P270, P271, P273, P280, P284, P301+P310+P330, P301+P330+P331, P303+P361+P353, P304+P340+P310, P305+P351+P338+P310, P335+P334, P363, P370+P378, P391, P403+P233, P405, P422, P501
NFPA 704 (fire diamond)	4 4 2
Threshold limit value (TLV)	0.1 mg/m^{3}
- Except where otherwise noted, data are given for materials in their standard state (at 25 °C [77 °F], 100 kPa). Infobox references

White phosphorus, yellow phosphorus, or simply tetraphosphorus (P_{4}) is an allotrope of phosphorus. It is a translucent waxy solid that quickly turns yellow in light (due to its photochemical conversion into red phosphorus); for this reason, impure white phosphorus is called yellow phosphorus. White phosphorus is the first allotrope of phosphorus that was discovered, isolated for the first time in 1669 by Henning Brand, a German alchemist. High‑purity white laboratory‑grade samples are usually obtained by redistillation and recrystallization of commercial yellow phosphorus.

When in an oxygen-containing atmosphere, it will exhibit a faint green glow in the absence of light. White phosphorus is also highly flammable and pyrophoric (self-igniting at standard temperature and pressure) upon contact with air. It is toxic, causing severe liver damage upon ingestion and phossy jaw from chronic ingestion or inhalation. The combustion of this form has a characteristic garlic odor, and samples are commonly coated with white "diphosphorus pentoxide", which consists of P_{4}O_{10} tetrahedra with oxygen inserted between the phosphorus atoms and at their vertices. White phosphorus is only slightly soluble in water and can be stored under water. P_{4} is soluble in benzene, oils, carbon disulfide, and disulfur dichloride.

== Structure ==
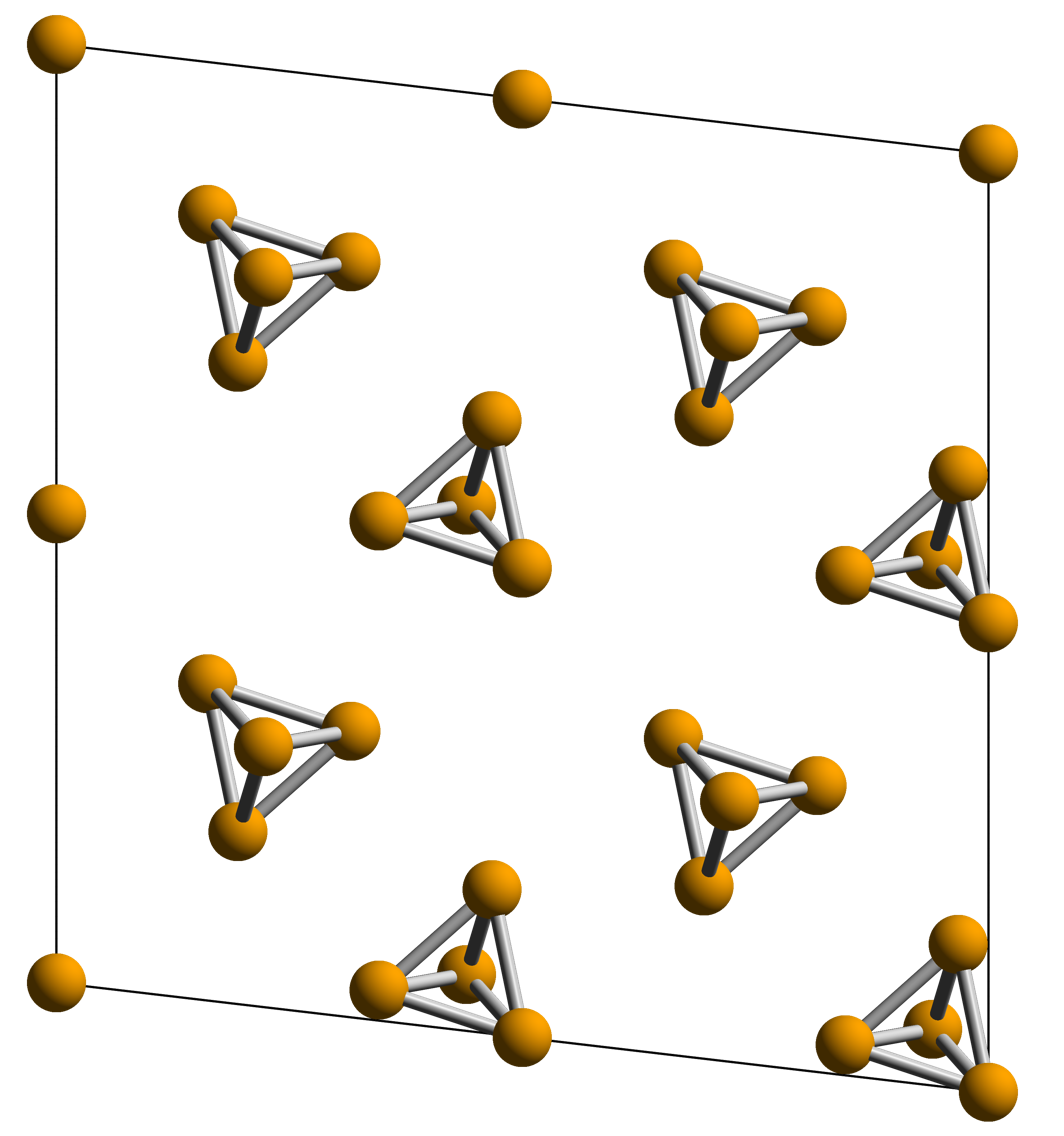
White phosphorus crystal structure

White phosphorus exists as molecules of four phosphorus atoms in a tetrahedral structure, with each phosphorus atom making three phosphorus—phosphorus single bonds for a total of six P-P bonds per tetrahedron. The tetrahedral arrangement results in ring strain and instability. White phosphorus can take on one of two crystal allotropes that interechange reversibly above 195.2 K (−78.0 °C; −108.3 °F). The element's standard state is the body-centered cubic α form, which is metastable under standard conditions. The β form is believed to have a hexagonal crystal structure.

Molten and gaseous white phosphorus are also composed of these tetrahedra until 800 °C (1,500 °F; 1,100 K) when they start decomposing into P_{2} molecules. The P_{4} molecule in the gas phase has a P-P bond length of r_{g} = 2.1994(3) Å as was determined by gas electron diffraction. The β form of white phosphorus contains three slightly different P_{4} molecules, i.e. 18 different P-P bond lengths — between 2.1768(5) and 2.1920(5) Å. The average P-P bond length is 2.183(5) Å.

== Chemical properties ==
Despite white phosphorus not being the most stable allotrope of phosphorus (see: black phosphorus), it is still used as the reference state for solid phosphorus and defined to have a standard enthalpy of formation of zero. This is because it is much easier to handle and purify for the purposes of collecting reference thermodynamic data.

In basic media, white phosphorus spontaneously disproportionates to phosphine and various phosphorus oxyacid salts.

Many reactions of white phosphorus involve insertion into the P-P bonds, such as the reactions with oxygen, sulfur, phosphorus tribromide and the NO^{+} ion.

It ignites spontaneously in air at about 50 °C (122 °F), and at much lower temperatures if finely divided (due to melting-point depression). Phosphorus reacts with oxygen, usually forming two oxides depending on the amount of available oxygen: P_{4}O_{6} (phosphorus trioxide) when reacted with a limited supply of oxygen, and P_{4}O_{10} when reacted with excess oxygen. On rare occasions, P_{4}O_{7}, P_{4}O_{8}, and P_{4}O_{9} are also formed, but in small amounts. This combustion gives phosphorus(V) oxide:

P_{4} + 5 O_{2} → P_{4}O_{10}

== Production and applications ==
The white allotrope can be produced using several methods. In the industrial process, phosphate rock is heated in an electric or fuel-fired furnace in the presence of carbon and silica. Elemental phosphorus is then liberated as a vapour and can be collected under phosphoric acid. An idealized equation for this carbothermal reaction is shown for calcium phosphate (although phosphate rock contains substantial amounts of fluoroapatite, which would also form silicon tetrafluoride):

2 Ca_{3}(PO_{4})_{2} + 6 SiO_{2} + 10 C → 6 CaSiO_{3} + 10 CO + P_{4}

In this way, an estimated 750,000 tons were produced in 1988.

Most (83% in 1988) white phosphorus is used as a precursor to phosphoric acid, half of which is used for food or medical products where purity is important. The other half is used for detergents. Much of the remaining 17% is mainly used for the production of chlorinated compounds phosphorus trichloride, phosphorus oxychloride, and phosphorus pentachloride:

P_{4} + 10Cl_{2} → 4PCl_{5}

Other products derived from white phosphorus include phosphorus pentasulfide and various metal phosphides.

White phosphorus is also used to make glyphosate, the active ingredient in Roundup herbicide and munitions. In the United States, Bayer is the sole producer of elemental phosphorus.

== Other polyhedrane analogues ==
Although white phosphorus forms the tetrahedron, the simplest possible Platonic solid, no other polyhedral phosphorus clusters are known. White phosphorus converts to the thermodynamically more stable red allotrope, but that allotrope is not composed of isolated polyhedra.

A cubane-type cluster, in particular, is unlikely to form, and the closest approach is the half-phosphorus compound P_{4}(CH)_{4}, produced from phosphaalkynes. Other clusters are more thermodynamically favorable, and some have been partially formed as components of larger polyelemental compounds.

== Safety ==
White phosphorus is acutely toxic, with a lethal dose of 50-100 mg (1 mg/kg body weight). Its mode of action is not known but is thought to involve its reducing properties, possibly forming intermediate reducing compounds such as hypophosphite, phosphite, and phosphine. It damages the liver, kidneys, and other organs before eventually being metabolized to non-toxic phosphate. Chronic low-level exposure leads to tooth loss and phossy jaw which appears to be caused by the formation of amino bisphosphonates.

White phosphorus is used as a weapon because it is pyrophoric. For the same reasons, it is dangerous to handle. Measures are taken to protect samples from air since it will react with oxygen at ambient temperatures, and even in small samples this can lead to self-heating and eventual combustion. There are anecdotal reports of problems for beachcombers who may collect washed-up samples while unaware of their true nature.
