= Kate Sclater =

British trade unionist

Kate Sclater (or Slater; married name Kate Furnell; 20 October 1863 – 1950) was a British trade unionist and match packer. She was among the leaders of the 1888 Matchgirls' strike, and one of the first members of the strike committee.

== Personal life ==
Kate Sclater was born in Southampton in 1863, the daughter of Ellen Jane (née Blake) and William Sipping Sclater. She was baptised on 24 January 1864. The family moved to London sometime between May 1873 and October 1874.

Sclater married George Godby Furnell in 1889.

== Role in the Matchgirls' Strike ==
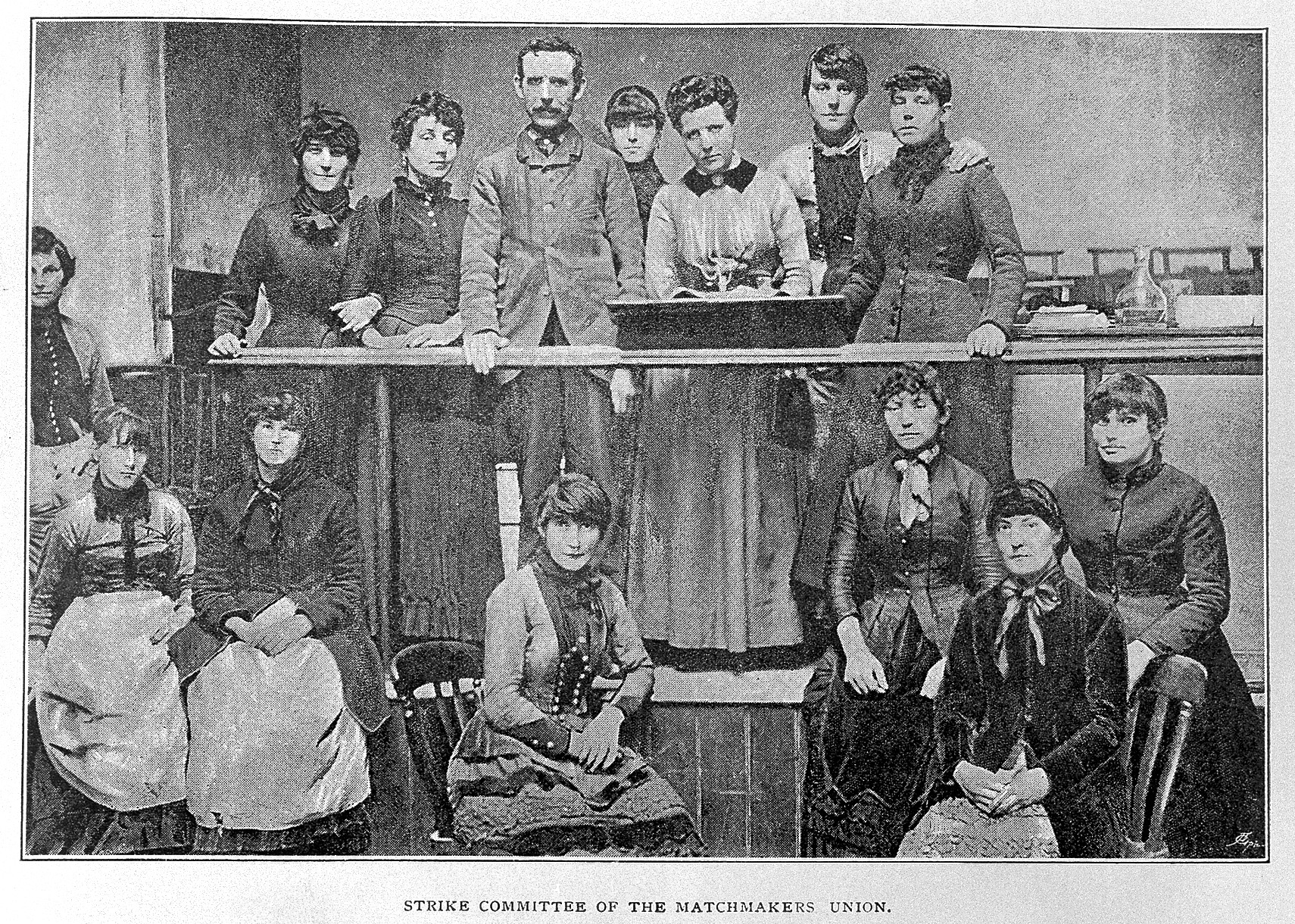
Strike committee

As a match packer at the Bryant & May match factory, Sclater suffered the poor working conditions, low pay, and risk of disease (particularly phossy jaw) publicly exposed in an article published by Annie Besant on 23 June 1888. Shortly afterwards, initially protesting the dismissal of a worker suspected of speaking to Besant, strike action was initiated. This continued and evolved into a broader protest, demanding better pay and fairer practices, involving 1400 workers. In a document discovered in 1999, Sclater was named on a list of suspected ringleaders of the strike, along with Eliza Martin, Alice Francis, Mary Driscoll, and Jane Wakeling.

Ultimately, Bryant & May agreed to all of the strikers' demands. On 27 July 1888, the inaugural meeting of the Union of Women Match Makers was held, with Sclater on the committee. The match women have been called "mothers" of the modern labour movement, helping to secure better working conditions, better pay, and inspiring subsequent industrial action.

== Legacy ==
John Emsley wrote that Sclater and the women who formed the strike committee "had their fifteen minutes of glory, changed the world for ever — and were never heard of again." However, particularly since the mid-20th century, there has been a revival in interest in the strikers and their legacy.

The lead character of Robert Mitchell's 1940 play The Match Girls, written for the Unity Theatre, was called Kate. Mitchell's research had included speaking to survivors of the Strike, so it is possible that the character was inspired by Kate Sclater. 1966 saw two British musicals about the strike: The Matchgirls by Bill Owen and Tony Russell, and Strike a Light! by Joyce Adcock and Gordon Caleb.

In recognition of its value for education and historical research, the Register of the 1888 strike, held in the Trade Union Congress Library collections, has been digitised. It as acknowledged as being "one of the few episodes from British labor history that is taught in schools and is known to the general public."

In 2021, Sclater was among those remembered by name in an Early day motion in Parliament, remembering the Matchgirls as "pioneers of gender equality and fairness at work who through their strike action and formation of the Union of Women Match Makers left a lasting legacy on the trade union movement". In the same year, a series of short films were commissioned by Southampton Music Hub and The Matchgirls Memorial Trust, the first of which focused on the experience of Kate Sclater.

Following the discovery by researchers in 2020 that Sclater was born and brought up in Southampton, a campaign to have a memorial plaque erected for her there was initiated.
