= List of Ripper Street episodes =

Ripper Street is a BBC fictional drama based in Whitechapel following on from the infamous murders of Jack the Ripper. The first episode was broadcast on 30 December 2012. A second series was confirmed in January 2013, with the first episode being broadcast on 28 October 2013. The third series was produced by Amazon Prime Instant Video and uploaded weekly onto the Amazon UK site from November 2014. A fourth series, again produced by Amazon Prime Instant Video, began airing weekly on the service, beginning 15 January 2016. This series was originally expected to consist of eight episodes, but ended up consisting of seven, including a feature-length premiere of 130 minutes that was split into two episodes for television broadcast. The concluding fifth series was released in full on Amazon Prime UK on 12 October 2016. It includes six episodes featuring a runtime of 60 to 75 minutes. During the course of the programme, 37 episodes of Ripper Street aired over five series.

== Series overview ==
| Series | Episodes | Originally released | |
| Series | Episodes | First released | Last released |
|---|---|---|---|
| 1 | 8 | 30 December 2012 | 24 February 2013 |
| 2 | 8 | 28 October 2013 | 16 December 2013 |
| 3 | 8 | 14 November 2014 | 26 December 2014 |
| 4 | 7 | 15 January 2016 | 19 February 2016 |
| 5 | 6 | 12 October 2016 | 12 October 2016 |

== Episodes ==
=== Series 1 (2012–13) ===
The first series is set in 1889.

| No. overall | No. in series | Title | Directed by | Written by | Original release date | UK viewers (millions) |
|---|---|---|---|---|---|---|
| 1 | 1 | "I Need Light" | Tom Shankland | Richard Warlow | 30 December 2012 | 7.89 |
When the body of violinist Maude Thwaites is found, it bears all the hallmarks of a Ripper killing. However, an autopsy by Jackson suggests it is a copy-cat killing. Despite opposition from journalist Fred Best (David Dawson) and Chief Inspector Frederick Abberline (Clive Russell), Detective Inspector Reid and his team enter into the world of Sir Arthur Donaldson (Mark Dexter), a pioneer in early photographic pornography and producer/star of one of the first 'snuff films', after discovering motion film of Thwaites being strangled. The investigation becomes more urgent when it is discovered that Donaldson purchased the services of Rose (who had already appeared in risque photos) and another prostitute.
| 2 | 2 | "In My Protection" | Tom Shankland | Richard Warlow | 6 January 2013 | 6.94 |
Ernest Manby (David Coon), a 63-year-old toy maker is found beaten to death. George Lusk (Michael Smiley) and the Whitechapel Vigilance Committee claim that 14-year-old Thomas Gower (Giacomo Mancini) is responsible. Reid's conscience is challenged by a radical lawyer Eagles (Hugh O'Conor), a friend and confidant of Reid's wife, and orphanage governess Deborah Goren (Lucy Cohu) and it leads to Gower being put under the protection of Reid. Jackson’s drinking and gambling have led to the loss of the ring that ties him and Long Susan to their American past. The two events lead to the death of Eagles and a dangerous task for Long Susan to recover the ring from a gambling den run by Carmichael (Joe Gilgun) who uses his vicious child gang to attack Miss Goren’s orphanage, seeking to kill Gower sheltering there with Reid and Drake, the location having been given up by Jackson when he and Long Susan are captured by Carmichael.
| 3 | 3 | "The King Came Calling" | Andy Wilson | Declan Croghan and Richard Warlow | 13 January 2013 | 6.54 |
Fear of the return of "King" cholera joins Whitechapel's H Division and the independent City of London police forces amid the panic. Captain Jackson's autopsy discounts cholera and indicates St Anthony's Fire caused by wilful contamination of food in both boroughs. Inspector Sydney Ressler (Patrick Baladi) joins Reid’s team as they scour Whitechapel for clues and connections of five dead City of London workers that include transvestism and homosexuality. Reid's wife seeks patronage for her charity efforts and is rebuffed and succumbs to the same illness, seeing her dead daughter in her delirium. As Jackson’s lab fills with bodies, and with no clear connection between the victims to be found, the team works against the clock to find some underlying pattern amidst the rising tide of sickness and death.
| 4 | 4 | "The Good of This City" | Andy Wilson | Julie Rutterford and Richard Warlow | 20 January 2013 | 6.95 |
The clearing of a Whitechapel slum for the underground railway by progressive councillor Stanley J. Bone (Paul McGann) of the new LCC reveals a murder scene of two bodies, two young children in an adjoining room and an unreliable girl witness. Lucy Eames (Emma Rigby), a beautiful, disturbed, three months pregnant former 16-year-old prostitute at Long Susan's brothel, is the centre of a complex web of conspiracy which involves benevolent Dr. Karl Crabbe (Anton Lesser), a leading psychiatrist specialising in lobotomies. Reid discovers one killer is someone he knows and the mystery children are taken from the safety of Miss Goren's (Lucy Cohu) orphanage as Reid closes in on a solution that leads to corruption and abuse by seemingly respectable individuals.
| 5 | 5 | "The Weight of One Man's Heart" | Colm McCarthy | Toby Finlay | 27 January 2013 | 6.47 |
A military-style robbery is a puzzle to Detective Inspector Reid when the stolen gems are returned – save for one blue sapphire. Drake's heart has fallen for Rose, and he hopes for a life with her, despite warnings from Reid and Jackson. She, however, has dreams of being an actress. Drake is confronted with his past when his former commanding officer during the Mahdist War, Colonel Madoc Faulkner (Iain Glen) returns to London to seek compensation for the 'unjust' treatment of the British army's soldiers by planning an audacious robbery of the Royal Mint, requiring Drake's help to gain entry. Reid closes in on the robbers and Drake finds his loyalties put to the test.
| 6 | 6 | "Tournament of Shadows" | Colm McCarthy | Toby Finlay | 3 February 2013 | 6.31 |
With the London Dock Strike of 1889 leading to protests in the streets of London, the killing of Jewish anarchist Joshua Bloom (Ferdinand Kingsley) in a bomb explosion and the wrecking of the International Working Men's Club in Berner Street sees Reid and the team fighting international terrorism led by Russian spy Peter Morris (Peter Ferdinando). Jackson, using his Pinkerton experience, goes undercover to infiltrate the strikers but Reid is warned off the case by Commissioner James Monro (Michael McElhatton) and Superintendent Constantine (Derek Riddell) of Special Branch who seems to have prior knowledge of Morris' activities, Jackson's past and Reid's daughter's death. When his wife tells Reid to clear their daughter Mathilda's bedroom, he opens up to Miss Goren, telling her of the circumstances of how he received burns to his body when his daughter disappeared, and stating that he believes she is still alive.
| 7 | 7 | "A Man of My Company" | Andy Wilson | Richard Warlow | 17 February 2013 | 6.10 |
An international shipping magnate, Theodore P Swift (Ian McElhinney), arrives in London with his Pinkerton retinue to complete the acquisition of an ailing London shipping line. The leader of the visiting Pinkerton clan, Frank Goodnight (Edoardo Ballerini), badly wants to find Captain Homer Jackson. Jackson, however, doesn’t wish to be found. Meanwhile the murdered body of an engineer, inventor of a new ship's engine that could save the ailing company, draws Reid's attention just as Jackson and Long Susan's past comes back to haunt them. Reid's investigation of the engineer's wife (Shauna Macdonald), has disastrous results for Constable Hobbs and Goodnight's handiwork places Jackson under the suspicion of Chief Inspector Abberline when a prostitute is found murdered in the same manner as the Ripper's victims.
| 8 | 8 | "What Use Our Work?" | Andy Wilson | Richard Warlow | 24 February 2013 | 6.44 |
Reid is adrift and his team in pieces and Leman Street is shaken to its foundations following recent events. With Abberline convinced that Jackson is The Ripper, the captain is in custody and facing the death penalty. Reid is convinced of Jackson's innocence, and brings in Joseph Lavender (Linal Haft) who had seen The Ripper with one of his victims the previous year, but Lavender proves not to be the key to Jackson's release from custody. Reid seeks solace with Miss Goren and Drake with Bella, one of Long Susan's girls. Rose leaves the brothel to stay at Mrs Reid's shelter and, through a newspaper lonely hearts page, she seeks out a wealthy husband. When Rose disappears, Reid and Drake suspect that a white slavery ring is operating in their midst, with previous Ripper suspect, Victor Silver (David Oakes), at its head. Reid reveals Silver was one of the missing victims from the boat accident that he and his daughter were on. Silver is assisted in his work by his sister Clara (Ruta Gedmintas) and brother Barnaby (Kristian Nairn). Jackson is eventually given the chance to prove to everyone (most importantly Abberline) that he is not Jack the Ripper. Reid, Drake and Jackson are left free to continue cleaning up the streets of Whitechapel.

=== Series 2 (2013) ===
The second series is set in 1890.

| No. overall | No. in series | Title | Directed by | Written by | Original release date | UK viewers (millions) |
|---|---|---|---|---|---|---|
| 9 | 1 | "Pure as the Driven" | Tom Shankland | Richard Warlow | 28 October 2013 | 6.45 |
When a sergeant from the neighbouring police district, Limehouse, is hurled from a tenement window onto the iron railings below, Reid finds himself thrown into the murky trade of legal opium in Chinatown which is being converted in Whitechapel into a new opiate, heroin, with seemingly the help of the amoral Detective Inspector Jedediah Shine (Joseph Mawle), head of K Division, Limehouse, who had previously spent 10 years with the Hong Kong police. Reid, taunted by Shine as "pure as the driven", finds himself accused of killing the sergeant at the Whitechapel hospital where the only witness might be Joseph Merrick (Joseph Drake), the Elephant Man.
| 10 | 2 | "Am I Not Monstrous?" | Tom Shankland | Richard Warlow | 4 November 2013 | 5.48 |
A young woman, Stella Brooks, is murdered at the Whitechapel Hospital shortly after giving birth and her baby taken. The woman has an unusual deformity that leads Reid to freak shows and, seeking help from Joseph Merrick, finds him terrified after an unbeknown visit from Inspector Jedediah Shine who also appears involved in the case. Jackson discovers Long Susan is in debt to Silas Duggan (Frank Harper), another friend of Shine's. Suspect John Goode was twice an inmate of Dr Karl Crabbe's asylum. Merrick, who can exonerate Reid, dies mysteriously in his sleep and the murder of Shine's sergeant is unproven. (In the show, Shine murdered Merrick by forcing him to lie down which caused him to suffocate; in real life, he was presumed to have lied down voluntarily which led to suffocation and then death; the show presents the alternative theory that Merrick was murdered.)
| 11 | 3 | "Become Man" | Christopher Menaul | Marnie Dickens | 11 November 2013 | 5.03 |
Female kidnappers, supporters of Jane Cobden (Leanne Best), one of the first London County Councillors, take a prominent member of the council from his table at the music hall where Rose Erskine now works as a waitress. They strike again at the Tenter Street brothel, taking a lawyer from the brothel along with Long Susan. The lawyer is identified as Thomas Ely by Rose and Drake's new wife, Bella, as a client when they worked as prostitutes at the brothel. A third kidnap victim presents Reid with a link to the London matchgirls strike of 1888.
| 12 | 4 | "Dynamite and a Woman" | Christopher Menaul | Jamie Crichton and Richard Warlow | 18 November 2013 | N/A |
An Irish bomber, Aiden Galvin (Stanley Townsend), is sprung from a prison wagon when the driver seemingly has a heart attack and barely a day later a prominent M.P., an opponent of the Home Rule movement, is murdered. Chief Inspector Abberline is convinced that the Irish Republican Brotherhood is active once more and orders Reid to send the DC Flight (Damien Molony) undercover into Whitechapel's Irish community to befriend Galvin's beloved daughter. Jackson's forensic examination of the two deaths points to rival electrical companies competing to build a power station.
| 13 | 5 | "Threads of Silk and Gold" | Kieron Hawkes | Thomas Martin and Toby Finlay | 25 November 2013 | 4.27 |
The strangling of a Telegraph Boy lifts the lid on the telegraph boys prostituting themselves and blackmailing their clients, chief among them Vincent Featherwell (Jassa Ahluwalia). The investigation leads Reid to Barings Bank and the apparent suicide of one of its employees and a missing folio of the Bank's business in an economic disaster in Argentina that would bankrupt the bank. Fred Best, one of the boys' clients, becomes involved as Reid's instrument of justice when the law fails. Jackson's means of ridding himself and Long Susan of the debt they owe the moneylender, Silas Duggan, backfires when he loses all their money in Argentine stocks.
| 14 | 6 | "A Stronger Loving World" | Kieron Hawkes | Toby Finlay | 2 December 2013 | 4.18 |
Attacks on churches and synagogues threatens to break the fragile peace between Whitechapel's religious communities. Bella Drake's 'uncle', Gabriel Cain (Paul Kaye), a charismatic scholar, and former member of the Hermetic Order of the Golden Dawn, with a group of fanatical followers of his unorthodox occult beliefs of Elizabethan astrologer John Dee seek to convert Drake. Rose Erskine, seeking financial help from penniless Long Susan, falls foul of the same group. Reid is astonished to find a photograph of Bella as Cain's holy queen and pregnant. Tragedy befalls Drake when he, Bella, and Rose are brought together to take part in the groups intention to commit mass suicide.
| 15 | 7 | "Our Betrayal – Part 1" | Andy Wilson | Richard Warlow | 9 December 2013 | N/A |
Rose searches for a missing Drake. Jackson's brother, Daniel Judge (David Costabile), arrives with a stolen rough diamond from a South African mining company. Long Susan has pressing matters when Silas Duggan moves into Tenter Street intent on taking her absent husband's place. Reid and Flight investigate a confidence trickster who has cheated jeweler Nathaniel Hinchcliffe and under the protection of Inspector Shine seems untouchable. Jackson believes the diamond will solve his problems with Long Susan but agents of the mining company seek its return. Reid's investigation of the confidence trickster is undermined by betrayal and a coincidence brings Drake back to Leman Street with the body of Hinchcliffe.
| 16 | 8 | "Our Betrayal – Part 2" | Andy Wilson | Richard Warlow | 16 December 2013 | 4.63 |
Three corpses found in a slum tenement murdered in the same way as Hinchcliffe lead Reid, by Flight's testimony, to Inspector Shine's doorstep. Identifying the corpses leads to a property trail and Silas Duggan whom Jackson's brother wants to sell the stolen diamond. Unable to prosecute Shine or Duggan, Jackson and Long Susan see a way to gain revenge on Duggan while Reid seeks Shine's demise in a boxing match with Drake.

=== Series 3 (2014) ===
The third series is set in 1894.

| No. overall | No. in series | Title | Directed by | Written by | Original release date | UK viewers (millions) |
|---|---|---|---|---|---|---|
| 17 | 1 | "Whitechapel Terminus" | Andy Wilson | Richard Warlow | 14 November 2014 (Amazon); 31 July 2015 (BBC One) | 5.60 |
A locomotive disaster right on Reid's doorstep brings unexpected consequences for Whitechapel. A daring robbery is attempted and is successful but not without causing a serious accident. As Police get closer and closer to the perpetrators, they are faced with an agonising decision. While Reid fights to restore peace to Whitechapel's blood-stained streets, his former team is regrouping. Elsewhere, Susan has created a business out of her brothel and this inevitably brings her to the inspector's attention.
| 18 | 2 | "The Beating of Her Wings" | Andy Wilson | Toby Finlay | 14 November 2014 (Amazon); 7 August 2015 (BBC One) | 4.95 |
A murder inquiry in a curiosity shop brings trouble to Reid's and Susan's doorstep and the discovery of a captive girl. The story of misgivings and intimidation haunts the Police as they try to figure out who the murderer is. Susan, as ever, is not far away and springs her own trap for the inspector. As the horrible truth is slowly revealed, Reid must control himself as he tries to save the girl who seems to hold all the answers.
| 19 | 3 | "Ashes and Diamonds" | Anthony Byrne | Toby Finlay | 21 November 2014 (Amazon); 14 August 2015 (BBC One) | 4.28 |
Alexander Le Cheyne, a mysterious clairvoyant is found dead at the local performance place. Jackson presumes poison has a part to play and sure enough in the autopsy he discovers Hydrogen Cyanide. As Reid is missing Drake steps in to investigate and arrests Alex's sidekick Ezra as a fraud. As the investigation continues a damsel who strings up men alive and three affairs are discovered. Meanwhile Drake finds his loyalties tested and gets closer to solving a very intricate puzzle. Elsewhere Susan continues to care for Mathilda and plans to send her to Switzerland.
| 20 | 4 | "Your Father, My Friend" | Andy Wilson | Richard Warlow | 28 November 2014 (Amazon); 21 August 2015 (BBC One) | 3.71 |
Drake discovers a dishevelled Reid hiding in a Margate beach hut and informs him that nobody else saw him kill Buckley and that Mathilda is alive. They return to Whitechapel and eventually locate Mathilda at a brothel, where she had been taken by teen-aged pimp Harry Ward. Dr Frayn tells Reid she has reason to believe Mathilda saw his files on Jack the Ripper and the details of his first two murders, with the images of his victims scarring her and pushing her away from Reid. Suspicious of Capshaw's part in the train robbery, Fred Best shadows him and produces evidence to show that the stolen money belonged to Susan's father – which he gives to Jackson. Reid is reunited with his daughter. Jackson confronts Susan and they reconcile romantically. Jackson believes she is innocent and points Reid towards Capshaw. Before Reid can arrest the solicitor, Susan shoots him from behind the curtains and then kills Capshaw as he gloats over Reid's body, making it look as if they shot each other in self defense.
| 21 | 5 | "Heavy Boots" | Andy Wilson | Rob Green | 5 December 2014 (Amazon); 28 August 2015 (BBC One) | N/A |
Jackson attempts to drink away his sorrow and Drake sleeps once again with Rose as Reid lies comatose in Obsidian's hospital. But Fred Abberline rouses them to solve the murder of a publican whose body is found stuffed inside a barrel. Their investigation leads them to a gang of coopers from the local Black Eagle brewery, who have been using intimidation tactics to ensure that local publicans continue to serve the brewery's beers rather than beer from outside London. Meanwhile, Drake confronts Rose at the music hall, demanding that she tell her fiancé about their relationship. Suspicion finally falls on the younger of two brewery brothers who are apprentices at the brewery. Jackson convinces the elder brother, who is dying of consumption, to talk his sibling out of killing PC Grace, whom the brewery gang have kidnapped. Jackson sits in his surgery, contemplating all the horrors he has seen and faced as Mimi comforts him. In the hospital, Reid dreams of his past and of his daughter, and awakens. Long Susan greets him, asking "Sir, who am I?".
| 22 | 6 | "The Incontrovertible Truth" | Anthony Byrne | Richard Warlow | 12 December 2014 (Amazon); 4 September 2015 (BBC One) | N/A |
The recovering Reid arrests Lady Vera, Countess Montacute, an aristocrat who enjoys slumming it, who has been found unconscious in a Whitechapel lodging house next to the corpse of flower seller Ida Watts. Both women were drugged and Ida's cousin Tom Denton, a known thief who drugs his victims, is also brought in. He explains that he procured Ida for sex with Lady Vera and her husband, who arrives at the police station demanding his wife's release. Lady Vera admits to the murder but the modern finger-printing device proves that hers was not the hand upon the fatal weapon.
| 23 | 7 | "Live Free, Live True" | Saul Metzstein | Rachel Bennette | 19 December 2014 (Amazon); 11 September 2015 (BBC One) | 4.03 |
John Currie, a chemist, is murdered, with evidence that he was an abortionist who treated his clients with dangerous lead compounds. His apprentice points the police to a deserted surgery and a strong box, containing evidence that the doctor who owned the surgery was experimenting in sterilization. Dr Frayn persuades Susan to employ Dr Rolle, who will conduct medically supervised terminations to prevent girls visiting back street abortionists but it is too late for Mary Tait, mutilated by Currie and the cause of a fight between her boyfriend Edwin Havelock and her.
| 24 | 8 | "The Peace of Edmund Reid" | Saul Metzstein | Richard Warlow | 26 December 2014 (Amazon); 18 September 2015 (BBC One) | N/A |
American journalist Ralph Ackerman (Elliot Levey) is tortured and killed after meeting with Fred Best to discuss the tradings of Theodore P. Swift (Ian McElhinney), who has returned to London to dissolve Obsidian Estates to make way for his expanding business. Meanwhile, having matched the fingerprints found on the gun, Jackson confronts Susan about shooting Reid, which she confirms, along with the revelation she is pregnant. Best goes on the run for fear of his life at the hands of Swift's men. Reid meets with Susan, and offers to spare her instant arrest if she helps him bring down Swift. Jackson manages to find Best, and offers to keep him safe in the confines of his rooms, but Best ignores warning and goes in search of the truth. Meanwhile, Drake finally declares his feelings for Rose, which results in an expected proposal.

=== Series 4 (2016) ===
The fourth series is set in 1897.

| No. overall | No. in series | Title | Directed by | Written by | Original release date | UK viewers (millions) |
|---|---|---|---|---|---|---|
| 25 | 1 | "The Strangers' Home – Part 1" | Kieron Hawkes | Richard Warlow | 15 January 2016 (Amazon); 22 August 2016 (BBC Two) | 4.44 |
The opening of the new H division quarters by Assistant Commissioner Augustus Dove of Scotland Yard (Killian Scott) is interrupted by the murder of an Indian Muslim solicitor, who is found in Whitechapel docks with his throat slit. Meanwhile, Reid and Mathilda, happy in their new dwellings by the seaside, receive a surprise visit from Deborah Goren (Lucy Cohu), who begs Reid to return to Whitechapel to re-investigate a murder for which acclaimed scientist Isaac Bloom has been incarcerated, and whom she believes is innocent of the crime. Drake's investigation into the murdered solicitor is halted by the arrival of Special Branch Inspector Constantine (Derek Riddell), who claims that Drake's suspect for the murder is in fact the target of an undercover operation. Dr. Carlyle Probyn (Ed Hughes) has a proposition for Long Susan, that could see her escape her fate.
| 26 | 2 | "The Strangers' Home – Part 2" | Kieron Hawkes | Richard Warlow | 15 January 2016 (Amazon); 29 August 2016 (BBC Two) | 3.28 |
Drake is shocked by Rose's proposition that they take custody of Susan and Jackson's son Connor after she goes to the rope. Meanwhile, Reid's return to Whitechapel at the request of Deborah Goren is met with widespread disapproval. Inspector Constantine (Derek Riddell) takes custody of Drake's prisoner in the hope of extracting a confession, just as Jackson links a shipment of Turmeric to the murder victim, giving Drake and Major Al-Qadir a new line of enquiry. Augustus Dove pays Abel Croker (David Threlfall) a surprise visit to warn him of the police investigation, but when Croker uncovers the identity of the murderer, he decides to dish out his own brand of justice. Jackson is forced to take drastic measures to secure Dr. Probyn's help in securing Susan's escape from custody, and Drake is angered when he receives word of Reid's covert investigation.
| 27 | 3 | "Some Conscience Lost" | Luke Watson | Rachel Bennette | 22 January 2016 (Amazon); 5 September 2016 (BBC Two) | 3.21 |
Mathilda Reid discovers a young workhouse boy, Tommy Riggs, in an abandoned house. When the boy dies in her father's arms, he makes it his priority to find out who or what was responsible for the boy's death. He visits the workhouse, and speaks with the master, Cornelius Wild, who claims that the boy ran away some seven days ago, but was in full health when he disappeared. When a young woman, Lena Starling (Sonya Cassidy) comes into H division to identify the boy, Reid realises she is confused and that she is searching for answers as to the true fate of her own son. Drake, however, isn't impressed that Reid has side-lined an investigation he assigned to him, into four victims whose hands were sawn from their limbs for the crime of theft. Meanwhile, Rose also has problems of her own when she struggles to bond with her newly adopted son, Connor.
| 28 | 4 | "A White World Made Red" | Luke Watson | Justin Young | 29 January 2016 (Amazon); 12 September 2016 (BBC Two) | 3.21 |
The discovery of a body drained of its blood in a Whitechapel meat store leads Drake and Reid to suspect that a further victim lay dead elsewhere, both having been the subject of a gruesome blood transfusion experiment that appears to have gone badly wrong. During the post mortem of the first victim, Jackson discovers wounds which suggest the man was taken to the rope just 24 hours previously, and should therefore be held in the morgue at London City Hospital. Reid pays a visit to Frederick Treves (Paul Ready), who denies all knowledge of a body disappearing from his morgue. The victim's identity is discovered when a card in his possession reveals him to be an occupant of the Polish workhouse. There, Thatcher finds another victim, Magdalena (Julia Rosnowska), and uncovers a man's desperate plot to find a blood donor for his seriously ill daughter.
| 29 | 5 | "Men of Iron, Men of Smoke" | Luke Watson | Matt Delargy | 5 February 2016 (Amazon); 19 September 2016 (BBC Two) | 3.07 |
When a footballer of London League side Thames Ironworks F.C. is brutally murdered, a key suspect in the case is Thomas Gower, a child gang member Reid and Drake encountered eight years earlier following the murder of a toymaker. Drake believes he is a now a changed man, after serving in the army, and securing a job at the ironworks that only employs temperance men – but Reid does not believe a man can change. Further investigation by Jackson leads H division to discover that Gower was present at the scene of the murder, but was not the perpetrator. Gower, however, is unable to cope with the situation and resorts to desperate measures to secure his own sanity. Meanwhile, Susan sees a way she can escape her secret life with Jackson and her son, but Jackson is shocked to discover her plan to rob the one man who offered to help her.
| 30 | 6 | "No Wolves in Whitechapel" | Anthony Byrne | Richard Warlow | 12 February 2016 (Amazon); 26 September 2016 (BBC Two) | 3.07 |
Drake is distraught when Thomas Gower is found stabbed on the streets of Whitechapel, having been the victim of an attack by a perpetrator described as the 'Whitechapel Golem' by witnesses. Jackson's post-mortem, however, throws up some interesting questions when Gower is found to have sustained similar injuries to that of the victim of incarcerated murderer Isaac Bloom. Reid begins to question if Gower's murder is somehow linked to Bloom's case, but his findings only throw further shade on Drake's investigation. When a third victim is discovered by the local rabbi, Dove is forced to step in and gives Drake a grilling. Reid and Drake are forced to set their differences aside and work together to capture the now suspected serial killer operating in the city. Meanwhile, Rose is convinced that Susan escaped her fate and sets about trying to prove it.
| 31 | 7 | "Edmund Reid Did This" | Anthony Byrne | Richard Warlow | 19 February 2016 (Amazon); 3 October 2016 (BBC Two) | 2.97 |
Drake and Reid are convinced that Dove is somehow implicated in the case of the Whitechapel Golem, and with the help of Rachel Costello, uncover evidence that suggests that he was one of two young boys who were ambushed by wolves whilst travelling from their Jewish community to the streets of Whitechapel, in the care of the murdered Rabbi. Meanwhile, Thatcher and Drummond organise a sting to capture those responsible for the theft of three priceless porcelain vases, but are shocked when they find Jackson in possession of the stolen loot. Incarcerated, Jackson gives Reid information which leads him to the docker's yard, where he finds the Golem and Long Susan. His plans to bring down Dove are scuppered when Rose offers information which leads Dove to the body of Theodore Swift, and a message, which reads 'Edmund Reid Did This'. Reid, Drake, Jackson and Long Susan head to the tunnels to find Dove and Nathaniel but find Croker nearing death. The four separate to find the brothers, with Drake confronting Nathaniel. They viciously fight each other, which ends with Nathaniel biting Drake on the neck, mortally wounding him. Nathaniel flees as Reid, Jackson and Long Susan arrive to tend to Drake, but Drake dies.

=== Series 5 (2016) ===
The fifth and final series directly continues the events of series 4.

| No. overall | No. in series | Title | Directed by | Written by | Original release date | UK viewers (millions) |
|---|---|---|---|---|---|---|
| 32 | 1 | "Closed Casket" | Daniel Nettheim | Richard Warlow | 12 October 2016 (Amazon); 19 June 2017 (BBC Two) | 3.02 |
Reid, Jackson and Susan – on the run from the police – and in the care of Jackson's former flame Mimi Morton – must find a way to bring down Assistant Commissioner Dove, and reveal the truth about his long-lost brother, serial killer Nathaniel. Reid and Jackson discover that Nathaniel was responsible for an attack in which a fight dog was stolen from its owner, and set about finding out the location of the next dogfight. Before they arrive, Nathaniel sets all of the fight dogs free, causing a stampede through Whitechapel. Reid and Jackson pursue, but lose Nathaniel in the crowd. Meanwhile, H division are introduced to their new leader – the feared Inspector Jedediah Shine, former leader of K division. When Shine learns of Jackson and Reid's attendance at the dogfight, he sets up another in the hope of luring them out to secure their capture.
| 33 | 2 | "A Brittle Thread" | Daniel Nettheim | Richard Warlow | 12 October 2016 (Amazon); 26 June 2017 (BBC Two) | 2.41 |
Reid and Jackson are forced to run for cover when Shine and Thatcher arrive at the theatre, suspecting it to be their hiding place. Jackson is forced to control his trigger finger when Shine threatens to harm Mimi, but she manages to keep her cool. They decide to use the recently deceased body of a docksman as a ploy to smoke Nathaniel out of hiding. They recreate the injuries caused to his earlier victims using wolves' teeth, and leave the body in an alley just yards from Leman Street. Shine, however, is too clever by half and identifies the body as a hoax. When the morning paper portrays Reid as somewhat of a vigilante hero, Shine confronts editor Castello, but his interrogation proves too much for Thatcher – who, fed up with being under the reign of a bully and potential sexual predator, seeks out Reid, Jackson and Susan to offer them much needed help.
| 34 | 3 | "All the Glittering Blades" | Nick Rowland | Toby Finlay | 12 October 2016 (Amazon); 3 July 2017 (BBC Two) | 2.14 |
Nathaniel, exiled by his brother to a derelict cottage in the countryside outside Whitechapel, finds solace in a fish seller, Mr. Sumner, who visits daily to collect eels to sell on his fish stall. When Mr. Sumner suddenly dies from a long-suffered illness, Nathaniel offers to help his daughter, Prudence, and her young son, Robin. However, he finds that her brother, Caleb, is less than welcoming. When a thief tries to steal Prudence's takings from the stall, Nathaniel responds by breaking his fingers. Forced to flee, he is later forgiven by Prudence for his actions, but she is later warned of his violent tendencies by Augustus. Nathaniel manages to win back her trust, but in the process discovers she is being beaten by Caleb. When he confronts Caleb, the situation turns violent, and Nathaniel is forced to watch on as his animal tendencies rise to the surface once more.
| 35 | 4 | "The Dreaming Dead" | Nick Rowland | Toby Finlay | 12 October 2016 (Amazon); 10 July 2017 (BBC Two) | 2.31 |
Thatcher finds young Robin cowering in fear after the death of his mother and uncle at the hands of Nathaniel. He passes the boy into the care of Reid, Jackson and Susan, and they manage to uncover information which they believe could lead them to Nathaniel. When they arrive at the Sumners' house, they find it has been meticulously cleaned and the two bodies disposed of. Shine is not far behind, however, but is surprised to learn of the true identity of the killer. With Reid's information, he confronts Dove and discovers that the rumour of his brother's animal tendencies is true. Dove, however, persuades Shine that Reid is the bigger threat. Reid and Jackson find Robin's body in the river. Jackson decides to end his involvement in Reid's operation, and instead rescue his son from the claws of Dove. Reid, meanwhile, is the victim of a trap set by Shine.
| 36 | 5 | "A Last Good Act" | Ashley Way | Richard Warlow | 12 October 2016 (Amazon); 17 July 2017 (BBC Two) | 2.06 |
With Reid incarcerated, Jackson and Susan plan their escape with Connor. Susan, however, cannot bear to see Mathilda's relationship with her father laid in ruins, and in an attack of conscience, hatches a plan with Jackson to break Reid out of custody. Reid, however, has other ideas and refuses to go along with Jackson's plan. Having sent Thatcher to exhume the body of Robin Sumner in the hope of proving Dove's guilt, Reid lies in wait for the walls of H division to come crashing around him. Dove, however, is warned of Thatcher's plans and, at the boy's graveside, brings about Thatcher's demise and disposes of his body in the river. Nathaniel, however, witnesses the entire event and takes Robin's body to Susan. Meanwhile, Castello decides to contact an old friend of H division – Chief Inspector Abberline – to help her prove Dove's involvement in the murders.
| 37 | 6 | "Occurrence Reports" | Ashley Way | Richard Warlow | 12 October 2016 (Amazon); 24 July 2017 (BBC Two) | 2.16 |
Dove is brought to justice, as are his brother Nathaniel and Susan. To cover up the public scandal the Commissioner orders that Dove be imprisoned without trial under a false name. Instead of going to Susan's execution, Jackson leaves with Connor for the United States. Reid is reinstated as inspector. Mathilda marries and, being pregnant, leaves Whitechapel for a healthier setting to raise her child. Reid refuses to go with her and contents himself with reading her frequent letters and looking at the pictures she sends him. Mimi's Alexandria Theatre opens to the public and, on New Year's Eve 1899, Mimi leaves with a suitor after getting news of Jackson's death in the United States. Reid remains troubled by memories of Jack the Ripper and attempts to find closure for having failed to solve the case. This proves fruitless, and he continues to police Whitechapel as its sole guardian, spending the turn of the century alone in his office reading daily occurrence reports.
