= Ripper Street =

2012 British mystery drama television series

- Genre: Drama; Mystery
- Created by: Richard Warlow
- Starring: Matthew Macfadyen; Jerome Flynn; Adam Rothenberg; MyAnna Buring
- Theme music composer: Dominik Scherrer
- Composer: Dominik Scherrer
- Countries of origin: United Kingdom; United States
- Original language: English
- No. of series: 5
- No. of episodes: 37 (list of episodes)

Production
- Executive producers: Greg Brenman; Will Gould; Simon Vaughan; Andrew Lowe; Ed Guiney; Polly Hill
- Producers: Stephen Smallwood; Katie McAleese
- Production locations: Dublin, Ireland
- Cinematography: Julian Court; PJ Dillon; Peter Robertson
- Camera setup: Single-camera setup
- Running time: 58–76 minutes
- Production companies: Tiger Aspect Productions; Lookout Point

Original release
- Network: BBC One (series 1–3); BBC Two (series 4–5); Amazon Video (series 3–5)
- Release: 30 December 2012 – 12 October 2016

Ripper Street is a British mystery drama television series set in Whitechapel in the East End of London starring Matthew Macfadyen, Jerome Flynn, Adam Rothenberg, and MyAnna Buring. It begins in 1889, six months after the infamous Jack the Ripper murders. The first episode was broadcast on 30 December 2012, during BBC One's Christmas schedule, and was first broadcast in the United States on BBC America on 19 January 2013. Ripper Street returned for a second eight-part series on 28 October 2013.

On 4 December 2013, it was reported that a third series would not be made due to low viewing figures for the second series. Then on 11 December 2013, Variety reported negotiations between the show's producer Tiger Aspect and LoveFilm to fund future episodes, similar to Netflix's funding episodes of Arrested Development. On 26 February 2014, it was confirmed that Amazon Video would resurrect the show. Filming began in May 2014. The third series began streaming on Amazon UK Prime Instant Video on 14 November 2014 but was not immediately made available on Amazon's US site. The third series began airing on BBC America on 29 April 2015 and on BBC One on 31 July 2015.

In June 2015, the series was renewed for a fourth and fifth series. In 2016, it was announced that the show would end with the fifth series. The fourth series premiered on Amazon UK on 15 January 2016, on BBC America on 28 July 2016, and in the United Kingdom on BBC Two from 22 August 2016. The concluding fifth series' six episodes were released on Amazon UK on 12 October 2016.

== Plot ==
=== Series 1 ===
The series begins in April 1889, five months since the last Jack the Ripper killing, and in Whitechapel the H Division is responsible for policing one and a quarter square miles of East London: a district with a population of 67,000 poor and dispossessed. The men of H Division had hunted the Ripper and failed to find him. When more women are murdered on the streets of Whitechapel, the police begin to wonder if the killer has returned.

Among the factories, rookeries, chop shops (food establishments), brothels and pubs, Detective Inspector Edmund Reid (Matthew Macfadyen) and Detective Sergeant Bennet Drake (Jerome Flynn) team up with former US Army surgeon and Pinkerton agent Captain Homer Jackson (Adam Rothenberg) to investigate the killings. They frequently cross paths with Tenter Street brothel madam Long Susan (MyAnna Buring), who came to London with Jackson from America and lets him reside at the brothel. Their relationship becomes strained due to Jackson's attraction to one of her most profitable girls, Rose Erskine (Charlene McKenna), and because of his close involvement with Reid and H Division.

Reid and his wife Emily (Amanda Hale) only have one daughter, Mathilda, who was lost and presumed deceased, some months before the series begins, in a river accident (the SS Princess Alice disaster) during the hunt for the Ripper. The newspaper reporter, Fred Best (David Dawson), knows a dark secret about her death. Although still troubled, and despite her husband's reservations, Emily is determined to make a new life for herself by helping the fallen women of Whitechapel.

=== Series 2 ===
The second series is set in 1890. Emily has left Reid after he gave her false hope that Mathilda might not have drowned. Rose Erskine has left Long Susan's brothel to work as a waitress at the music hall, Blewett's Theatre of Varieties. Sergeant Drake has married another of Susan's girls, Bella. A new detective constable, Albert Flight (Damien Molony), is introduced.

Reid crosses swords with the ruthless Inspector Jedediah Shine (Joseph Mawle). Ten years an Inspector on the Hong Kong police force, Shine has used that experience to exert a firm grip over Limehouse's neighbouring "K" Division and the emergent Chinatown that grows within it. Long Susan, happy as brothel keeper, is in debt to Silas Duggan (Frank Harper), who lent her funds to start the business, unbeknownst to Jackson who wants to leave London.

Historical backdrops to episodes in the second series include Chinese immigration, the London matchgirls' strike of 1888, electrical war of the currents, the Cleveland Street scandal, the Hermetic Order of the Golden Dawn, Joseph Merrick (known as "the Elephant Man"), and the Baring crisis.

=== Series 3 ===
In 1894, a train accident in Whitechapel kills fifty-five civilians. At the scene of the accident, Reid, Drake, Jackson, Rose Erskine and Long Susan are reunited after a long period of separation. Reid investigates the derailment and discovers that it was caused by a heist. The organiser is Susan's solicitor, Ronald Capshaw. His intention is to steal US bearer bonds in order to bail out their financially stricken Obsidian Estates and to continue in their attempt to gentrify Whitechapel.

Mathilda is discovered by Capshaw to be still alive, although Reid is told by Susan that she has died since being rescued. Mathilda escapes and is picked up by Harry Ward, a teenage pimp. Receiving a tip-off where she was last seen, Reid and Drake find her, but she runs away. Reid returns to his home and father and daughter reunite.

=== Series 4 ===
Series 4 opens in 1897, the year of Queen Victoria's diamond jubilee. Reid has now given up his detective work and is living in Hampton-on-Sea with Mathilda. He is drawn back to Whitechapel after a visit from Deborah Goren, who urges him to return to investigate the murder of a rabbi at the hand of Isaac Bloom, whom she believes innocent.

Meanwhile, Drake is now head inspector of Whitechapel and still employs Jackson, who has given up his drinking and gambling in order to save money to free Susan, who is now sentenced to hang for her crimes. When his attempts to legally free her fail, he helps to fake her death, forcing her to give up their son to be raised by Drake and his wife Rose, while Susan hides out of sight and Jackson pretends to be a grieving widower to his friends.

=== Series 5 ===
Series 5 continues the events of series 4. Following Drake's murder and the exposure of their various crimes, Reid, Jackson and Susan hide out in Whitechapel with the aid of Mimi Morton. The trio covertly attempt to expose the true Whitechapel Golem, Nathaniel Dove, and bring his brother, assistant commissioner Augustus Dove, to justice. An unstable Jedediah Shine becomes the head of H Division and vows to capture Reid, while Mathilda now lives with Sergeant Drummond.

== Production ==
The show was a joint BBC and BBC America production written by Richard Warlow, Julie Rutterford, Declan Croghan and Toby Finlay, and directed by Andy Wilson (4 episodes), Colm McCarthy (2 episodes) and Tom Shankland (2 episodes). The series includes scenes of the seedier side of life during the late Victorian era, including bare-knuckle boxing, early pornography, and prostitution.

Tom Shankland said of the series, "Whitechapel's not an area that was short of vicious murders and any woman found murdered with a knife in the consequent months was held up as a Ripper murder... So we'll touch on Ripper in that way but not dig anybody up or change the canonical five... All the period depictions I'd seen of that particular crime story had almost been a bit too well behaved in a slightly slower way and shots have to be a bit wider to show off the nice furniture, but if you can think of something awful, it was happening [in Victorian London]."

=== Casting ===
The three leads of the show, Macfadyen, Flynn and Rothenberg, have discussed how they got the roles in interviews. Macfadyen claims his involvement was all down to his interest in the 'fresh' script: "I had a few months of nothing, then a load of scripts all came at once, and this was by far the best. It's such terrific writing; it just barrelled along. I saw the title and thought, 'This has been done before', but it was so fresh, and it had all the qualities, interest and depth of a period drama."

Rothenberg's involvement in the show was more straightforward, as he auditioned during pilot series. In an interview with both Flynn and Rothenberg, the latter states: "I auditioned for it, got it, and then showed up. That's as simple as it was for me," to which Flynn chimes in, claiming: "It was very funny, though, 'cause when he [Rothenberg] did show up, he was like, 'I don't know how the fuck I got here!'" Flynn's casting experience was similar: "It was pretty basic for me. The writer, Richard Warlow, had seen me in Game of Thrones, playing Bronn, and asked about casting me."

=== Filming ===
The series was filmed entirely in Dublin, Ireland, in locations that included the former Clancy Barracks beside Clancy Quay and Trinity College, Dublin.

The Leman Street police station and "The Brown Bear" pub are still on Leman Street. The Jews Orphan Asylum still exists, however it has been renamed and relocated, first to Norwood, and then to Stanmore.

== Cast ==
=== Main cast ===
L-R: MyAnna Buring, Adam Rothenberg, Matthew Macfadyen, Jerome Flynn, and Charlene McKenna

- Matthew Macfadyen as Detective Inspector Edmund Reid, the commander of East London's H Division. Reid is a workaholic driven by his failure to capture Jack the Ripper and the presumed death of Mathilda, his daughter. Deserted by his wife, Emily, Reid works most nights in his office at Leman Street.
- Jerome Flynn as Detective Sergeant, later Detective Inspector, Bennet Drake (series 1–4; guest series 5), Reid's right-hand man. After his marriage to reformed prostitute Bella and her subsequent demise, returning from Manchester, where he had transferred after her death, he is a changed man. He later marries Rose, another reformed prostitute.
- Adam Rothenberg as Captain Homer Jackson, a former US Army surgeon and Pinkerton agent. He is H Division's forensic expert. Jackson, who is married to Long Susan, a brothel madam, is really Matthew Judge, a fugitive from America. When his marriage to Susan breaks down, he reverts to being a drunken womaniser.
- MyAnna Buring as "Long" Susan Hart / Caitlin Swift Judge, Homer Jackson's wife and the daughter of a wealthy American industrialist. Susan owns a brothel in Tenter Street for much of the first and second series, though she later attempts to diversify and legitimize her businesses. Her attempts at legitimate business results in a train derailment and multiple deaths.
- Charlene McKenna as Rose Erskine (later Drake), a prostitute in Long Susan's house, who decides to turn her life around and becomes a music hall singer. Rose later serves as a police informant, and marries Bennet Drake after a long on-and-off romance.
- David Threlfall as Abel Croker (series 4), a crooked Thames wharfinger and Nathaniel Croker's protector
- David Warner as Rabbi Max Steiner (series 4)

=== Additional cast ===
==== Series 1 ====
- David Wilmot as Sergeant Donald Artherton (series 1–3), the long-standing desk sergeant of H Division who is forced to retire after contracting a serious case of gout
- David Dawson as Fred Best (series 1–3; guest series 5), editor of the local newspaper, who often irritates the men of H Division by imposing on ongoing investigations in the hope of obtaining a story
- Clive Russell as Detective Chief Inspector Frederick Abberline (series 1–3, 5), former commander of H Division and lead investigator in the Ripper murder case. Abberline and Reid have a somewhat on/off relationship, often differing in opinion on methods of investigation.
- Jonathan Barnwell as Police Constable Dick Hobbs, a junior constable assigned to H Division who is murdered in the line of duty by a serial offender whilst trying to protect a woman from being abducted
- Lucy Cohu as Deborah Goren (series 1 and 4), head of the Jewish orphanage, who becomes involved with Edmund Reid in the first series after she offers him hope of finding his missing daughter
- Amanda Hale as Emily Reid, Edmund Reid's wife. Their marriage is strained by the disappearance and presumed death of Mathilda, something which Emily blames her husband for, choosing to neglect her marriage in favour of charitable works. She is incarcerated in a mental institution between series 1 and 2, where she dies between series 2 and series 3.
- Gillian Saker as Bella Drake (series 1 and 2), a prostitute working for Long Susan, and later Bennet Drake's wife, who dies after being brainwashed by a cult which she was involved in several years previously, which saw her bear a child to the cult leader
- Ian McElhinney as Theodore P. Swift (series 1 and 3), Long Susan's father, who is the owner proprietor of a U.S. bank that falls into heavy debt, resulting in his need to flee the country and protect all of his remaining wealth in unregistered bearer bonds

==== Series 2 ====
- Damien Molony as Detective Constable Albert Flight, a junior constable just out of uniform who is assigned to H Division by Chief Inspector Abberline
- Joseph Mawle as Detective Inspector Jedediah Shine (series 2 and 5), the feared inspector of K Division whom Reid tries to unveil as the man responsible for a string of untimely murders. Shine later returns in the fifth series to take up the position of Inspector of H division.
- Leanne Best as Jane Cobden (series 2 and 3), a local councillor who first comes to prominence as the opposing candidate for Walter De Souza, who is abducted in the line of duty for his part in the match girls' strike of 1888
- Alicia Gerrard as Charity (series 2 and 3), a prostitute working for Long Susan, who later goes on to become receptionist at the clinic following the closure of the brothel
- Frank Harper as Silas Duggan, property owner and barber who owns the building in which Long Susan operates her brothel

==== Series 3 ====
- John Heffernan as Ronald Capshaw, Long Susan's solicitor, who persuades her to rob one of her father's cargo trains
- Louise Brealey as Dr Amelia Frayn, senior physician at the clinic opened by Long Susan following the closure of her brothel. Frayn also cares for Mathilda Reid in the early days after her release from captivity.
- Lydia Wilson as Hermione "Mimi" Morton (series 3 and 5), Homer Jackson's girlfriend. Mimi is sister to Edgar Morton, Rose Erskine's fiancé and employer.
- Josh O'Connor as Police Constable Bobby Grace, junior constable in H Division
- Anna Burnett as Mathilda Reid (series 3–5), Reid's long lost daughter with whom he is reunited after she is discovered to have been held captive since her disappearance some six years previously in the SS Princess Alice disaster on the Thames

==== Series 4 and 5 ====
- Killian Scott as Assistant Commissioner Augustus Dove, a senior officer at Scotland Yard. Dove is known to have participated in corrupt activity, predominately associated with his long-lost brother, Nathaniel.
- Matthew Lewis as Sergeant/Inspector Samuel "Drum" Drummond, desk sergeant of H division who replaces the outgoing Sergeant Atherton
- Benjamin O'Mahony as Detective Sergeant / Sergeant Frank Thatcher, Drake's right-hand-man
- Anna Koval as Rachel Castello, a local reporter who takes over as editor of the Star newspaper
- Jonas Armstrong as Nathaniel Croker, also known as Nathaniel Dove, Abel Croker's assistant and Augustus Dove's brother
- Kahl and Kye Murphy as Connor Judge, Homer Jackson and Long Susan's son, who is born during her years of incarceration

== Episodes ==
Series	Episodes	Originally released	
Series	Episodes	First released	Last released
1	8	30 December 2012	24 February 2013
2	8	28 October 2013	16 December 2013
3	8	14 November 2014	26 December 2014
4	7	15 January 2016	19 February 2016
5	6	12 October 2016	12 October 2016

== Reception ==
Ripper Street was well received by critics upon release. On the review aggregator website Metacritic, the series has a weighted average score of 72 out of 100, based on 18 critics, indicating "generally favorable reviews". On another review aggregator website, Rotten Tomatoes, the first season holds an approval rating of 90%, based on 20 reviews, with an average rating of 7.39/10. The site's critics consensus reads: "Gritty, sinister, and visually striking, Ripper Street is a gripping thriller, with well-crafted characters and compellingly lurid plotlines." The second, third, and fifth seasons hold approval ratings of 86%, 100%, and 100% respectively.

Critical reception of the initial two episodes was divided, with some praising the show's gritty script and good acting performances, and others feeling the show was a mix of ITV's Whitechapel and Guy Ritchie's Sherlock Holmes.

In his weekly review of the show, Jamie-Lee Nardone wrote of its continued improvements, "more of this please, just perhaps not before dinner", referencing the show's gory nature.

Sam Wollaston of The Guardian discussed the pros and cons of the show, claiming "It would be easy to be negative about Ripper Street. Do we really need more on a story that's been not just done to death, but then carved up, and had its insides torn out?" but he concludes his review stating "[the] script is real, alive and human. It's beautifully performed, and beautiful to look at – stylish, and stylised. The bare-knuckle fight scenes are brutal and memorable. It's proper, character-based crime drama, gripping, and yes – I'm afraid – ripping as well".

Benji Wilson of The Daily Telegraph reviewed the first episode positively, praising the performances of the three leads, which he said compensated for the "dull grind of all the exposition" and "tedious" historical references.

PopMatters reviewed the debut episode, remarking:

The effects of such moments are shaped by writer/creator Richard Warlow and episode director Tom Shankland's attention to the period details: streets are sooty, gaslight creates flickering shadows, and stone floors make footsteps seem chilling. These details help make Ripper Street a compelling procedural, its long form narrative and deliberate pace different from the CSI and Law & Order clones. But the show also bears traces of contemporary influences: an underground boxing club sequence in the first episode resembles similar scenes in Sherlock Holmes (2009) so much that a coincidence is hard to imagine. Equally derivative, some overt efforts to shock viewers deliver graphic violence and some nudity, courtesy of the evolving technology of photography, as it's inspiring an evolving "smut" industry.

Ahead of its debut in the US, IGN's Roth Cornet reviewed the first episode, discussing how "the setting is handled with absolute care and a razor-sharp attention to detail, from costume and production design to the varied vocal cadences of the players, the texture and flavor of London's East End are brought to vivid life." The review continues to discuss the show's depiction of London's streets in the Victorian era:

Ripper Street provides a gritty look at the evolving streets of London and the advent of technology at the time; be it the "moving-picture-machine" that is featured in "I Need Light" or the introduction of early forensics that follows through the series. More interesting still is that it is the dirt and bones look at the uses of said technology that is in play here. This is no wink-wink "look at how charming early cameras were" depiction, but rather a portrayal of the underbelly of what those cameras would have been used for. Additionally, there is engaging interplay between those who would usher in necessary change and those who are, as Jackson says, "the barriers to progress."

The Hollywood Reporter gave it significant praise: "Ripper Street is a well-acted, well-written and compelling mystery series. And even better, there's no waiting around, wishing it would improve. It's alluring from the start." Los Angeles Times called it "Well-written and acted."

Grace Dent of The Independent was satirical about the show and was unamused by the portrayal of women, stating "centuries may shift and fashions may change, yet raping and murdering women has really never been as popular."

The show was later voted best show of 2013 in a UK public poll for the Radio Times TV guide and magazine shortly after the series had ended, ahead of Doctor Who.

== Home media ==
Series 1 was released on a region 2 (Europe) 3-disc DVD set and 3-disc BD on 18 March 2013, with the same DVDs being released in region 1 (Canada/US) on 12 March 2013.

The series 2 DVD-set, plus a 6-disc box set containing both series 1 & 2, was scheduled to be released on 27 January 2014, with region 1 DVDs of series 2 to be released on 15 April 2014.

== See also ==
- Sergeant Cork (1963–1968), a British detective television series (66 episodes) and police procedural which followed the efforts of two police officers and their battle against crime in Victorian London.
- Cribb (1979–1981), a British television detective series (14 episodes) police drama of a sergeant in the newly formed CID in Victorian London.
- Copper (2012–2013), a BBC America crime series set in 1860s New York City during the American Civil War.
- Murdoch Mysteries (2008–present), a Canadian detective series set in Victorian Toronto.
