= Matchgirls' strike =

1888 labour dispute in the UK

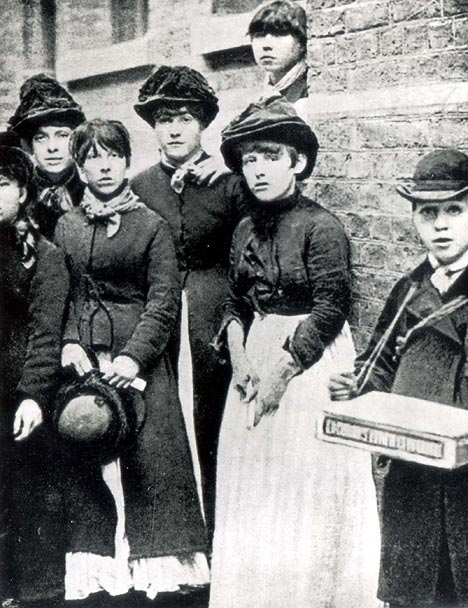
Matchgirl strikers, several showing early signs of phossy jaw

In July 1888 the women and teenage girls working at the Bryant & May match factory in Bow, London, England went on strike. At first, the strikers were protesting the dismissal of a worker after employees had refused a demand from Bryant & May management to repudiate an article on terrible working conditions at the factory. When management promised to rehire the fired worker, the strikers continued the industrial action to bargain for a cessation of unfair deductions from pay and for other improvements to working conditions. With the help of social activist Annie Besant, they succeeded.

Following the strike's success, the Union of Women Matchmakers (later the Matchmakers' Union) was formed later in 1888. From its creation, it was the largest union of women and girls in the country, and inspired a wave of collective organising among industrial workers.

== Background ==
=== Match making ===
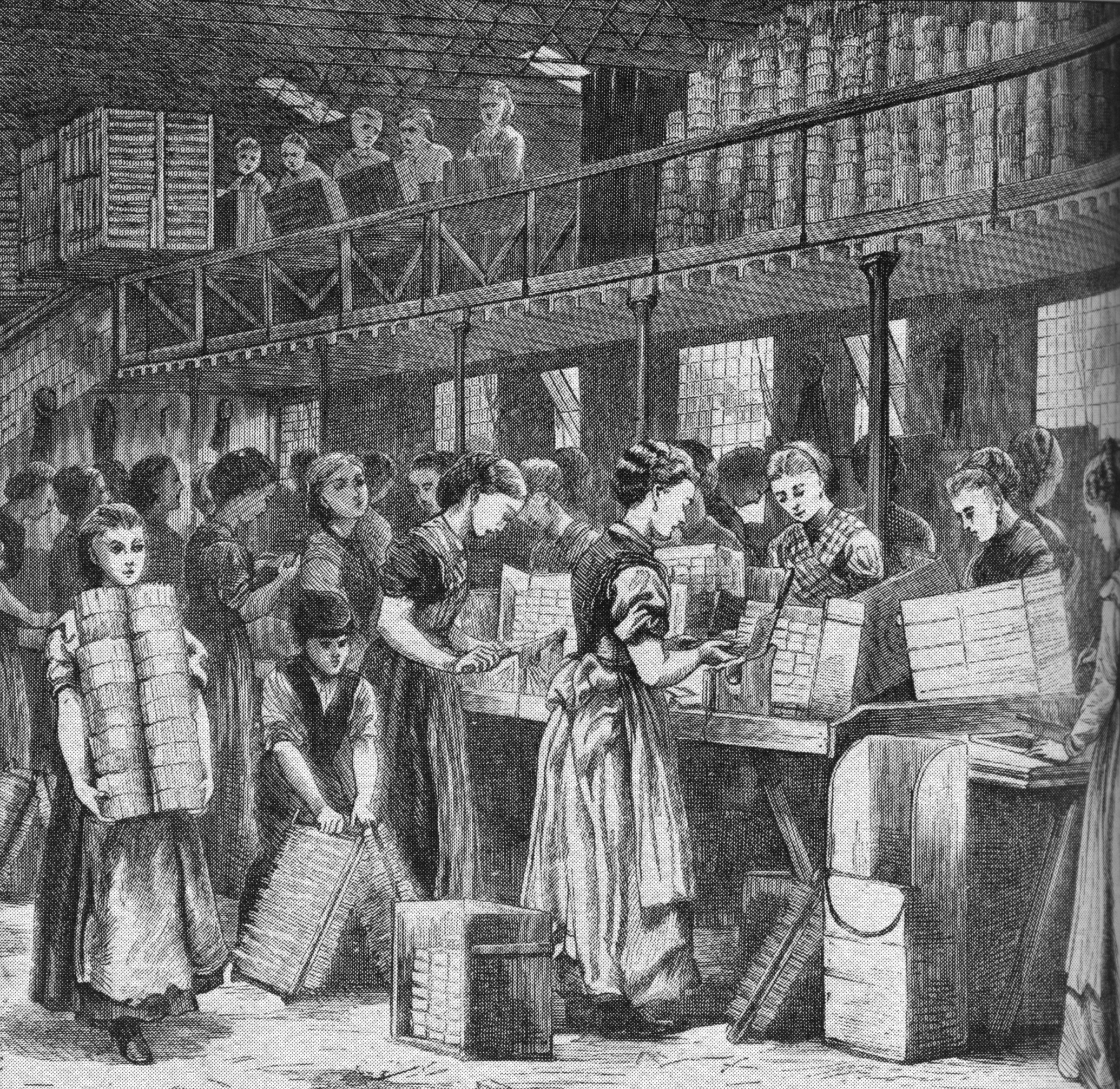
Women working in a match factory, possibly that of Bryant & May

In the late nineteenth century matches were made using sticks of poplar or Canadian pine wood, twice the length of the finished product. These were secured into frames holding approximately 4,000. Both ends of the sticks were dipped into sulphur and then into a composition of white phosphorus (also known as yellow phosphorus), potassium chlorate, antimony sulphide, powdered glass and colouring. The level of white phosphorus in the match varied; in 1899 a government report stated that in the UK it was between six and seven per cent, while a Royal Economic Society report of 1902 put the figure at "usually about five; sometimes as much as ten per cent". Experienced workers could finish 1,400 frames in a ten-hour shift, which created ten million matches. Once the double-ended matches had been dried in ovens, they were placed in a machine to halve them into single matches. They were packed into boxes of a hundred and these then tied into bundles of twelve. Those involved in dipping the matches were usually male; women dominated the workforce involved in the remainder of the process.

The inclusion of sulphur—nicknamed brimstone—was one of the reasons early matches were called lucifers; although they were also called congreves. (Note: The matches were named congreves after Sir William Congreve, the inventor of Congreve rockets.) Lucifer matches could be ignited on any surface where friction could be created with the strike. In the 1840s red phosphorus was discovered, which was more stable when exposed to the air. This meant matches could be made without any phosphorus, with a striking surface on the box that contained red phosphorus.

In 1897 there were 4,152 people working in 25 match-making factories in Britain, 2,658 of whom were adults, 1,492 were aged between 14 and 18, and 2 under the age of 14. Of the factories that produced matches, 23 of them used white phosphorus. They employed 3,134 people; 245 men and 1,276 women were involved in processes that included phosphorus, with the remainder employed in non-phosphorus roles.

An occupational disease that affected those who worked with white phosphorus was phosphorus necrosis of the jaw, also known as phossy jaw; the condition is not associated with red phosphorus. Phossy jaw developed by inhalation of phosphorus vapour—particularly when the ingredient was heated—which caused osteonecrosis of the jaw bone. This manifested itself in, initially, toothaches and flu-like symptoms, then tooth loss, abscesses, swelling of the gums, the formation of fistula and necrosis of the jaw. Mortality was reported in around 20 per cent of cases.

=== Bryant & May ===
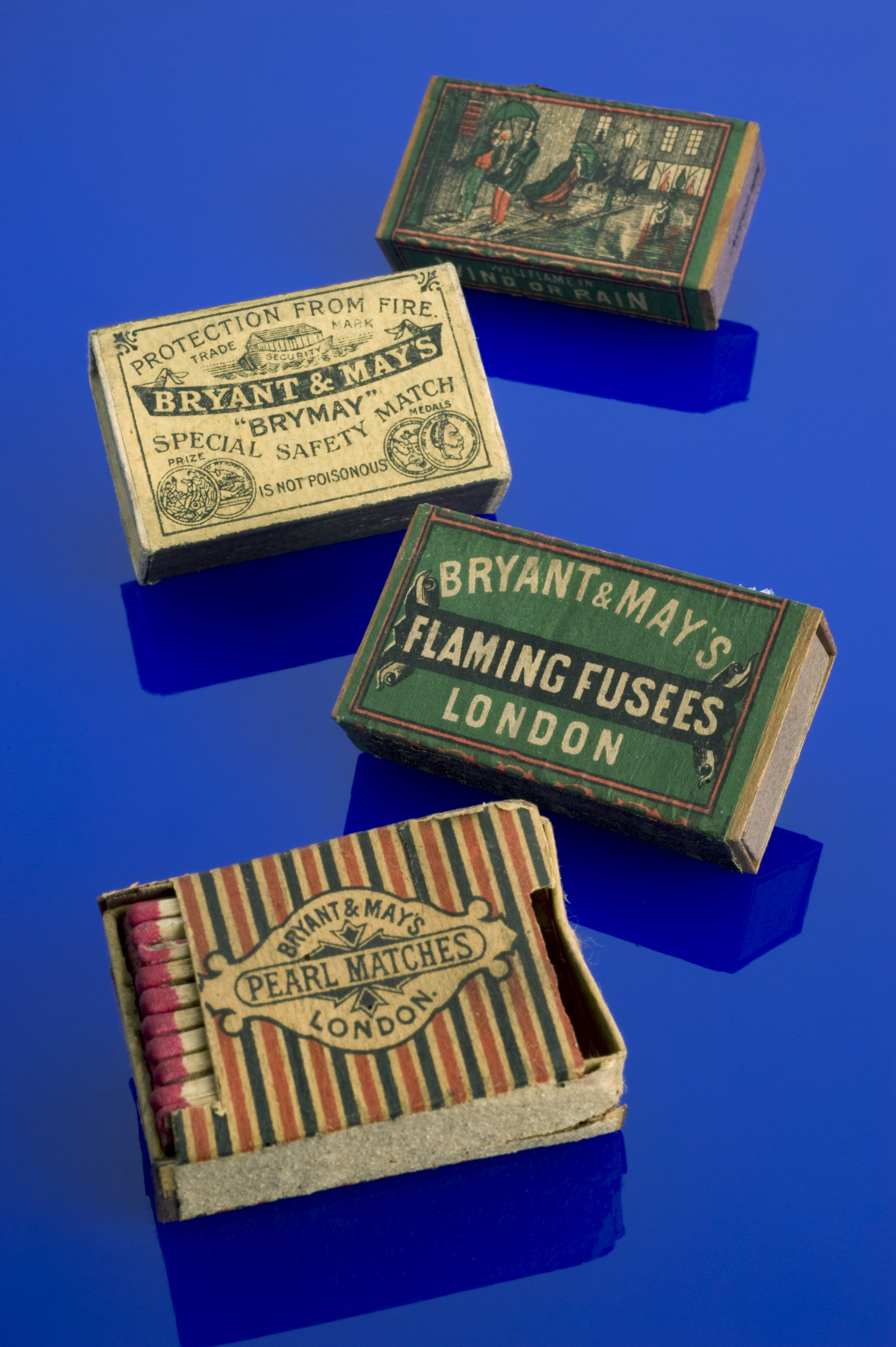
Bryant & May 'Pearl' safety matches, 1890–1891

The match-making company Bryant & May was formed in 1843 by two Quakers, William Bryant and Francis May, to trade in general merchandise. In 1850 the company entered into a relationship with the Swedish matchmaker Johan Edvard Lundström in order to capture part of the market of the 250 million matches used in Britain each day. In 1850 the company sold 231,000 boxes of matches; by 1855 this had risen to 10.8 million boxes and to 27.9 million boxes in 1860. In 1880 the company began exporting their goods; in 1884 they became a publicly-listed company. Dividends of 22.5 per cent in 1885 and 20 per cent in 1886 and 1887 were paid. In 1861 Bryant relocated the business to a three-acre site, on Fairfield Road, Bow, east London.

In the 1880s Bryant & May employed nearly 5,000 people, most of them female and Irish or of Irish descent, although the numbers varied with the seasonal fluctuations of the market; by 1895 the figure was 2,000 people, of which between 1,200 and 1,500 were women and girls.

The matchboxes were made through domestic outwork under a sweating system. (Note: The Fifth Report from the Select Committee of the House of Lords on the Sweating System defined "sweating" as "the evils known by that name are ...: 1. A rate of wages inadequate to the necessities of the workers or disproportionate to the work done.; 2. Excessive hours of labour.; 3. The insanitary state of the houses in which the work is carried out.") Such a system was preferred because the workers were not covered under the Factory Acts. Such workers received 2 1/4 to 2 1/2 penny (d) per gross of boxes. The workers had to provide glue and string from their own funds.

The workers were paid different rates for completing a ten-hour day, depending on the type of work undertaken. The frame-fillers were paid 1 shilling (s) per 100 frames completed; the cutters received 2 3/4 d for three gross of boxes, and the packers got 1s 9d per 100 boxes wrapped up. Those under 14 years-of-age received a weekly wage of about 4 s. Most workers were lucky if they took the full amounts home, as a series of fines were levied by the foremen, with the money deducted directly from wages. The fines included 3 d for having dirty feet—many of the workers were bare-footed as shoes were too expensive—or having an untidy workbench or talking; 5 d was deducted for being late; and a shilling for having a burnt match on the workbench. The women and girls involved in boxing up the matches had to pay the boys who brought them the frames from the drying ovens and had to supply their own glue and brushes. One girl who dropped a tray of matches was fined 6 d.

Bryant & May were aware of phossy jaw. If a worker complained of having toothache, they were told to have the teeth removed immediately or be sacked.

==== Political activism ====
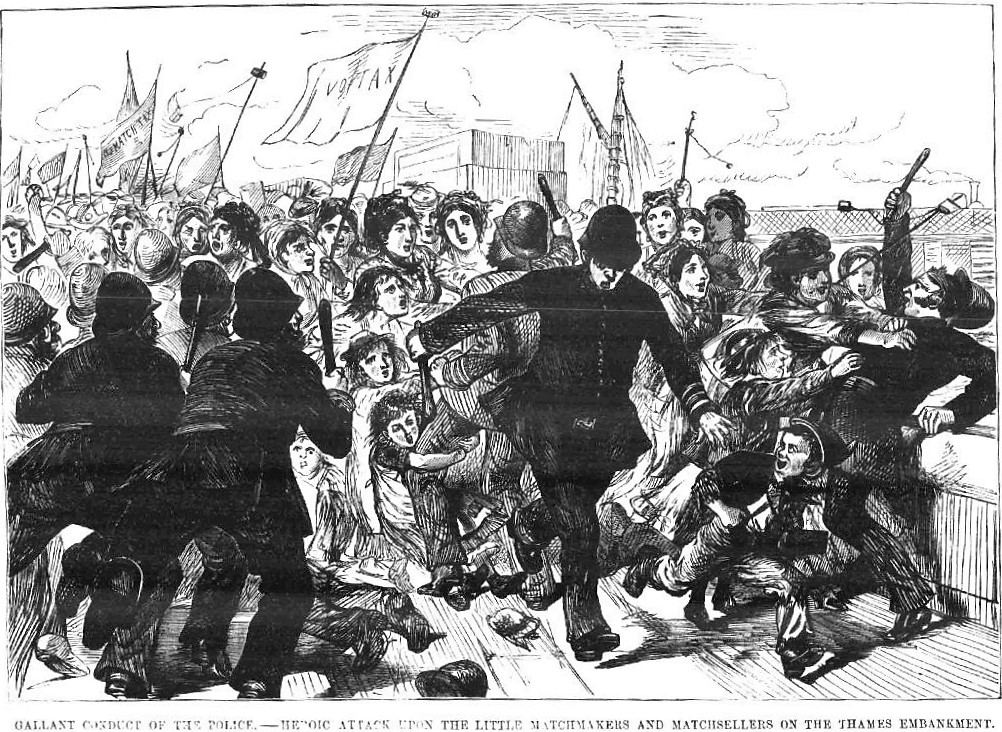
Cartoon from The Day's Doings, showing the police clashing with the matchmakers' march

The matchmakers had been involved in organised political action in the 1870s and 1880s. An attempt to introduce a tax on matches in April 1871 was strongly opposed by the match makers and was criticised in the national press. (Note: The Times, in a leader on the proposal, opined that the tax was "a singularly reactionary proposal" that would affect the poor more heavily.) The day after a mass-meeting at Victoria Park, London, up to 10,000 match makers—mostly girls and women between the ages of thirteen and twenty—marched to the Houses of Parliament to present a petition. They were harassed by police on the way, who unsuccessfully tried to block their way. The Manchester Guardian described that "policemen, strong in their sense of officialism, and bullying in their strength, approached the verge of brutality". Queen Victoria wrote to the prime minister, William Gladstone, to protest about the tax and the day following the march, the proposed tax was withdrawn.

The matchmakers went on strike in 1881, 1885 and 1886 over low wages and the punitive fine structure. The actions were all unsuccessful. The historian Lowell Satre considers that the match makers were more concerned over pay and the fines than they were about safety.

== Strike ==
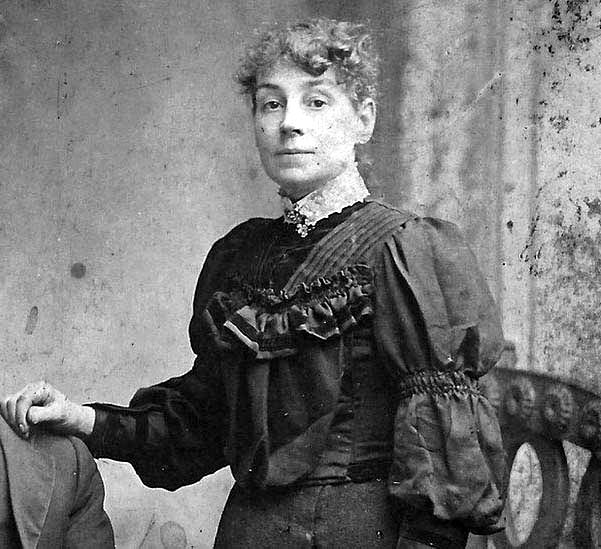
Sarah Chapman led the strike

The working conditions in the match factory had caused great discontent: up to fourteen-hour workdays, poor pay (made far worse in 1888 by a poor harvest which caused hours to be drastically reduced), unjust fines, having no clean area to eat, and the severe health complications of working with allotropes of white phosphorus, which caused phosphorus necrosis also known as phosphorimus chronicus or phossy jaw.

Social activist Annie Besant and her friend Herbert Burrows became involved in the situation and published an article in her halfpenny weekly paper The Link on 23 June 1888. This article angered Bryant & May management, who then tried to get their workforce to sign a paper contradicting it, but the workers refused to do so. This caused management to dismiss a worker (on some other pretext), on or about 2 July 1888, which set off the strike.

Approximately 1,400 women and girls refused to work by the end of the first day after the dismissal. Management quickly offered to reinstate the sacked employee but the women then demanded other concessions, particularly in relation to the unfair fines which were deducted from their wages. A deputation of women (Sarah Chapman, Mary Cummings, and Mrs Naulls) went to management but was not satisfied by their response. By 6 July the whole factory had stopped work. That same day about 100 of the women went to see Besant and to ask for her assistance (It has often been said that she started or led the strike but she knew nothing of it until the deputation called to see her). She was at first concerned by the precipitate action they had taken and by the number of women who were now out of work with no means of support.

Meetings were held by the strikers and Besant spoke at some of the meetings. Charles Bradlaugh, Member of Parliament (MP) spoke in parliament and a deputation of match women went there to meet three MPs on 11 July. The London Trades Council became involved, and there was significant publicity. At first, management was firm, but the factory owner, Bryant, was a leading Liberal and nervous about the publicity.

Besant helped at meetings with management and terms were formulated at a 16 July meeting, in which fines, deductions for the cost of materials and other unfair deductions would be abolished. Also, grievances could be taken straight to management without having to involve the foremen, who had prevented management from knowing of previous complaints. An important additional term was that meals were to be taken in a separate room, where the food would not be contaminated with phosphorus. These terms were accepted and the strike ended.

== Consequences ==
Following the strike's success, the Union of Women Matchmakers (later the Matchmakers' Union) was formed later in 1888. On its creation, it was the largest union of women and girls in the country, and inspired a wave of collective organising among industrial workers.

In 1891 the Salvation Army opened up its own match factory in the Bow district of London, using less toxic red phosphorus and paying better wages. Part of the reason behind this match factory was the desire to improve the conditions of home workers, including children, who dipped white phosphorus-based matches at home. Several children had died from eating these matches.

The Bryant & May factory received bad publicity from these events, and in 1901 they announced that their factory no longer used white phosphorus. The owners, Francis May and William Bryant, had started importing red-phosphorus based safety matches from John Edvard Lundström, in Sweden, in 1850. However, Bryant & May's safety matches sales had increased 10-fold by 1855 and Lundström was unable to increase his production any further, so they bought his British patent, and with his assistance, built a model safety match factory in Bow. They started using red phosphorus in 1855, but could not compete in price against the much cheaper white phosphorus-based matches; hence the use of child labour.

The Salvation Army had the same problem; their own matches were initially three times the price of white phosphorus-based matches. They had some partial success because: many of their supporters refused to buy white phosphorus-based matches; they automated much of the match-making processes (but not box filling), thus bringing down costs; and the use of child labour in dangerous trades had been prohibited. But the factory still struggled to compete on price, and after 1898 the Salvation Army War Cry newspaper ceased to advertise their matches. Their last make-or-break advertisement was run on 24 February 1900, and the match factory finally closed and was taken over by Bryant & May on 26 November 1901.

In 1908 the House of Commons passed the White Phosphorus Matches Prohibition Act 1908 (8 Edw. 7. c. 42) prohibiting the use of white phosphorus in matches after 31 December 1910. This was the United Kingdom's implementation of the 1906 Berne Convention on the prohibition of white phosphorus in matches.

== In popular culture ==
In 1966 the British actor Bill Owen collaborated with songwriter Tony Russell to create a musical about the strike, named The Matchgirls. The strike was next featured in an episode in the second series of the BBC's Ripper Street, originally aired on 11 November 2013, with various victims of the conditions in the factories seeking revenge on the parties involved.

An event to commemorate the 125th anniversary was held in Bishopsgate, London in 2013. The matchgirls were featured during the "HerStory" video tribute to notable women on U2's tour in 2017 for the 30th anniversary of The Joshua Tree during a performance of "Ultraviolet (Light My Way)" from the band's 1991 album Achtung Baby.

The children's novel Florence and the Mischievous Kitten by Megan Rix, published by Puffin Books in 2019, tells the story of the Bryant & May matchgirl Beth protesting in the summer of 1888 and her meeting with Florence Nightingale.

In 2022 a fictionalized account of the origins of the strike was depicted in the Netflix film Enola Holmes 2. Strike leader Sarah Chapman was played by Hannah Dodd.

== Commemoration ==
In 2022 English Heritage announced that the Matchgirls' Strike would be commemorated with a blue plaque at the site of the former Bryant & May factory in Bow, London, later that year. The plaque was unveiled at Bow Quarter, Fairfield Road, Tower Hamlets on 5 July 2022 by actress Anita Dobson and Sam Johnson, great-granddaughter of strike committee leader Sarah Chapman.

== See also ==
- Albright and Wilson
- Youth activism

== Notes and references ==
=== Sources ===
==== Books ====
- Beaver, Patrick (1985). The Match Makers: The Story of Bryant & May. London: Henry Melland. ISBN 978-0-907929-11-6.
- Beer, Reg (1983). The Match Girls Strike, 1888. London: The Labour Museum. OCLC 16612310.
- Briggs, Asa (1989). Victorian Things. Chicago, IL: University of Chicago Press. ISBN 978-0-226-07483-2.
- Emsley, John (2000). The Shocking History of Phosphorus: A Biography of the Devil's Element. London: Macmillan. ISBN 978-0-333-76638-5.
- Fishman, William J. (1988). East End 1888: Life in a London Borough Among the Labouring Poor. Philadelphia, PA: Temple University Press. ISBN 978-0-8772-2572-0.
- Harvey, Charles; Turner, John (1989). Labour and Business in Modern Britain. London: Frank Cass. ISBN 978-0-7146-3365-7.
- Koven, Seth (2015). The Match Girl and the Heiress. Princeton, NJ: Princeton University Press. ISBN 978-1-4008-6542-0.
- McAllister, Pam (1988). You Can't Kill the Spirit. Philadelphia, PA: New Society Publishers. ISBN 978-0-86571-130-3.
- Raw, Louise (2011). Striking a Light: The Bryant and May Matchwomen and their Place in History. London: Continuum International. ISBN 978-1-4411-1426-6.
- Threlfall, Richard (1952). The Story of 100 Years of Phosphorus Making: 1851 - 1951. Albright & Wilson.

==== Official reports ====
- Fifth Report from the Select Committee of the House of Lords on the Sweating System (Report). London: Her Majesty's Stationery Office. 1890. OCLC 976630092.
- Thorpe, Thomas; Oliver, Thomas; Cunningham, George (1899). Reports to the Secretary of State for the Home Department on the Use of Phosphorus in the Manufacture of Lucifer Matches. London: Her Majesty’s Stationery Office. OCLC 474543419.

==== Journals ====
- Hughes, J. P. W.; Baron, R.; Buckland, D. H.; Cooke, M. A.; Craig, J. D.; Duffield, D. P.; Grosart, A. W.; Parkes, P. W. J.; Porter, A.; Frazer, A. C.; Hallam, J. W.; Snawdon, J. W. E.; Tavenner, R. W. H. (April 1962). "Phosphorus Necrosis of the Jaw: A Present-Day Study: With Clinical and Biochemical Studies". British Journal of Industrial Medicine. 19 (2): 83–99. doi:10.1136/oem.19.2.83. JSTOR 27721724. PMC 1038164. PMID 14449812.
- Jacobsen, C.; Zemann, W.; Obwegeser, J. A.; Grätz, K. W.; Metzler, P. (28 December 2012). "The Phosphorous Necrosis of the Jaws and what can we Learn from the Past: A Comparison of 'Phossy' and 'Bisphossy' Jaw" (PDF). Oral and Maxillofacial Surgery. 18 (1): 31–37. doi:10.1007/s10006-012-0376-z. PMID 23271457. S2CID 22798482.
- Lehmann, Elise (April 2017). "Match-Making in Britain from 1827 to 1910: The Dangers of White Phosphorus in Lucifer Match Production". University of Saskatchewan Undergraduate Research Journal. 3 (2). doi:10.32396/usurj.v3i2.
- Marx, Robert E. (November 2008). "Uncovering the Cause of 'Phossy Jaw' Circa 1858 to 1906: Oral and Maxillofacial Surgery Closed Case Files—Case Closed". Journal of Oral and Maxillofacial Surgery. 66 (11): 2356–2363. doi:10.1016/j.joms.2007.11.006. PMID 18940506.
- Satre, Lowell J. (September 1982). "After the Match Girls' Strike: Bryant and May in the 1890s". Victorian Studies. 6 (1): 7–31. JSTOR 3827491.
- Wood, George H. (December 1902). "Report on the Manufacture of Matches". The Economic Journal. 12 (48): 556–560. doi:10.2307/2957325. JSTOR 2957325.

==== News articles ====
- "Leader". The Times. 21 April 1871. p. 9.
- "The Matchmakers' Demonstration". The Guardian. 26 April 1871. p. 6.

==== Internet and audio visual media ====
- Arnold, A. J. (2004). "'Ex luce lucellum'? Innovation, class interests and economic returns in the nineteenth century match trade" (PDF). University of Exeter. ISSN 1473-2904. Archived from the original (PDF) on 23 October 2022.
- Clark, Gregory (2019). "The Annual RPI and Average Earnings for Britain, 1209 to Present (New Series)". MeasuringWorth.
- "The Match Workers Strike Fund Register". Trades Union Congress.
- "Matchgirls Strike". Spartacus Educational.
