= Matchmakers' Union =

British trade union

The Matchmakers' Union
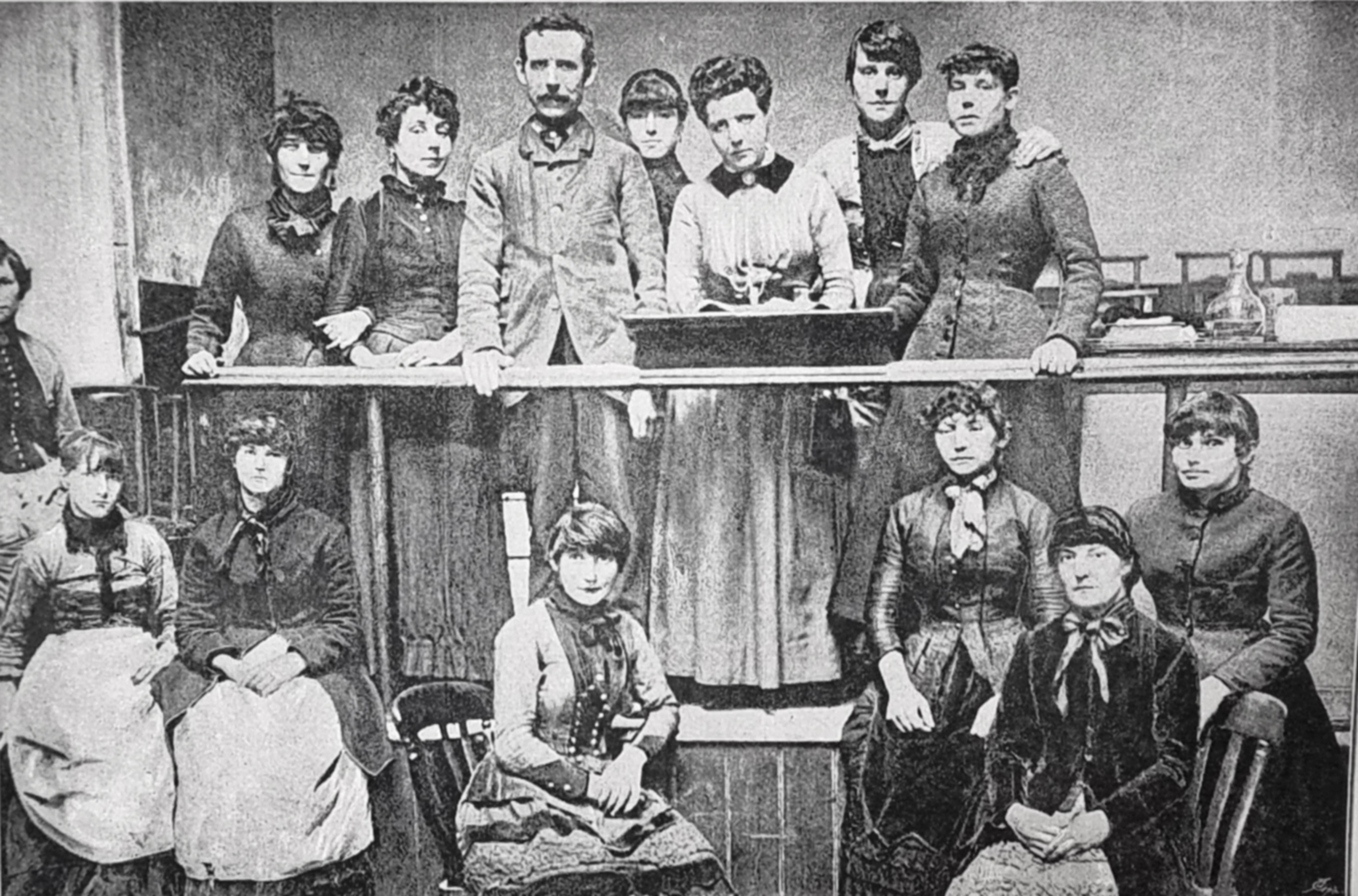
- Matchgirls' Strike Committee, showing Sarah Chapman, elected President of the Union, Annie Besant, and Herbert Burrows, 1888
- Formation: 27 July 1888
- Dissolved: 1903
- Location: London, England
- Origins: The Matchgirls' Strike
- Formerly called: The Union of Women Matchmakers

The Matchmakers' Union (founded as The Union of Women Matchmakers) was a British trade union formed in 1888 following the successful Matchgirls' strike. On its creation, it was the largest union of women and girls in the country, and inspired a wave of collective organising among industrial workers.

== Formation ==
The Union of Women Match Makers was formed following successful industrial action by workers at the Bryant & May factory, who challenged poor and unsafe working conditions, and low pay.

Matchmakers Union members, London, c. 1888

The inaugural meeting of the Union of Women Match Makers was held on 27 July 1888 at Stepney Meeting Hall, Stepney Green. The meeting was chaired by Ben Cooper, Secretary of the Cigarmakers' Trade Union. W. C. Steadman of the London Trades Council moved that:

This meeting is of the opinion that it is desirable that a trade union should be formed of all women matchmakers employed in, factories, and those present pledge themselves to do all in their power to make such union a success.

Clementina Black of the Women's Trade Union League seconded the resolution. The Pall Mall Gazette reported Black as saying:

Many ills occurred from women not taking part in public life. The world was as good as we made it, and no better. Unionists stood together to help all; not for each singly, but for the common good. But they must be persistent; not merely angry fora moment, but steadily holding together for one and all.

Twelve women were elected to the committee, with Annie Besant as Secretary, Herbert Burrows as Treasurer, and strike organiser Sarah Chapman, elected president. Burrows also proposed the election of five East End members of the London Trades’ Council to act as a consultative committee, to whom the girls might turn for advice in difficulties. This too was passed.

Subsequently, with money remaining from the strike fund and a benefit event, permanent premises were acquired. By October of that year, over 650 members had joined the Union, which became the Matchmakers' Union - now open to both men and women. In November, the Union sent two delegates to the International Trade Union Congress.

The Union helped their fellow workers at the Bell Match factory in their own strike action, and in 1888 sent 10s to support women weavers at Leeds, who had resolved to form a union.

In 1896, at the International Socialist Workers and Trade Union Congress in London, the Matchmakers' Union submitted the following resolution:

That this Congress presses upon the workers of all countries in which matches are manufactured the necessity in the interest of the health of the employees, of bringing influence to bear on the respective Governments in order that the use of poisonous phosphorus shall be prohibited by law, and that till this is accomplished it appeals to all workingmen and women to buy none but non-poisonous matches.

In 1901, the managing director Bryant & May announced it had stopped using yellow phosphorus. The White Phosphorus Matches Prohibition Act 1908 (8 Edw. 7. c. 42) was passed. This prohibited "the use of the substance usually known as white or yellow phosphorus in the manufacture of matches". This came into force in January 1910.

== Key figures ==
- Sarah Chapman (President)
- Annie Besant (Secretary)
- Herbert Burrows (Treasurer)
- Kate Sclater
- Mrs Thornton Smith (Secretary, following Annie Besant's resignation)

== Influence ==
The Matchmakers' Union was dissolved in 1903, but both the 1888 strike and subsequent unionisation exerted significant influence on the wider trade union movement. During the eight years following the Union's formation, the number of women trade unionists swelled from 40,000 to 118,000. Graham Johnson has suggested that "the success of the matchgirls, and their subsequent Matchmaker’s Union, arguably bolstered the momentum of both the burgeoning trades unions and the Great Dock Strike the following year, paving the way for the UK’s new labour movement." In 2020, a motion was tabled in Parliament remembering "the matchgirls as pioneers of gender equality and fairness at work who through their strike action and formation of the Union of Women Match Makers left a lasting legacy on the trade union movement".

In 2022, the Match Girls' Strike was commemorated with an English Heritage blue plaque on the former Bryant & May factory.

== See also ==
- Women's Trade Union League
- Matchgirls' strike
