= Sarah Chapman =

English labor activist (1862–1945)

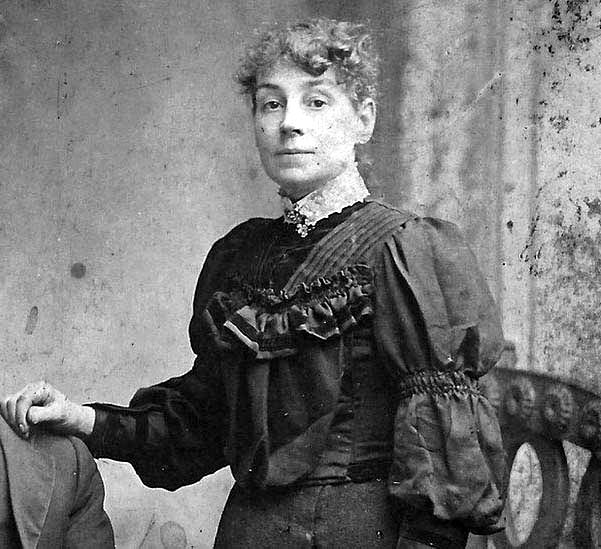
- Chapman c. 1900
- Born: Sarah Chapman; 31 October 1862; Mile End, London
- Died: 27 November 1945 (aged 83); England
- Resting place: Manor Park Cemetery, East London, England
- Monuments: Sarah Chapman House, Bow, London
- Occupations: Matchmaking machinist; trade unionist
- Employer: Bryant & May
- Organization: Union of Women Matchmakers (President)
- Known for: Playing a leading role in the organisation of the 1888 matchgirls' strike
- Spouse: Charles Henry Dearman (m. 1891; died 1922)
- Children: 6

Sarah Chapman (later Dearman; 31 October 1862 – 27 November 1945) was a British trade unionist who was one of the leaders of the 1888 Bryant & May matchgirls' strike. Chapman and others involved in the strike have since been recognised as "pioneers of sex equality and fairness at work who left a lasting legacy on the trade union movement".

== About Sarah Chapman ==
Sarah Chapman was born on 31 October 1862, the fifth of seven children born to Samuel Chapman, a brewer's servant, and Sarah Ann Mackenzie. Her early life was spent in Mile End, and Chapman would live her whole life in London's East End. By 19, alongside her mother and elder sister, Sarah was employed as a matchmaking machinist at Bryant & May. By the time of the 1888 strike, Sarah Chapman occupied a comparably well-waged position at the Bryant & May factory and was an established member of its workforce.

In December 1891, Sarah married Charles Henry Dearman, a cabinet maker. The couple had their first child, Sarah Elsie, in 1892, going on to have five more. The family later moved to Bethnal Green, where Sarah remained for the rest of her life. Charles Henry Dearman died in 1922.

Sarah Dearman died in Bethnal Green hospital on 27 November 1945, at the age of 83, and was survived by three of her six children. Along with five other elderly people, Sarah Dearman was buried in an unmarked grave in Manor Park Cemetery.

== Leadership of the matchgirls' strike ==
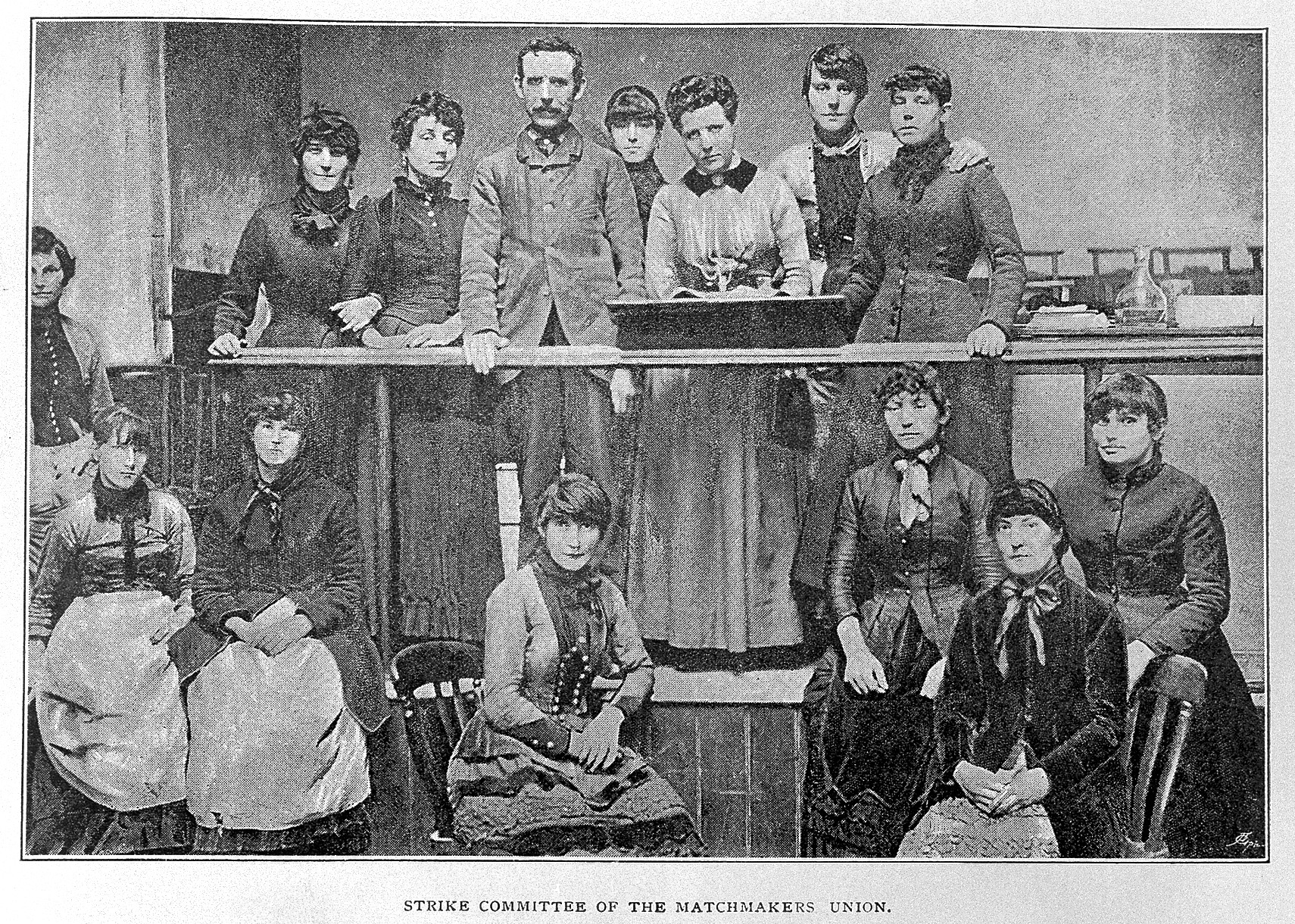
Strike committee of the Matchmakers' Union, showing Sarah Chapman (back row, second from left) alongside Herbert Burrows and Annie Besant

In June 1888, at a meeting of the Fabian Society, members agreed to a proposed boycott of Bryant & May matches in response to the poor factory conditions and mistreatment of workers.

Freethinker and reformer Annie Besant later met with workers outside the factory to learn more, publishing an article, "White Slavery in London" in The Link on 23 June. Although Bryant & May attempted to coerce employees to sign statements rejecting the claims, the workers refused. On 5 July 1888, approximately 1,400 girls and women walked out on strike.

The next day, 200 women marched to Bouverie Street, seeking the support of Annie Besant. Chapman was one of three women who met with Besant, securing her assistance in forming a strike committee. Mary Naulls, Mary Cummings, Sarah Chapman, Alice Francis, Kate Slater, Mary Driscoll, Jane Wakeling, and Eliza Martin were this committee's first members. The women held public meetings, gained sympathetic press coverage, and were able to enlist the support of various MPs. Chapman and the Strike Committee also received help from Toynbee Hall and the London Trades Council, and – following a meeting with Bryant & May management – their list of demands was agreed to.

The women subsequently established a union (the Union of Women Matchmakers), the inaugural meeting of which took place at Stepney Meeting Hall on 27 July. Twelve women were elected to the committee, including Chapman, who was subsequently made President. It was the largest female union in the country. Chapman was elected as the Union's first representative to the Trades Union Congress (TUC), and was among those who attended the 1888 International Trades Union Congress in London, and the 1890 Congress in Liverpool.

== Legacy ==
Since 2019, a charitable organisation called The Matchgirls Memorial have sought to raise awareness of the matchgirls' strike and its participants. Donations were received for the creation of a headstone for Sarah Chapman, and the charity aims to erect a statue in commemoration of strikers and organisers.

In 2020, responding to a plan by the Manor Park Cemetery to mound over the grave of Sarah Chapman, a petition was raised calling for the grave's protection. In July of that year, a motion was tabled in Parliament expressing concern over this planned destruction of Sarah Chapman's burial site. The motion, sponsored by Apsana Begum, Rushanara Ali, John Cryer, Jim Shannon, Alison Thewliss, and Ian Lavery said:

That this House is alarmed at the imminent plans to mound the grave of Sarah Dearman (nee Chapman), a key organiser of the matchgirl's strike in 1888 in Manor Park Cemetery, East London; notes that Sarah Chapman played a leading role in the historic strike and that the matchgirls as pioneers of gender equality and fairness at work who through their strike action and formation of the Union of Women Match Makers left a lasting legacy on the trade union movement; believes that Sarah Chapman's grave is of special historic interest and illustrates important aspects of social, economic and political history; calls on the Government to intervene to stop the imminent loss of an important piece of London's rich and diverse history; and further calls on the Government to inspect the mounding process to ensure that there is no disturbance of early burials when new graves are dug.

In 2021, it was announced that a new housing development in Bow would be named after Sarah Chapman.

In 2022 English Heritage announced that the Matchgirls' Strike would be commemorated with a blue plaque at site of the former Bryant and May factory in Bow, London. The plaque was unveiled at Bow Quarter, Fairfield Road, Tower Hamlets on 5 July 2022 by former EastEnders actress and patron of The Matchgirls Memorial Anita Dobson, who "grew up aware of the courage and bravery of these women who against all odds went on strike for better working conditions." Also present at the event was Chapman's great-granddaughter Sam Johnson, a trustee of The Match Girls Memorial, who described the Match Girls as "a huge inspiration for young people in the 21st century, as many of the issues they fought against still resonate so strongly today."

== Popular culture ==
Chapman appears as a character in the 2022 Netflix film Enola Holmes 2, played by actress Hannah Dodd. The film provides a fictionalized account of the origins of the Matchgirls' Strike, in which both the title character and her brother Sherlock become entangled.
