= Andy Wilson (director) =

British film, TV and theatre director (born 1958)

Andy Wilson (born 1958) is a British film, TV and theatre director.

== Early career ==
Wilson began his career as a performer with Circus Lumière. He was one of the directors (with Cindy Oswin, Brian Lipson and Peter Godfrey) of the experimental theatre group Rational Theatre and also a performer with Archaos, the celebrated anarchist French circus troupe.

Wilson studied drama at Birmingham University from 1976 to 1979 and then worked as an actor for three years before joining the London-based Rational Theatre and subsequently establishing the Hidden Grin Theatre.

== Film and television directing ==
Wilson began his transition to film and television by directing numerous music videos, notably for techno duo Underworld. In 1984, he began writing for film with Rococo. Wilson's first opportunity as a director was in 1987 on Channel 4, Four Minutes with a spot titled "The Job".

In 1989, Wilson directed Bouinax in Love for the French television channel La Sept featuring the Archaos circus troupe. A film with Théâtre de Complicité for the newly formed Channel 4 led to a long career in British television, directing among others Cracker, An Evening with Gary Lineker, Gormenghast, Psychos, Spooks, The Forsyte Saga, Hotel Babylon and The Philanthropist for American network NBC. Wilson also directed the 1997 film Playing God with David Duchovny and Angelina Jolie and appeared as an actor in the Peter Greenaway film The Cook, the Thief, His Wife & Her Lover.

In 2009 Wilson directed "The Man Who Smiled", an episode of the second series of Wallander. He also directed the 2012 eight-episode drama Ripper Street which was shown on BBC One and BBC America. He returned to Ripper Street for the second (2013) and third series (2014). In 2016, Andy helmed episodes 4 and 7 of the BBC TV series World on Fire for Mammoth Screen.

Over the course of 5 consecutive series (from 2015 to present), Andy Wilson has been the sole director behind the long-running ITV drama series Unforgotten, starring Nicola Walker and Sanjeev Bhaskar.
