= Hannah Dodd (actress) =

English actress and model (born 1995)

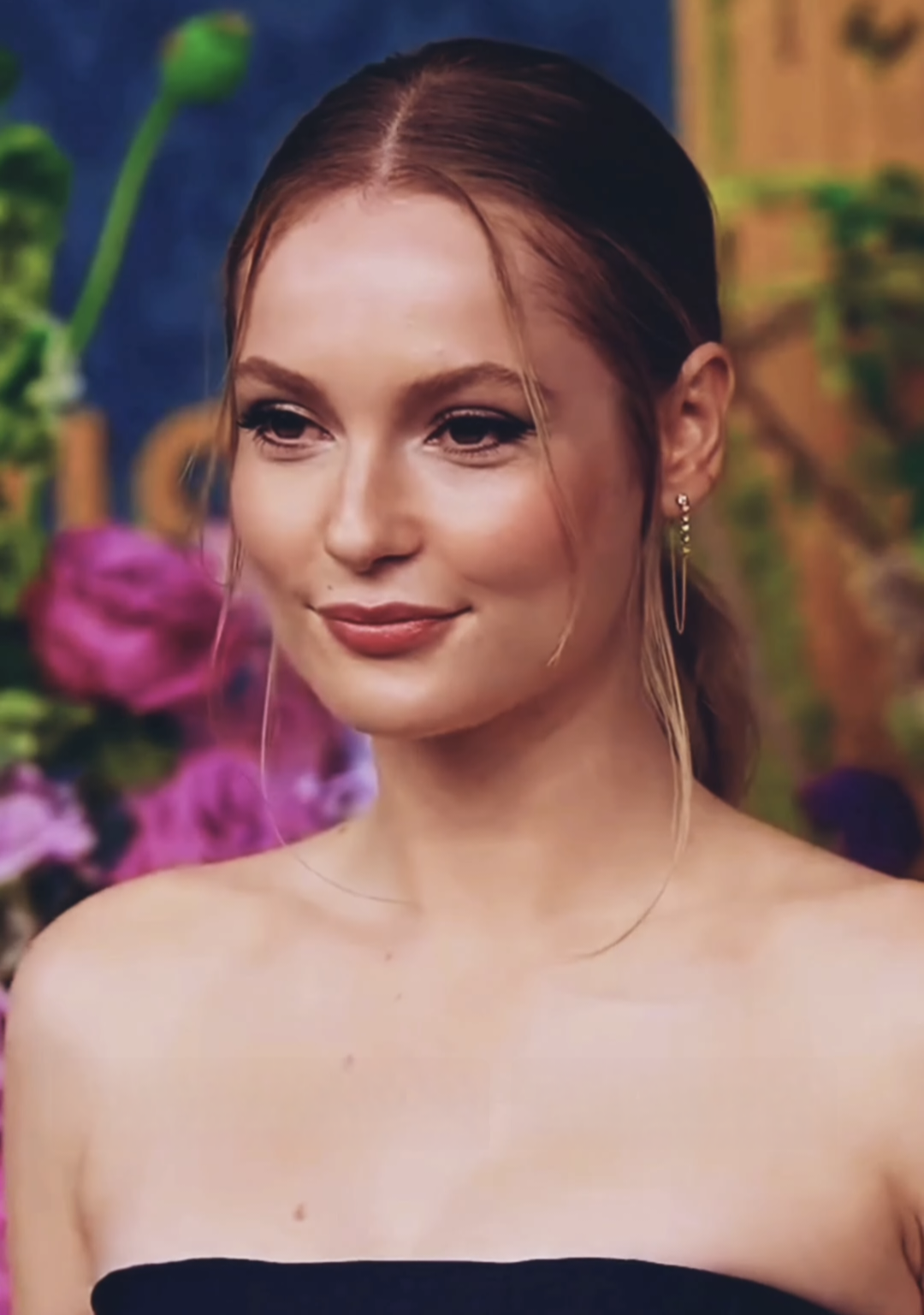
- Dodd in 2024
- Born: Hannah Francesca Katie Dodd; 17 May 1995 (age 31); Colchester, England
- Education: London Studio Centre
- Occupations: Actress; model; dancer
- Years active: 2011–present
- Height: 1.71 m (5 ft 7 1/2 in)
- Modelling information
- Eye colour: Hazel Green
- Agency: Select Model Management (London)

Hannah Francesca Katie Dodd (born 17 May 1995) is an English actress and model. She began her career in modeling and trained in dance before starring in Hulu teen series Find Me in Paris (2018–2020). She has since become known as Francesca in the Netflix period drama Bridgerton (2024–present).

== Early life and education ==
Dodd was born in Colchester and grew up in Leavenheath on the Essex–Suffolk border. She attended Ormiston Sudbury Academy. She has been dancing since she was two years old. She took a course at Evolution Foundation College, of which she is now a patron, before going on to graduate with a Bachelor of Arts in Theatre Dance from the London Studio Centre in 2017.

== Career ==
Dodd began her career in modeling and was 16 when she signed with Select Model Management, using the money she made from it to fund her dance training. She modeled for Primark, Topshop, Boden, and Monsoon Accessorize before landing a gig with Burberry in 2014 when she was 19 alongside Romeo Beckham.

In 2018, Dodd made her television debut in the Hulu series Find Me in Paris and Harlots as Thea Raphael, a main role, and Sophia Fitzwilliam, a recurring role respectively. She played Sandra, the illusionary adult form of Sprite in the 2021 Chloe Zhao-directed Marvel Cinematic Universe film Eternals. The following year, Dodd appeared as a young version of Sienna Miller's character during her university years in the 2022 Netflix miniseries Anatomy of a Scandal.

Also in 2022, Dodd played Sarah Chapman in the Netflix film Enola Holmes 2 and Corinne Foxworth in Flowers in the Attic: The Origin, a Lifetime miniseries prequel based on the novel Garden of Shadows. In May 2022, it was announced Dodd would replace Ruby Stokes in third season of the Shondaland-produced Netflix period drama Bridgerton as Francesca, the sixth Bridgerton child. In 2023, it was announced Dodd would be the face of Aveda's Botanical Repair campaign.

Starting May 2025, Dodd made her West End theatre debut as Sally Bowles in Cabaret at the Playhouse Theatre (now called The Kit Kat Club for this production) opposite Rob Madge for a limited run until September 2025.

== Filmography ==
Key
†	Denotes productions that have not yet been released

=== Film ===
Year	Title	Role	Notes	Ref.
2019	Fighting with My Family	Townie		
2021	Eternals	"Sandra"		
2022	Enola Holmes 2	Sarah Chapman / Cicely	Netflix film	
TBA	Family Secrets †	TBA	In production	

=== Television ===
Year	Title	Role	Notes	Ref.
2018–2020	Find Me in Paris	Dorothea "Thea" Raphael	Main role (series 1–2); recurring (series 3)	
2018–2019	Harlots	Sophia Fitzwilliam	Recurring role (series 2–3; 5 episodes)	
2020	Pandora	Jennifer	Episode: "Don't Think Twice, It's All Right"	
2022	Anatomy of a Scandal	Young Sophie Whitehouse	Miniseries; 4 episodes	
2022	Flowers in the Attic: The Origin	Corinne Foxworth	Miniseries	
2024–present	Bridgerton	Francesca Stirling (née Bridgerton), Countess of Kilmartin	Main role (season 3–present); 16 episodes	
2024	The Road Trip	Grace	3 episodes	

=== Theatre ===
Year	Title	Role	Venue	Ref.
2025	Cabaret	Sally Bowles	Playhouse Theatre	

=== Music video ===
Song	Year	Artist	Notes	Ref.
"Six Days in June"	2020	The Fratellis		
