= John Emsley =

UK popular science writer, broadcaster and academic

John Emsley (born 1938) is a UK popular science writer, broadcaster and academic specialising in chemistry. He researched and lectured at King's College London for 25 years, authoring or co-authoring about 100 papers, and then became Science Writer in Residence at Imperial College London in 1990. From 1997 to 2002 he was Science Writer in Residence at the Department of Chemistry at Cambridge University, England, during which time he started and wrote the newsletter Chem@Cam. He is the author of more than 12 books and several of them have been translated into other languages.

== Newspaper column ==
For six years Emsley wrote a column on chemistry for The Independent called "Molecule of the Month".

== Books ==
Emsley's published books include:

- More Molecules of Murder, (London): Royal Society of Chemistry, 2017.
- Chemhistory, Witley Press, 2017.
- Chemistry at Home. Exploring the Ingredient in Everyday Products, Cambridge UK: Royal Society of Chemistry, 2015.
- Elements of Fortune, ebook Witley Press, 2014.
- Chemystery, Witley Press, 2013.
- The Newsletter. An EPIC tale of spin, ebook Publicola Publishing ISBN 978-0-95722771-2, 2013.
- Sweet Dreams, Nightmare Days, Witley Press, 2013.
- Islington Green: A Book of Revelation, Witley Press, 2012.
- A Healthy, Wealthy, Sustainable World, Cambridge UK: Royal Society of Chemistry, 2010.
- Molecules of Murder: Criminal Molecules and Classic Cases, Cambridge, UK: Royal Society of Chemistry, 2008.
- Better Looking, Better Living, Better Loving : how chemistry can help you achieve life's goals, Weinheim: Wiley-VCH 2007.
- The Elements of Murder, Oxford University Press, 2005.
- Vanity, Vitality, and Virility: the science behind the products you love to buy, Oxford University Press, 2004.
- Nature's Building Blocks: an A–Z Guide to the Elements, Oxford University Press, 2001. 2nd ed. 2011 Nature's building blocks : everything you need to know about the elements, Oxford; New York : Oxford University Press, 2011.
- Shocking History of Phosphorus, 2000. US Edition The 13th Element: The Sordid Tale of Murder, Fire, and Phosphorus, 2001.
- with P. Fell, Was it something you ate? Food intolerance, what causes it and how to avoid it, Oxford; New York: Oxford University Press, 1999.
- Molecules at an Exhibition : portraits of intriguing materials in everyday life, Oxford University Press, 1998.
- Parfum, Portwein, PVC ..., Weinheim : Wiley-VCH, 1997. In German.
- The Consumer's Good Chemical Guide: Separating Facts from Fiction about Everyday Products, W.H. Freeman, 1994. (Winner of the Rhone Poulenc Science Book Prize 1995). Also title The Consumer's Good Chemical Guide: a jargon-free guide to the chemicals of everyday life.
- The Elements, Oxford University Press, 1989, 2nd ed. 1991, 3rd ed. 1998.
- Complex chemistry, Berlin; New York : Springer, 1984. Series: Structure and bonding, 57.
- with C. Hall, The Chemistry of Phosphorus: environmental, organic, inorganic, biochemical, and spectroscopic aspects, Harper & Row, 1976.
- The inorganic chemistry of the non-metals, London: Methuen Educational (1971).
