= List of British films of 2022 =

This article lists feature-length British films and full-length documentaries that had their premiere in 2022 and were at least partly produced by the United Kingdom. It does not feature short films, medium-length films, made-for-TV films, pornographic films, filmed theater, VR films or interactive films, nor does it include films screened in previous years that have official release dates in 2022.

== British films box office ==
The highest-grossing independent British films released in 2022 according to the British Film Institute, by domestic box office gross revenue, are as follows:

Highest-grossing films of 2022
Rank	Title	Distributor	Domestic gross (£m)
1	Belfast	Universal	£15,561,083
2	The Banshees of Inisherin	Disney	£9,300,000
3	Operation Mincemeat	Warner Bros	£5,297,395
4	The Duke	Pathé/Warner Bros.	£5,247,749
5	Mrs. Harris Goes to Paris	Universal	£4,963,133
6	See How They Run	Disney	£4,858,629
7	Living	Lionsgate	£3,800,000
8	Fisherman's Friends: One and All	Entertainment Film Distributors	£3,200,000
9	The Railway Children Return	StudioCanal	£3,000,000
10	The Phantom of the Open	Eone Films	£2,000,000

=== U.K. qualifying films of 2022 ===
The highest-grossing U.K. qualifying British films released in 2022 according to the British Film Institute, by domestic box office gross revenue, are as follows:

Highest-grossing U.K. qualifying films of 2022
Rank	Title	Distributor	Domestic gross (£m)
1	Doctor Strange in the Multiverse of Madness	Walt Disney	£42,200,000
2	The Batman	Warner Bros	£40,800,000
3	Jurassic World Dominion	Universal Pictures	£35,100,000
4	Roald Dahl's Matilda the Musical	Sony Pictures	£28,007,737
5	Fantastic Beasts: The Secrets of Dumbledore	Warner Bros	£20,900,000
6	Belfast	Universal	£15,561,083
7	Downton Abbey: A New Era	Universal	£15,092,058
8	The Banshees of Inisherin	Disney	£9,300,000
9	Death on the Nile	Disney	£8,000,000
10	Morbius	Sony	£6,400,000

== Film premieres ==
=== January–March ===
Opening		Title	Cast and crew	Distributor	Ref.
J A N U A R Y	6	Book of Love	Director: Analeine Cal y Mayor; Cast: Sam Claflin, Verónica Echegui	Vertigo Films	
J A N U A R Y	14	The House	Director: Emma de Swaef, Marc James Roels, Niki Lindroth von Bahr, Paloma Baeza; Cast: Mia Goth, Claudie Blakley, Matthew Goode, Mark Heap, Miranda Richardson, Stephanie Cole, Jarvis Cocker, Dizzee Rascal, Will Sharpe, Paul Kaye, Susan Wokoma, Helena Bonham Carter	Netflix	
J A N U A R Y	14	Save the Cinema	Director: Sara Sugarman; Cast: Jonathan Pryce, Samantha Morton, Tom Felton, Adeel Akhtar, Susan Wokoma	Sky Cinema	
J A N U A R Y	19	The Princess	Director: Ed Perkins; Cast: Princess Diana	Altitude Film Distribution	
J A N U A R Y	21	Living	Director: Oliver Hermanus; Cast: Bill Nighy, Aimee Lou Wood, Alex Sharp, Tom Burke	Lionsgate UK	
J A N U A R Y	21	Nothing Compares	Director: Kathryn Ferguson; Cast: Sinéad O'Connor	Showtime	
J A N U A R Y	22	Good Luck to You, Leo Grande	Director: Sophie Hyde; Cast: Emma Thompson, Daryl McCormack	Lionsgate	
J A N U A R Y	23	Brian and Charles	Director: Jim Archer; Cast: David Earl, Chris Hayward, Louise Brealey	Universal Pictures	
J A N U A R Y	24	My Old School	Director: Jono McLeod; Cast: Alan Cumming, Clare Grogan, Lulu	Dogwoof	
F E B R U A R Y	9	Death on the Nile	Director: Kenneth Branagh; Cast: Kenneth Branagh, Tom Bateman, Annette Bening, Russell Brand, Ali Fazal, Dawn French, Gal Gadot, Armie Hammer, Rose Leslie, Emma Mackey, Sophie Okonedo, Jennifer Saunders, Letitia Wright	20th Century Studios	
F E B R U A R Y	11	Flux Gourmet	Director: Peter Strickland; Cast: Asa Butterfield, Gwendoline Christie, Ariane Labed, Fatma Mohamed, Makis Papadimitriou, Richard Bremmer	IFC Films	
M A R C H	9	Fading Petals	Director: Bradley Charlton Cast: Melanie Revill, Charlotte Reidie, Tom Metcalf, Gary Raymond	Crazy Goose Productions	
M A R C H	14	It Is In Us All	Director: Antonia Campbell-Hughes; Cast: Cosmo Jarvis, Rhys Mannion, Claes Bang, Antonia Campbell-Hughes	Blue Finch Films Releasing	
M A R C H	15	Blank	Director: Natalie Kennedy; Cast: Rachel Shelley, Heida Reed, Wayne Brady	Sparky Pictures	
M A R C H	18	The Nan Movie	Director: Josie Rourke; Cast: Catherine Tate, Mathew Horne, Niky Wardley, Katherine Parkinson	Warner Bros.	
M A R C H	21	Assailant	Director: Tom Paton; Cast: Poppy Delevingne, Casper Van Dien, Jeff Fahey, Chad Michael Collins	Redbox Entertainment	
M A R C H	30	Across the River and into the Trees	Director: Peter Flannery; Cast: Liev Schreiber, Matilda De Angelis, Danny Huston, Josh Hutcherson, Laura Morante, Javier Cámara		

=== April–June ===
Opening		Title	Cast and crew	Distributor	Ref.
A P R I L	1	Elizabeth: A Portrait in Parts	Director: Roger Michell	Signature Entertainment	
A P R I L	15	Choose or Die	Director: Toby Meakins; Cast: Asa Butterfield, Iola Evans, Eddie Marsan, Robert Englund	Netflix	
A P R I L	25	Downton Abbey: A New Era	Director: Simon Curtis; Cast: Hugh Bonneville, Jim Carter, Michelle Dockery, Elizabeth McGovern, Maggie Smith, Imelda Staunton, Penelope Wilton, Hugh Dancy, Laura Haddock, Nathalie Baye, Dominic West	Universal Pictures/Focus Features	
M A Y	19	God's Creatures	Director: Saela Davis, Anna Rose Holmer; Cast: Emily Watson, Paul Mescal, Aisling Franciosi, Declan Conlon, Toni O'Rourke		
M A Y	20	Enys Men	Director: Mark Jenkin; Cast: John Woodvine, Mary Woodvine, Edward Rowe		
M A Y	20	Men	Director: Alex Garland; Cast: Jessie Buckley, Rory Kinnear, Paapa Essiedu	Entertainment Film Distributors	
M A Y	21	Aftersun	Director: Charlotte Wells; Cast: Paul Mescal, Frankie Corio	Mubi	
M A Y	21	Triangle of Sadness	Director: Ruben Östlund; Cast: Harris Dickinson, Charlbi Dean, Dolly de Leon, Zlatko Burić, Iris Berben, Vicki Berlin	Curzon	
M A Y	23	Crimes of the Future	Director: David Cronenberg; Cast: Viggo Mortensen, Léa Seydoux, Kristen Stewart, Scott Speedman	Vertigo Films	
M A Y	24	The Silent Twins	Director: Agnieszka Smoczyńska; Cast: Letitia Wright, Tamara Lawrance, Nadine Marshall	Universal Pictures	
J U N E	11	Aisha	Director: Frank Berry; Cast: Letitia Wright, Josh O'Connor	Sky Cinema	
J U N E	17	The Lost Girls	Director: Livia De Paolis; Cast: Livia De Paolis, Louis Partridge, Emily Carey, Ella-Rae Smith, Joely Richardson, Iain Glen, Vanessa Redgrave	Based on The Lost Girls by Laurie Fox; Myriad Pictures	
J U N E	22	The Other Fellow	Director: Matthew Bauer; Cast: Gunnar James Bond Schäfer, James Alexander Bond, James Bond Jr., Gregory Itzin, Charley Palmer Rothwell	Bulldog Film Distribution	

=== July–September ===
Opening		Title	Cast and crew	Distributor	Ref.
J U L Y	1	Mr. Malcolm's List	Director: Emma Holly Jones; Cast: Freida Pinto, Sope Dirisu, Oliver Jackson-Cohen, Ashley Park, Zawe Ashton, Theo James	Vertigo Releasing	
J U L Y	5	Joyride	Director: Emer Reynolds; Cast: Olivia Colman, Charlie Reid, Lochlann Ó Mearáin	Vertigo Releasing	
J U L Y	11	Mrs. Harris Goes to Paris	Director: Anthony Fabian; Cast: Lesley Manville, Isabelle Huppert, Jason Isaacs, Lambert Wilson, Alba Baptista, Lucas Bravo, Rose Williams	Universal Pictures	
J U L Y	15	The Railway Children Return	Director: Morgan Matthews; Cast: Jenny Agutter Tom Courtenay, Sheridan Smith	StudioCanal	
J U L Y	27	Rogue Agent	Director: Adam Patterson, Declan Lawn; Cast: James Norton, Gemma Arterton, Shazad Latif, Marisa Abela, Edwina Findley, Julian Barratt	Netflix	
A U G U S T	5	LOLA	Director: Andrew Legge; Cast: Emma Appleton, Stefanie Martini, Rory Fleck Byrne	Bankside Films	
A U G U S T	13	The Loneliest Boy in the World	Director: Martin Owen; Cast: Max Harwood, Hero Fiennes Tiffin, Susan Wokoma, Evan Ross, Tallulah Haddon		
A U G U S T	19	Fisherman's Friends: One and All	Directors: Meg Leonard, Nick Moorcroft; Cast: James Purefoy, Richard Harrington, Fiona Button	Entertainment Film Distributors	
A U G U S T	19	I Came By	Directors: Babak Anvari; Cast: George MacKay, Percelle Ascott, Kelly Macdonald, Hugh Bonneville	Netflix	
A U G U S T	31	White Noise	Director: Noah Baumbach; Cast: Adam Driver, Greta Gerwig, Don Cheadle	Netflix	
S E P T E M B E R	1	Bobi Wine: The People's President	Directors: Christopher Sharp and Moses Bwayo	National Geographic Documentary Films	
S E P T E M B E R	2	Burial	Director: Ben Parker; Cast: Charlotte Vega, Harriet Walter, Tom Felton, Barry Ward, Dan Renton Skinner		
S E P T E M B E R	2	Lady Chatterley's Lover	Director: Laure de Clermont-Tonnerre; Cast: Emma Corrin, Jack O'Connell, Matthew Duckett, Ella Hunt, Faye Marsay, Joely Richardson	Searchlight Pictures	
S E P T E M B E R	2	The Wonder	Director: Sebastián Lelio; Cast: Florence Pugh, Tom Burke, Niamh Algar, Elaine Cassidy, Dermot Crowley	Netflix	
S E P T E M B E R	3	Argentina, 1985	Director: Santiago Mitre; Cast: Ricardo Darín, Peter Lanzani, Alejandra Flechner, Norman Briski	Amazon Studios	
S E P T E M B E R	3	Empire of Light	Director: Sam Mendes; Cast: Olivia Colman, Micheal Ward, Tom Brooke, Tanya Moodie, Hannah Onslow, Crystal Clarke, Toby Jones, Colin Firth	Searchlight Pictures	
S E P T E M B E R	5	The Banshees of Inisherin	Director: Martin McDonagh; Cast: Colin Farrell, Brendan Gleeson, Kerry Condon, Barry Keoghan	Searchlight Pictures	
S E P T E M B E R	5	My Name Is Alfred Hitchcock	Director: Mark Cousins		
S E P T E M B E R	6	The Eternal Daughter	Director: Joanna Hogg; Cast: Tilda Swinton, Joseph Mydell, Carly-Sophia Davies	A24	
S E P T E M B E R	7	The Son	Director: Florian Zeller; Cast: Hugh Jackman, Laura Dern, Vanessa Kirby, Zen McGrath, Anthony Hopkins	Lionsgate	
S E P T E M B E R	9	Emily	Director: Frances O'Connor; Cast: Emma Mackey, Fionn Whitehead	Warner Bros. Pictures	
S E P T E M B E R	9	Klokkenluider	Director: Neil Maskell; Cast: Amit Shah, Sura Dohnke, Tom Burke, Roger Evans, Jenna Coleman	Warner Bros. Pictures	
S E P T E M B E R	9	See How They Run	Director: Tom George; Cast: Sam Rockwell, Saoirse Ronan, Adrien Brody, Ruth Wilson, Reece Shearsmith, Harris Dickinson, David Oyelowo	Searchlight Pictures	
S E P T E M B E R	10	A Gaza Weekend	Director: Basil Khalil; Cast: Maria Zreik, Adam Bakri, Stephen Mangan, Mouna Hawa, Loai Noufi		
S E P T E M B E R	10	The Hanging Sun	Director: Francesco Carrozzini; Cast: Alessandro Borghi, Jessica Brown Findlay, Sam Spruell, Frederick Schmidt	Vision Distribution; Based on Midnight Sun by Jo Nesbø	
S E P T E M B E R	10	The Lost King	Director: Stephen Frears; Cast: Sally Hawkins, Steve Coogan, Harry Lloyd	Pathé/Warner Bros.	
S E P T E M B E R	10	What's Love Got to Do with It?	Director: Shekhar Kapur; Cast: Lily James, Shazad Latif, Shabana Azmi, Emma Thompson	StudioCanal	
S E P T E M B E R	11	Allelujah	Director: Richard Eyre; Cast: Jennifer Saunders. Bally Gill, Russell Tovey, David Bradley, Derek Jacobi, Judi Dench	Warner Bros. Entertainment UK	
S E P T E M B E R	11	My Policeman	Director: Michael Grandage; Cast: Harry Styles, Emma Corrin, David Dawson, Linus Roache, Gina Mckee, Rupert Everett	Amazon Studios	
S E P T E M B E R	11	While We Watched	Director: Vinay Shukla; Cast: Ravish Kumar, Sushil Bahuguna, Deepak Chaubey, Sushil Mohapatra, Swarolipi Sengupta, Saurabh Shukla	MetFilm Distribution	
S E P T E M B E R	12	Catherine Called Birdy	Director: Lena Dunham; Cast: Lena Dunham, Billie Piper, Andrew Scott, Bella Ramsey, Joe Alwyn Dean-Charles Chapman	Amazon Studios	
S E P T E M B E R	26	The Almond and the Seahorse	Director: Celyn Jones, Tom Stern; Cast: Trine Dyrholm, Meera Syal, Rebel Wilson, Charlotte Gainsbourg		

=== October–December ===
Opening		Title	Cast and crew	Distributor	Ref.
O C T O B E R	1	Renegades	Director: Daniel Zirilli; Cast: Nick Moran, Lee Majors, Ian Ogilvy, Louis Mandylor, Michael Paré, Danny Trejo, Patsy Kensit, Billy Murray	Shogun Films	
O C T O B E R	5	Roald Dahl's Matilda the Musical	Director: Matthew Warchus; Cast: Alisha Weir, Lashana Lynch, Stephen Graham, Andrea Riseborough, Emma Thompson	Sony Pictures Releasing International	
O C T O B E R	6	The Origin	Director: Andrew Cumming; Cast: Safia Oakley-Green, Chuku Modu, Kit Young	Signature Entertainment	
O C T O B E R	14	Inland	Director: Fridtjof Ryder; Cast: Mark Rylance, Rory Alexander, Kathryn Hunter	Verve Pictures	
O C T O B E R	14	She Is Love	Director: Jamie Adams; Cast: Haley Bennett, Sam Riley, Marisa Abela	Signature Entertainment	
N O V E M B E R	4	Enola Holmes 2	Director: Harry Bradbeer; Cast: Millie Bobby Brown, Henry Cavill, Adeel Akhtar, Helena Bonham Carter	Netflix	
N O V E M B E R	13	The Amazing Maurice	Director: Toby Genkel, Florian Westermann; Cast: Hugh Laurie, Emilia Clarke, David Thewlis, Himesh Patel, Gemma Arterton, Hugh Bonneville	STX Entertainment	
N O V E M B E R	18	Scrooge: A Christmas Carol	Director: Stephen Donnelly; Cast: Luke Evans, Olivia Colman, Jessie Buckley, Jonathan Pryce, Johnny Flynn, James Cosmo	Netflix	
N O V E M B E R	19	Typist Artist Pirate King	Director: Carol Morley; Cast: Monica Dolan, Kelly Macdonald, Gina McKee	Modern Films; Based on the life of Audrey Amiss	
D E C E M B E R	2	Your Christmas or Mine?	Director: Jim O'Hanlon; Cast: Asa Butterfield, Cora Kirk, Daniel Mays, Angela Griffin, Harriet Walter, Alex Jennings	Amazon Studios	
D E C E M B E R	9	This Is Christmas	Director: Chris Foggin; Cast: Alfred Enoch, Kaya Scodelario, Nadia Parkes, Timothy Spall, Ben Miller, Jeremy Irvine	Sky Cinema	
D E C E M B E R	16	The Honeymoon	Director: Dean Craig; Cast: Maria Bakalova, Pico Alexander, Asim Chaudhry, Lucas Bravo	Amazon Studios	

=== Other premieres ===
Title	Director	Release date	Ref.
25 Years of UK Garage	Terry Stone, Richard Turner	5 December 2022	
Blue Jean	Georgia Oakley	3 September 2022 (Venice Film Festival - Giornate degli Autori)	
Cerebrum	Sebastien Blanc	27 August 2022 (FrightFest)	
Elephant Mother	Jez Lewis, Jocelyn Cammack	9 August 2022 (ARTE)	
The Felling - an Epic Tale of People Power	Eve Wood, Jaqui Bellamy	20 March 2022	
The Fence	William Stone	2 September 2022	
Husband	Josh Appignanesi	16 August 2022 (Edinburgh International Film Festival)	
If These Walls Could Sing	Mary McCartney	3 September 2022	
Leaving to Remain	Mira Erdevicki	19 October 2022	
Lionesses: How Football Came Home	Poppy de Villeneuve	12 October 2022	
Much Ado	Anna-Elizabeth Shakespeare, Hillary Shakespeare	1 April 2022	
Name Me Lawand	Edward Lovelace	8 October 2022 (London Film Festival)	
Never Forget Tibet	Jean-Paul Mertinez	31 March 2022	
Poison Arrows	Simon Sprackling	28 July 2022 (Brno Film Festival)	
Pretty Red Dress	Dionne Edwards	9 October 2022 (BFI London Film Festival)	
Quintessentially British	Frank Mannion	12 August 2022	
The Spider-Man of Sudan	Phil Cox, Rafa Renas	17 May 2022	
Squaring the Circle (The Story of Hipgnosis)	Anton Corbijn	4 September 2022	
A Story of Bones	Joseph Curran, Dominic Aubrey de Vere	June 2022 (Tribeca Film Festival)	
Three Day Millionaire	Jack Spring	25 November 2022	
Three Minutes: A Lengthening	Bianca Stigter	7 April 2022	
A Touch of Vengeance	Jordan-Kane Lewis	5 February 2022	
Wait For Me	Keith Farrell	2 June 2022	
What Remains	Ran Huang	14 October 2022 (Warsaw Film Festival)	
Winners	Hassan Nazer	13 August 2022 (Edinburgh International Film Festival)	
Year of the Dog	Paul Sng	10 January 2022	

=== Culturally British films ===
The following list comprises films not produced by Great Britain or the United Kingdom but is strongly associated with British culture. The films in this list should fulfil at least three of the following criteria:

- The film is adapted from a British source material.
- The story is at least partially set in the United Kingdom.
- The film was at least partially shot in the United Kingdom.
- Many of the film's cast and crew members are British.

She Said, Dalíland, The Batman and Doctor Strange in the Multiverse of Madness fulfill two of the criteria.

== Events ==
=== British Academy Film Awards ===
The 75th British Academy Film Awards was held on 13 March 2022.

== British winners ==
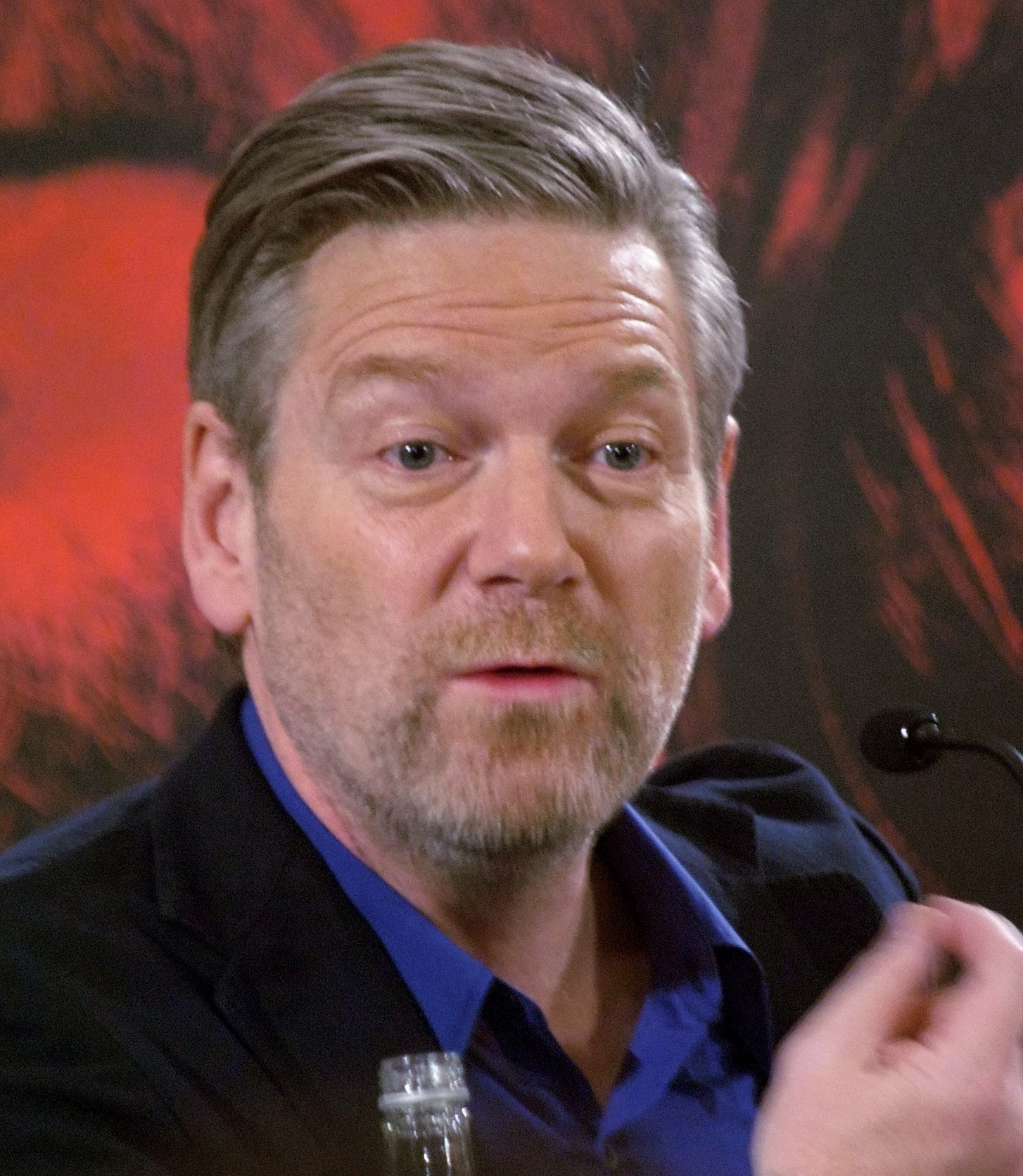
Kenneth Branagh received multiple awards and nominations for writing and directing Belfast.

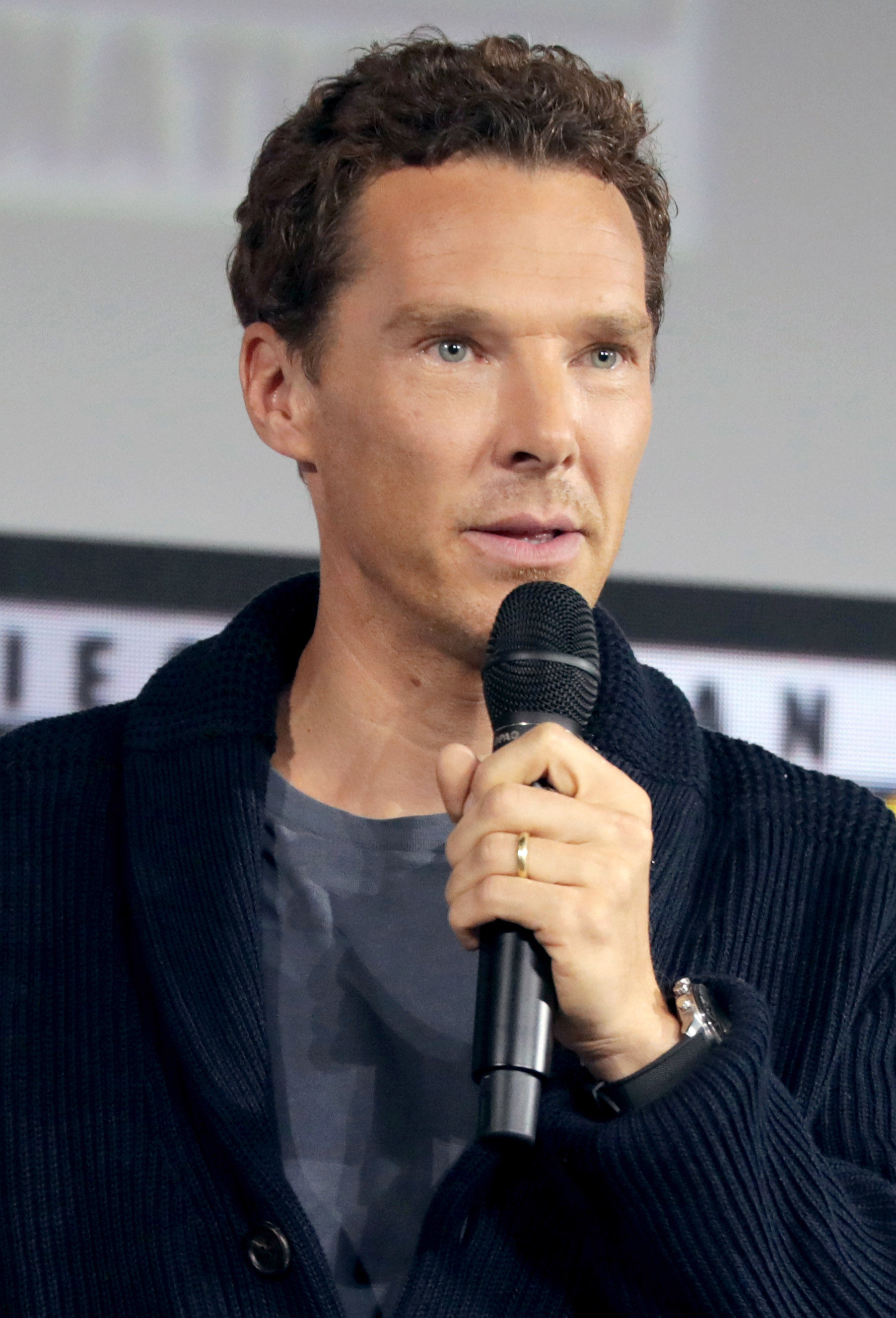
Benedict Cumberbatch received multiple awards and nominations for his role in The Power of the Dog.

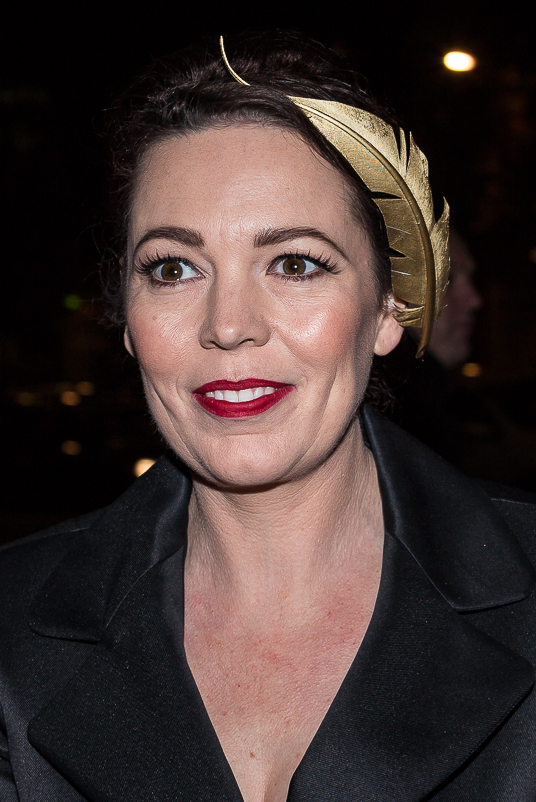
Olivia Colman received multiple nominations for her role in The Lost Daughter.

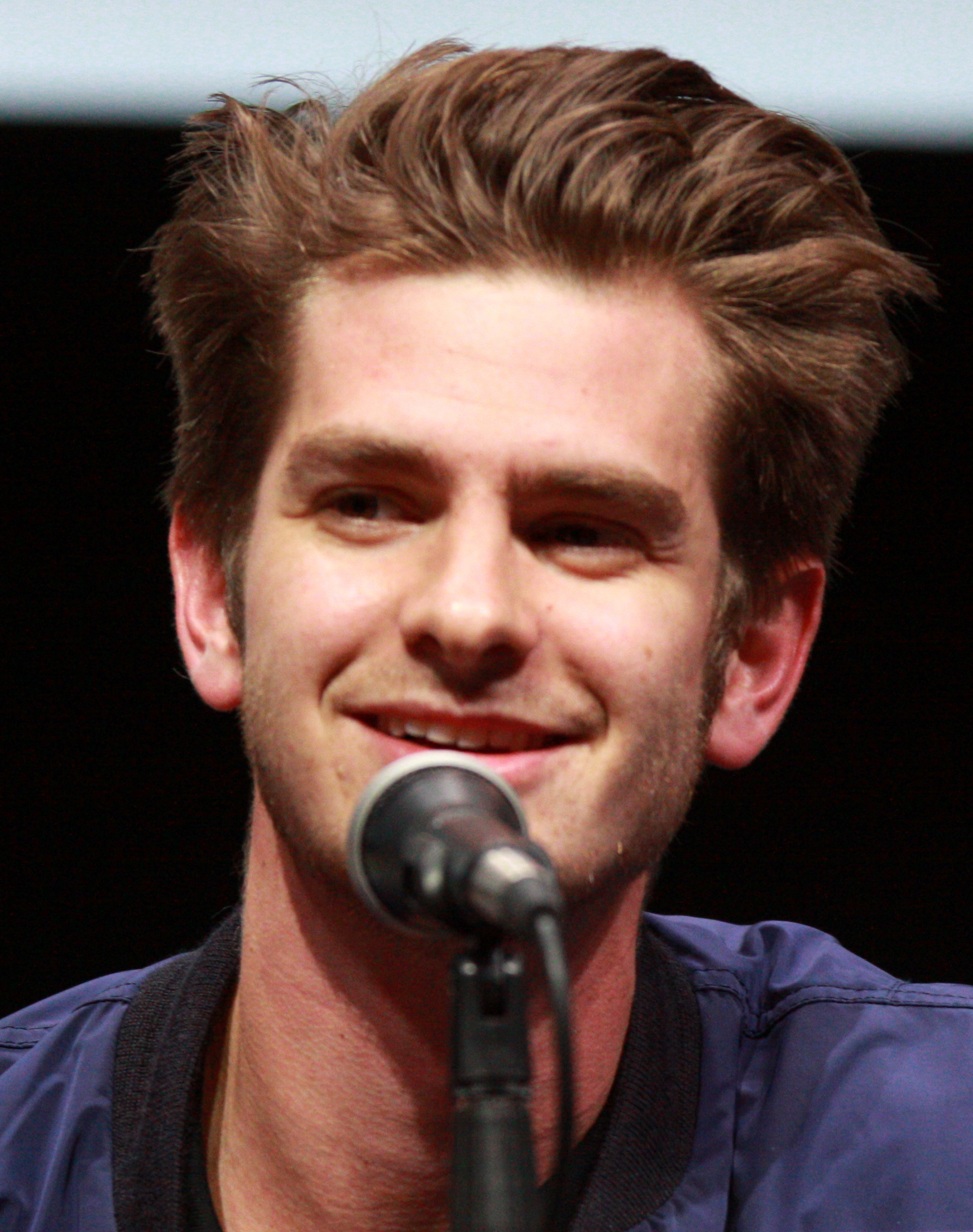
Andrew Garfield received multiple nominations for his role in Tick, Tick... Boom!.

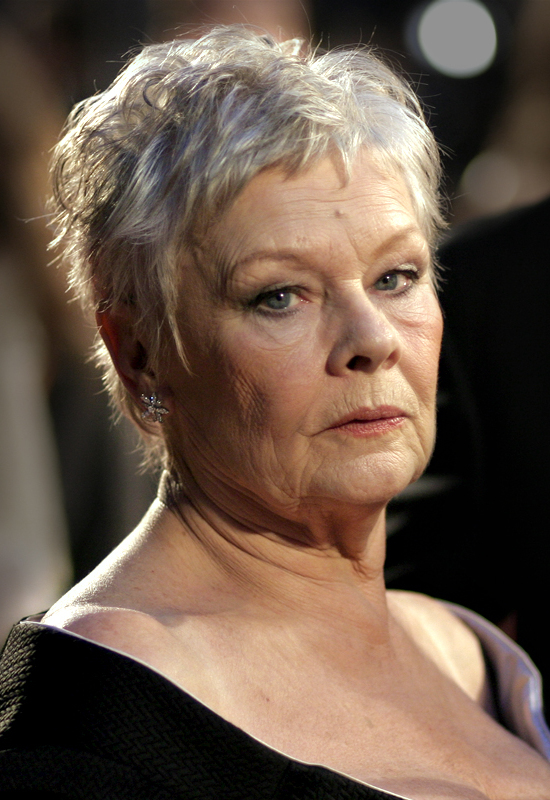
Judi Dench received multiple nominations for her supporting role in Belfast.

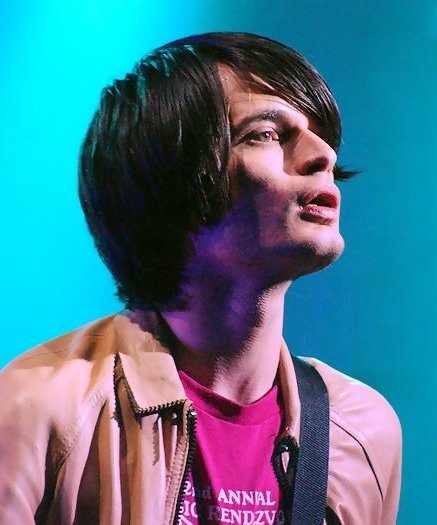
Jonny Greenwood received multiple Best Original Score nominations for The Power of the Dog.

Listed here are the British winners and nominees at two of the most prestigious film award ceremonies in the English-speaking world: the Academy Awards and the Golden Globe Awards, celebrating the best films of 2021 and early 2022.

=== Academy Awards ===
The 94th Academy Awards were held on March 27, 2022.

British winners:

- Belfast (Best Original Screenplay)
- No Time to Die (Best Original Song)
- The Power of the Dog (Best Director)
- Jenny Beavan for Cruella (Best Costume Design)
- Joe Walker for Dune (Best Film Editing)
- Kenneth Branagh for Belfast (Best Original Screenplay)
- Linda Dowds for The Eyes of Tammy Faye (Best Makeup and Hairstyling)
- Paul Lambert for Dune (Best Visual Effects)
- Riz Ahmed for The Long Goodbye (Best Live Action Short Film)
- Theo Green for Dune (Best Sound)
- Tristan Myles for Dune (Best Visual Effects)
- The Long Goodbye (Best Live Action Short Film)

British nominees:

- Belfast (Best Picture, Best Director, Best Supporting Actor, Best Supporting Actress, Best Original Song, Best Sound)
- Cyrano (Best Costume Design)
- No Time to Die (Best Sound, Best Visual Effects)
- Flee (Best Animated Feature Film, Best International Feature Film, Best Documentary Feature)
- The Power of the Dog (Best Picture, Best Actor, Best Supporting Actor, Best Supporting Actress, Best Adapted Screenplay, Best Original Score, Best Sound, Best Production Design, Best Cinematography, Best Film Editing)
- Spencer (Best Actress)
- Andrew Garfield for Tick, Tick... Boom! (Best Actor)
- Andy Nelson for West Side Story (Best Sound)
- Benedict Cumberbatch for The Power of the Dog (Best Actor)
- Charlie Noble for No Time to Die (Best Visual Effects)
- Chris Corbould for No Time to Die (Best Visual Effects)
- Christopher Townsend for Shang-Chi and the Legend of the Ten Rings (Best Visual Effects)
- Denise Yarde for Belfast (Best Sound)
- Donald Mowat for Dune (Best Makeup and Hairstyling)
- Iain Canning for The Power of the Dog (Best Picture)
- James Harrison for No Time to Die (Best Sound)
- James Mather for No Time to Die (Best Sound)
- Joanna Quinn for Affairs of the Art (Best Animated Short Film)
- Joel Green for No Time to Die (Best Visual Effects)
- Jonathan Fawkner for No Time to Die (Best Visual Effects)
- Jonny Greenwood for The Power of the Dog (Best Original Score)
- Judi Dench for Belfast (Best Supporting Actress)
- Julia Vernon for Cruella (Best Makeup and Hairstyling)
- Kenneth Branagh for Belfast (Best Picture, Best Director)
- Mark Taylor for No Time to Die (Best Sound)
- Nadia Stacey for Cruella (Best Makeup and Hairstyling)
- Naomi Donne for Cruella (Best Makeup and Hairstyling)
- Oliver Tarney for No Time to Die (Best Sound)
- Olivia Colman for The Lost Daughter (Best Actress)
- Paul Massey for No Time To Die (Best Sound)
- Richard Flynn for The Power of the Dog (Best Sound)
- Simon Chase for Belfast (Best Sound)
- Simon Hayes for No Time to Die (Best Sound)
- Tanya Seghatchian for The Power of the Dog (Best Picture)
- Affairs of the Art (Best Animated Short Film)
- Robin Robin (Best Animated Short Film)

=== Golden Globe Awards ===
The 79th Golden Globe Awards were held on 9 January 2022.

British winners:

- Belfast (Best Screenplay)
- The Power of the Dog (Best Motion Picture – Drama, Best Supporting Actor, Best Director)
- No Time to Die (Best Original Song)
- Kenneth Branagh (Best Screenplay for Belfast)
- Andrew Garfield (Best Performance in a Motion Picture – Musical or Comedy – Actor for Tick, Tick... Boom!)

British nominees:

- Belfast (Best Motion Picture – Drama, Best Supporting Actor, Best Supporting Actress, Best Director, Best Original Song)
- Cyrano (Best Motion Picture – Musical or Comedy, Best Performance in a Motion Picture – Musical or Comedy – Actor)
- Flee (Best Animated Feature)
- Passing (Best Supporting Actress)
- The Power of the Dog (Best Performance in a Motion Picture – Drama – Actor, Best Supporting Actress, Best Screenplay, Best Original Score)
- Spencer (Best Performance in a Motion Picture – Drama – Actress)
- Benedict Cumberbatch (Best Performance in a Motion Picture – Drama – Actor for The Power of the Dog)
- Jamie Hartman (Best Original Song for Respect)
- Jonny Greenwood (Best Original Score for The Power of the Dog)
- Kenneth Branagh (Best Motion Picture – Drama, Best Director for Belfast)
- Olivia Colman (Best Performance in a Motion Picture – Drama – Actress for The Lost Daughter)

== See also ==
- Lists of British films
- 2022 in film
- 2022 in British music
- 2022 in British radio
- 2022 in British television
- 2022 in the United Kingdom
- List of British films of 2021
- List of British films of 2023
