= Sandra Laing =

South African woman (born 1955)

- Born: 26 November 1955 (age 70); Piet Retief, South Africa
- Known for: Skin
- Parent(s): Sannie Laing; Abraham Laing
- Relatives: Adriaan Laing (brother); Leon Laing (brother)

Sandra Laing (born 26 November 1955) is a South African woman who was classified as Coloured by authorities under the apartheid system, due to her skin colour and hair type, although she was officially listed as the child of at least three generations of ancestors who had been regarded as white. At the age of 10, she was expelled from her all-white school, and the authorities' decisions based on her physical appearance disrupted her family and adult life.

Laing was the subject of the 2008 biographical dramatic film Skin, directed by Anthony Fabian, which won numerous awards. In addition, she is the subject of the documentaries In Search of Sandra Laing (1977), directed by Anthony Thomas for the BBC, which was banned by the apartheid government of the time, Sandra Laing: A Spiritual Journey (2000), and Skin Deep: The Story of Sandra Laing (2009).

== Early life ==
Susanna Magrietha "Sandra" Laing was born in 1955 to Susanna Margaretha "Sannie" (née Roux) (1920–2001) and Abraham Laing (1916–1988), Afrikaners in Piet Retief, a small conservative town in South Africa under the apartheid system, when laws governed officially established social castes of racial classification. Her paternal grandparents were Alfred Laing (1874–1962) of Memel, Germany (now Klaipėda, Lithuania) and Hester Sophia Goosen (1877–1949); her maternal grandparents were Adriaan Roux (1876–1967) and Susanna Magrietha Veldman (1886–1967), after whom Sandra was named. She had darker skin and more kinky hair than other members of her family, which seemed to become more obvious as she grew older. Her parents, grandparents, and great-grandparents were all white, but Sandra displayed the physiognomy of Black ancestors from earlier generations, perhaps from the 18th century or more recent. Her family treated her as white, the same as their sons Adriaan and Leon, and together they all attended the Dutch Reformed Church.

When Laing was 10 years old and at an all-white boarding school, the school authorities expelled her because of complaints from the parents of other students, based on her skin colour and hair type. They believed she was "Coloured", a term for mixed-race people. She was expelled and escorted home by two police officers.

Sandra's parents fought several legal battles to have her classified as white, based on her documented ancestry through them. Her father underwent a blood-typing test for paternity in 1966 and 1967, as DNA tests were not yet available. The results were compatible with his being her biological father. Although such tests are extremely imprecise due to the small amount of blood types that most people can have, and though the tests could not prove that he was her father, at least they did not disprove it.

== Later years ==
After the publicity, Laing found herself shunned by the white community, although she was re-classified as white again in 1966 when the law was changed to allow a person to be classified as white if both parents are classified as white. She attended a Coloured boarding school away from her family and became immersed in the non-white world. Her only friends were the children of black employees. At the age of 16, Laing eloped to Eswatini with Petrus Zwane, a black South African who spoke Zulu. She was jailed for three months for illegal border-crossing. Her father threatened to kill her for the marriage and broke off contact with her. They never met again.

Although she and her husband had two children, who were classified as "Coloured", she was threatened with losing them unless she also was classified as "Coloured", as a white parent could not raise Coloured children. At the age of 26, she arranged for the change in race classification officially, although her father had refused permission earlier. Except for secret trips to see her mother when her father was out of the house, Laing was estranged from her family and struggled to survive economically. When her parents moved away from Piet Retief, the clandestine visits were no longer possible. Laing lost contact with her family completely.

Laing and her husband separated due to the pressures they were under, and she put their children into government care for a period. Years later she married again, to Johannes Motloung, a Sotho-speaking man. They had three children together and she was able to reclaim her first two; all are now grown and with families of their own. Trying to reconcile with her family in the 1980s, Laing learned that her father had died and her mother Sannie refused to see her.

In 2000 the Johannesburg Times tracked down Laing to learn about her years since the end of apartheid. The newspaper helped Laing find her mother, who was in a nursing home by that time. Sandra and Sannie reconciled and shared time together before Sannie's death in 2001.

The publicity helped Laing, her husband and family gain new housing; they now live in Leachville, new estates east of Johannesburg. In 2009, it was reported that Laing's brothers still refused to see her. She has said in interviews with The Guardian and Little White Lies that she continued to hope they would some day have a change of heart.

== Representation in other media ==
Documentary films have been made about Laing:

- In Search of Sandra Laing (1977), BBC, directed by Anthony Thomas (released during the apartheid era, this film was banned from distribution in South Africa)
- Sandra Laing: A Spiritual Journey (2000)
- Skin Deep: The Story of Sandra Laing (2009)

and a dramatic film:

- Skin (2008) based on Laing's life story, directed by Anthony Fabian and starring Sam Neill, Alice Krige, and Sophie Okonedo.

based on the book:

- When She Was White: The True Story of a Family Divided by Race by Judith Stone

== See also ==
- Atavism
- The Blond Angel Case
- Solomon Perel
- Torna atrás
