= Racism: A History =

Television series exploring the impact of racism on a global scale

- Genre: Documentary
- Directed by: Paul Tickell
- Narrated by: Sophie Okonedo
- Country of origin: United Kingdom
- Original language: English
- No. of series: 1
- No. of episodes: 3

Production
- Executive producer: David Okuefuna

Original release
- Network: BBC Four
- Release: 22 March – 4 April 2007

Racism: A History is a three-part British documentary series originally broadcast on BBC Four in March 2007.

== Episodes ==
No.	Title	Directed and produced by	Original release date
1	"The Colour of Money"	Paul Tickell	22 March 2007
In its first episode the series begins by assessing the implications of the relationship between Europe, Africa and the Americas in the 15th century. It considers how racist ideas and practices developed in key religious and secular institutions, and how they showed up in writings by European philosophers Aristotle and Immanuel Kant.
2	"Fatal Impact"	David Olusoga	28 March 2007
Examines the idea of scientific racism, an ideology invented during the 19th century that drew on now discredited practices such as phrenology and provided an ideological justification for racism and slavery. The episode shows how these theories ultimately led to eugenics and Nazi racial policies of the master race.
3	"A Savage Legacy"	Tim Robinson	4 April 2007
Examines the impact of racism in the 20th century. By 1900 European colonial expansion had reached deep into the heart of Africa. Under the rule of King Leopold II, the Belgian Congo was turned into a vast rubber plantation. Men, women and children who failed to gather their latex quotas would have their limbs dismembered. The country became the scene of one of the century's greatest racial genocides, as an estimated 10 million Africans perished under colonial rule.
