= The Lost Girls (film) =

2022 British film by Livia De Paolis

- Poster
- Directed by: Livia De Paolis
- Written by: Livia De Paolis
- Based on: The Lost Girls by Laurie Fox
- Produced by: Chris Curling; Meta Valentic; Sam Tipper-Hale; Peter Touche; Livia De Paolis
- Starring: Livia De Paolis; Louis Partridge; Emily Carey; Ella-Rae Smith; Joely Richardson; Iain Glen; Vanessa Redgrave
- Cinematography: Anna Patarakina
- Edited by: Patricia Rommel
- Music by: Marc Canham
- Production companies: Ingenious Media; LipSync Post
- Distributed by: Myriad Pictures
- Release date: 17 June 2022
- Language: English

The Lost Girls is a 2022 British fantasy film written and directed by Livia De Paolis, who also acts in the leading role, based on the 2003 novel of the same name by Laurie Fox. Inspired by Peter Pan and set a few generations after the events of J.M. Barrie's original novel, it explores the consequences of Peter Pan's promise to continue returning to the Darlings.

The film was released in cinemas and to streaming platforms on 17 June 2022.

== Plot ==
Wendy Braverman is the granddaughter of Wendy Darling. As a child, Wendy is told stories about Neverland by Nana Wendy, who also tells her that Peter Pan will one day come for her and that she will be enchanted by him. Wendy is homeschooled by her father, who fears losing her as he did his wife, Jane, who is missing.

One night when Wendy is a teenager, she's visited by Peter Pan and falls in love with him. He takes her to Neverland and makes her promise not to grow up. Wendy has an encounter with Captain Hook, who tries to kiss her, and has a vision of her mother, Jane. After returning home, Wendy waits for Peter to come for her again, but years pass and he doesn't. At Wendy's behest, her father brings her to visit Nana Wendy, who tells Wendy that she will fall in love with another boy, but it won't be enough.

Wendy grows up and meets Adam, and the pair eventually get married, though Wendy continues to think about Peter and has visions of Hook. When Wendy is heavily pregnant, she sees Peter again and asks where her mother is. Peter tells her that he doesn't know, but that Jane was in love with him, which disturbs Wendy.

Wendy and Adam have a daughter, Berry. Wendy resents Berry for taking time away from her creative outputs, while Berry is uninterested in Wendy's stories and is disdainful of Wendy's belief in Neverland. Wendy and Berry visit Nana Wendy, who tells Berry that Peter Pan will come for her soon. One night Peter arrives for Berry, who blames Peter for everything wrong with their family, but is ready to go with him to get away. Wendy wakes up and finds that Berry fallen outside her bedroom window. Wendy and Adam take Berry to the hospital.

Wendy is kidnapped by Hook, who shows her that Jane and Peter had a sexual relationship. Wendy has a final encounter with Peter to tell him she grew up a long time ago, and Peter disappears. Berry wakes at the hospital and tells Wendy that she did manage to fly, but failed partway. She and Berry reconcile. Not long after, Nana Wendy dies. At the funeral, Wendy sees Jane and confronts her. Jane apologies for abandoning Wendy, and explains that she needed her freedom but made a mistake. Wendy brings Jane home to meet Berry.

== Cast ==
- Livia De Paolis as Wendy, a descendant of the original Wendy Darling and mother of Berry
  - Siobhan Hewlett as older Wendy
  - Emily Carey as Young Wendy
  - Amelia Minto as Little Wendy
- Ella-Rae Smith as Berry
  - Ava Fillery as Little Berry
- Joely Richardson as Jane, mother of Wendy and grandmother of Berry.
  - Tilly Marsan as Teen Jane
- Vanessa Redgrave as Great Nana/Wendy Darling, mother of Jane.
- Julian Ovenden as Clayton
- Parker Sawyers as Adam
- Louis Partridge as Peter Pan
- Iain Glen as Hook

== Production ==
It was announced in September 2019 that Livia De Paolis would adapt Laurie Anne Fox's novel for film.

Emma Thompson, Ellen Burstyn, and Gaia Wise were originally scheduled to appear in the film alongside De Paolis, but they were subsequently replaced by Joely Richardson, Vanessa Redgrave, and Ella-Rae Smith. Other cast members include Julian Ovenden, Parker Sawyers, Emily Carey, Louis Partridge and Iain Glen.

Principal photography took place in England with support from the British Screen Sector Task Forces, wrapping in September 2020.

== Release ==
Myriad Pictures were in charge of international distribution. Altitude bought the UK and Ireland rights to the film. It was released in cinemas and to streaming platforms on 17 June 2022.
