= Emoticon ;) =

- Film poster
- Directed by: Livia De Paolis
- Written by: Sarah Nerboso; Livia De Paolis
- Starring: Michael Cristofer; Livia De Paolis; Diane Guerrero; Miles Chandler; Christine Ebersole; Allie Gallerani; Sydney Morton; Daphne Rubin-Vega; Carol Kane; Sonia Braga
- Distributed by: Indican Pictures
- Release date: May 30, 2014
- Country: United States
- Language: English

Emoticon ;) is a 2014 film directed, co-written and starring Livia De Paolis.

== Plot ==
A woman and her boyfriend's children become guides in each other's relationships.
