= Skin (2008 film) =

2008 film

- Theatrical poster
- Directed by: Anthony Fabian
- Written by: Helen Crawley; Anthony Fabian; Jessie Keyt; Helena Kriel
- Produced by: Anthony Fabian; Genevieve Hofmeyr; Margaret Matheson
- Starring: Sophie Okonedo; Sam Neill; Alice Krige
- Cinematography: Dewald Aukema; Jonathan Partridge
- Edited by: St. John O'Rorke
- Music by: Helene Muddiman
- Distributed by: BBC Films (United Kingdom)
- Release dates: 7 September 2008 (TIFF); 24 July 2009 (United Kingdom)
- Running time: 107 minutes
- Countries: South Africa; United Kingdom
- Language: English

Skin is a 2008 biographical drama film directed by Anthony Fabian. It is based on the book When She Was White: The True Story of a Family Divided by Race by Judith Stone, and the life of Sandra Laing, a South African woman born to white parents, who was classified as "Coloured" under the apartheid system, presumably due to a genetic case of atavism.

Skin had its world premiere at the Toronto International Film Festival on 7 September 2008, and was released in the United Kingdom on 24 July 2009.

== Plot ==
In 1965, 10-year-old Sandra Laing lives with her parents, Abraham and Sannie, who are Afrikaners. They are shopkeepers in a remote area of the Eastern Transvaal and, despite Sandra's mixed-race appearance, they lovingly brought her up as their own.

Sandra is sent to a boarding school in the neighbouring town of Piet Retief, where her brother Leon is also studying, but parents of other students and teachers complain that she does not belong there. She is examined by State officials, reclassified as coloured, and expelled from the school following a severe beating by one of the teachers. Sandra's parents are shocked, but Abraham fights through the courts to have the classification reversed. The story becomes an international scandal and media pressure forces the law to change so that Sandra is classified as officially white.

At age 17, Sandra realizes she is never going to be accepted by the white community. She falls in love with Petrus, a young black man and the local vegetable seller, and begins an illicit love affair. After Abraham threatens to shoot Petrus and disown Sandra, Sannie is torn between her husband's rage and her daughter's predicament. Sandra elopes with Petrus to Eswatini, but Abraham alerts the police and has them arrested and put in prison for the illegal border crossing. Sandra is released by the local magistrate to return home with her parents, but she decides to return to Petrus, as she is pregnant with his child. Her father disowns her.

Now Sandra must live her life as a coloured woman in South Africa for the first time, restricted to housing with no running water and no sanitation, and struggling on little income. Although she feels more at home in this community, she desperately misses her parents and yearns for a reunion. She and her mother make attempts to communicate but are consistently thwarted by Sandra's father. Late in his life, when he is too sick to act on his own, he reconsiders and asks his wife to take him to visit Sandra. Sandra's mother, angry that his new-found guilt had surfaced only after he had for 10 years stubbornly ignored her own emotional torment and longing for a reunion, refuses his request and says that neither of them deserves Sandra's forgiveness.

Eventually, Sandra's marriage to Petrus deteriorates and he becomes physically abusive. She leaves him, taking their two children with her. Sandra looks for her parents but finds they had since moved from her childhood home. Not knowing where they are, Sandra continues with her life, raising her children by herself.

When the country's apartheid system is dismantled in the early 1990s, there is renewed interest in her story by the media. Sandra's mother sees Sandra interviewed on television and writes to her to tell her of her father's death two years earlier. The letter provides no return address nor any other clue as to Sannie's whereabouts, but receiving it prompts Sandra to renew her search. Eventually, she finds her mother living in a nursing home and the two are happily reunited.

An epilogue tells that Sandra's mother died in 2001, and her two brothers continue to refuse to see her or her family.

== Cast ==
- Sophie Okonedo as Sandra Laing
  - Ella Ramangwane as young Sandra Laing
- Sam Neill as Abraham Laing
- Alice Krige as Sannie Laing
- Tony Kgoroge as Petrus Zwane
- Terri Ann Eckstein as Elsie Laing
- Bongani Masondo as Henry Laing
- Jonathan Pienaar as Van Niekerk
- Hannes Brummer as Leon Laing
- Onida Cowan as Miss Van Uys
- Lauren Das Neves as Elize

== Reception ==
Roger Ebert gave the film four stars. Peter Bradshaw of The Guardian gave the film three out of five stars.

== Awards ==
Skin has won 19 international festival awards, including:

- Santa Barbara International Film Festival (Audience Award),
- Los Angeles Pan African Film Festival (Audience and Jury Awards),
- AFI Dallas International Film Festival (Audience Award),
- Palm Beach International Film Festival (Jury Award, Best Film),
- Rochester High Falls International Film Festival (Audience Award),
- Tri-Continental, South Africa (Audience Award),
- Bordeaux Cinema Science Film Festival (Grand Jury Prize, Best Film),
- Mediterrante Film Festival (Bari), Italy (Best Film),
- Belize International Film Festival (Audience Award),
- Moondance International Film Festival, USA (Best Score, Hélène Muddiman),
- Accolade Award For Excellence (Original Score Hélène Muddiman),
- United Nations Time For Peace Award (Voted by 21 UN Ambassadors),
- Amnesty International Humanitarian Award (Italy),
- Griffon Environmental Award,
- Giffoni Film Festival, Italy,
- Orange Film Prize,
- Ability Media International Awards,
- MAE Moseac Award for Best Independent Film, MAE Moseac Award for Best Actress (Sophie Okonedo),
- Bahamas International Film Festival, Rising Star Award, Sophie Okonedo.

=== Nominations ===
- British Independent Film Awards 2009, Best Actress (Sophie Okonedo)
- NAACP Image Awards 2010 (Outstanding Foreign Film and Best Actress, Sophie Okonedo)
- Black Reel Awards 2010 (Sophie Okonedo, Best Actress)
- Political Film Society, (Best Film)
- Ivor Novello Awards (Best Score), Hélène Muddiman
