= Sophie Okonedo =

English actress and narrator (born 1968)

Sophie Okonedo CBE
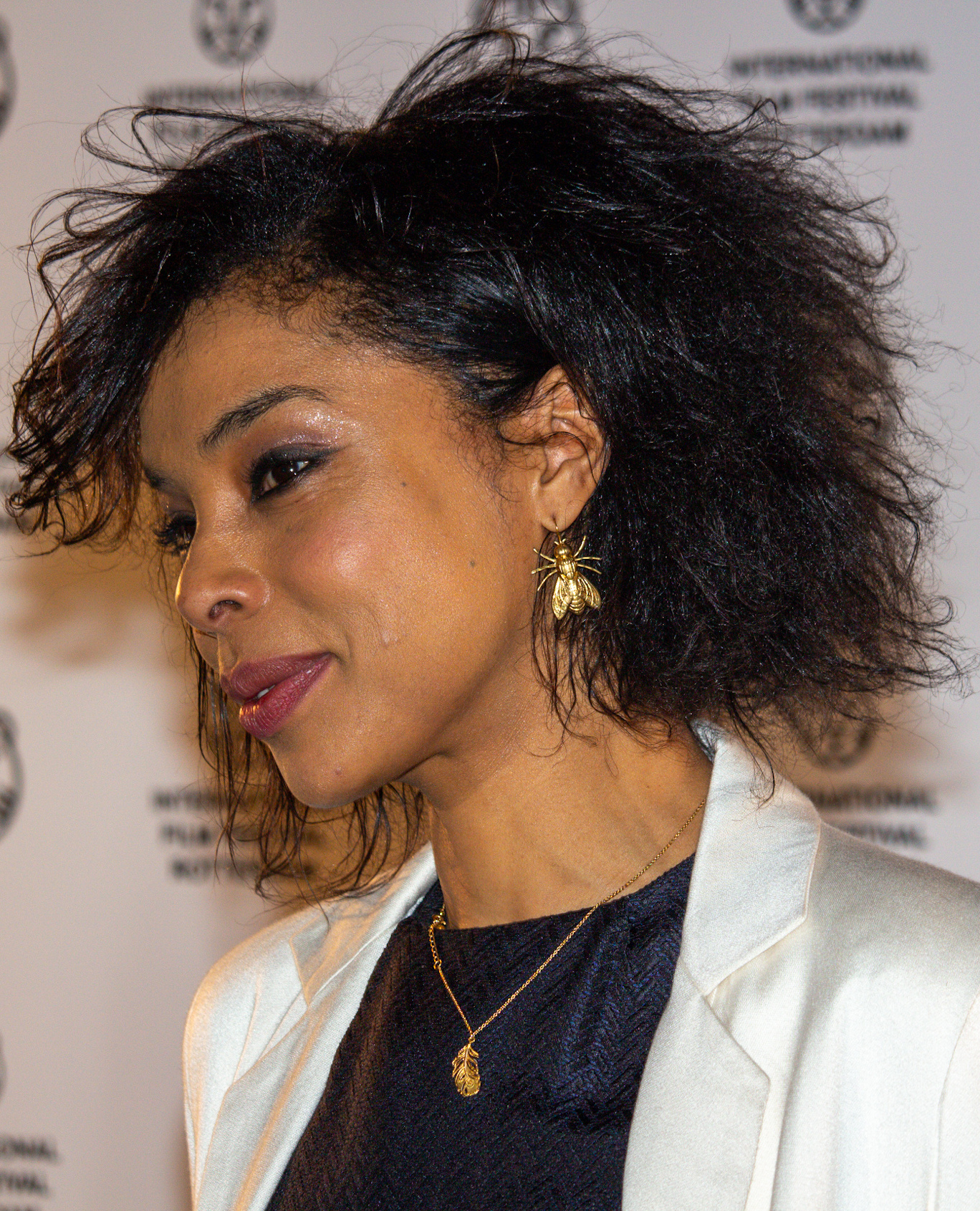
- Okonedo in 2015
- Born: 11 August 1968 (age 58); London, England
- Education: Royal Academy of Dramatic Art
- Occupations: Actress; narrator
- Years active: 1991–present
- Spouse: Jamie Chalmers
- Children: 3

Sophie Okonedo (born 11 August 1968) is a British actress and narrator. The recipient of a Tony Award, she has been nominated for an Academy Award, three BAFTA TV Awards, an Emmy Award, two Laurence Olivier Awards, and a Golden Globe Award. She was appointed Officer of the Order of the British Empire (OBE) in the 2010 Birthday Honours and Commander of the Order of the British Empire (CBE) in 2019 New Year Honours, both for services to drama.

Okonedo made her Broadway debut portraying Ruth Younger in the 2014 revival of Lorraine Hansberry's A Raisin in the Sun for which she won the Tony Award for Best Featured Actress in a Play. She returned to Broadway as Elizabeth Proctor in the 2016 revival of Arthur Miller's The Crucible for which she was nominated for her second Tony Award. She returned to the stage portraying Cleopatra from 2018 to 2019 in the National Theatre production of Antony and Cleopatra for which she was nominated for the Laurence Olivier Award for Best Actress.

She began her film career in the British coming-of-age drama Young Soul Rebels (1991) before appearing in Ace Ventura: When Nature Calls (1995), and Stephen Frears's Dirty Pretty Things (2002). Her breakthrough role was as Tatiana Rusesabagina in Hotel Rwanda (2004) for which she received an Academy Award for Best Supporting Actress nomination. She continued acting in films such as Æon Flux (2005), Martian Child (2007), The Secret Life of Bees (2008), Skin (2008), Christopher Robin (2018), Wild Rose (2018), and Death on the Nile (2022).

For her television work she earned Golden Globe Award nomination for the miniseries Tsunami: The Aftermath (2006), three BAFTA TV Award nominations for Mrs. Mandela (2010), Criminal Justice (2010) and Criminal: UK (2021). She was also nominated for the Primetime Emmy Award for her guest role in Ratched (2020).

== Early life and education ==
Okonedo was born on 11 August 1968 in London, the daughter of Joan (née Allman), a Jewish Pilates teacher who was born in the East End of London, and Henry Okonedo (1939–2009), a British Nigerian who worked for the government. Okonedo's maternal grandparents, who spoke Yiddish, were from families of Russian-Jewish and Polish-Jewish origin. Okonedo was raised in her mother's Jewish faith.

Her father left when Okonedo was five years old, returning to Nigeria and starting a new family. Her mother raised her in the Chalkhill Estate, part of the Wembley Park district in the London Borough of Brent. She then trained at the Royal Academy of Dramatic Art.

== Career ==
She has worked in a variety of media including film, television, theatre and audio drama. She performed in Scream of the Shalka, a webcast based on the BBC television series Doctor Who as Alison Cheney, a companion of the Doctor. As well as providing the character's voice, Okonedo's likeness was used for the animation of the character. In 2010, Okonedo portrayed Liz Ten (Queen Elizabeth X) in the BBC TV series Doctor Who episodes "The Beast Below" and again briefly in "The Pandorica Opens".

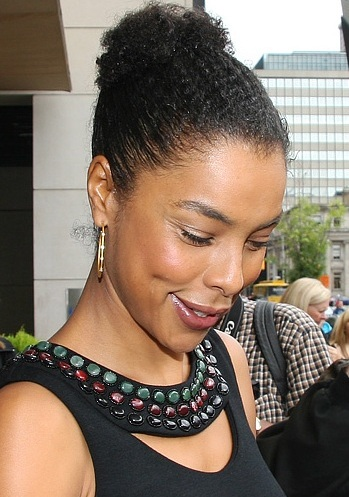
Okonedo in 2008

Okonedo played the role of Jenny in Danny Brocklehurst's BAFTA TV Award nominated episode of Paul Abbott's series Clocking Off. She also played the role of Tulip Jones in the film Stormbreaker (2006) and Nancy in the television adaptation of Oliver Twist (2007). She is also known for playing the role of the Wachati Princess in Ace Ventura: When Nature Calls (1995). In October 2017, Michael Caton-Jones stated that, in 1998, he had chosen Okonedo to star in B. Monkey. However, the film's producer, Harvey Weinstein, banned this because the actress did not meet his personal sexual preference.

She was nominated for an Academy Award in the category of Best Supporting Actress for her role as Tatiana Rusesabagina in Hotel Rwanda (2004) and nominated for a Golden Globe Award for a Lead Actress in a Miniseries for her work in Tsunami: The Aftermath (2006). She played alongside Queen Latifah, Jennifer Hudson, Alicia Keys and Dakota Fanning as May Boatwright, a woman who struggles with depression, in the film The Secret Life of Bees (2008); starred as Sandra Laing in Skin (2009) opposite to Sam Neill and Alice Krige; and portrayed Winnie Mandela in the BBC drama Mrs. Mandela broadcast in January 2010.

In 2014 she appeared on Broadway as Ruth Younger in the revival of A Raisin in the Sun. She won the Tony Award, Best Performance by an Actress in a Featured Role in a Play for this role, beating out co-star and fellow nominee Anika Noni Rose. In 2016, Okonedo returned to Broadway in Ivo van Hove's production of Arthur Miller's The Crucible at the Walter Kerr Theatre as Elizabeth Proctor opposite Bill Camp, Tavi Gevinson, Jason Butler Harner, Ciarán Hinds, Jim Norton, Saoirse Ronan, Thomas Jay Ryan and Ben Whishaw. Also in 2016, Okonedo appeared as Queen Margaret in the second season of the BBC's The Hollow Crown, an adaptation of the Shakespearean plays Henry VI, Part I, II, III and Richard III. She performed in the role of Stevie in the 2017 West End revival of the existentialist play The Goat, or Who Is Sylvia?, by Edward Albee. Directed by Ian Rickson and also starring Damian Lewis as Martin, the production's first preview was on 24 March 2017, opening night on 5 April 2017, and final performance on 24 June 2017, at the Theatre Royal Haymarket.

In May 2013, Okonedo played the role of Hunter in a BBC radio production of Neil Gaiman's Neverwhere, adapted by Dirk Maggs. She portrayed Siuan Sanche in the television series The Wheel of Time from 2021 to 2025. In 2024 she was nominated for an Olivier Award for Best Actress for playing the title role in Medea at the @sohoplace.

== Personal life ==
Okonedo has one daughter, from a relationship she had with Irish film editor Eoin Martin, and lives in Muswell Hill, London. On her heritage, Okonedo has said, "I feel as proud to be Jewish as I feel to be Black" and calls her daughter an "Irish, Nigerian Jew". As of 2023, Okonedo is married to Jamie Chalmers, a builder, and is the stepmother of his two children.

== Honours ==
Okonedo was appointed Officer of the Order of the British Empire (OBE) in the 2010 Birthday Honours and Commander of the Order of the British Empire (CBE) in the 2019 New Year Honours, both for services to drama.

In December 2024, Okonedo received the Richard Harris Award at the British Independent Film Awards (BIFAs).

== Filmography ==
=== Film ===
Year	Title	Role	Notes
1991	Young Soul Rebels	Tracy	
1991	Miss Queencake	(unknown)	Short film
1995	Ace Ventura: When Nature Calls	The Wachati Princess	
1995	The Accidental Conspiracy	Baked Bean Woman	Short film
1997	The Jackal	Jamaican Girl	
1999	This Year's Love	Denise	
1999	Mad Cows	Rosy	
2000	Peaches	Pippa	
2001	Once Seen	(unknown)	Short film
2002	Dirty Pretty Things	Juliette	
2003	Cross My Heart	Marsee	
2004	Hotel Rwanda	Tatiana Rusesabagina	
2005	Æon Flux	Sithandra	
2006	Stormbreaker	Mrs. Jones	
2006	Scenes of a Sexual Nature	Anna	
2007	Martian Child	Sophie	
2008	The Secret Life of Bees	May Boatwright	
2008	Skin	Sandra Laing	
2013	After Earth	Faia Raige	
2014	War Book	Philippa	
2018	Christopher Robin	Kanga (voice)	
2018	Wild Rose	Susannah	
2019	Hellboy	Lady Hatton	
2021	Charlotte	Ottilie Moore (voice)	
2021	Laika	(unknown)	Short film
2022	Death on the Nile	Salome Otterbourne	
2022	Catherine Called Birdy	Ethelfritha Rose Splinter of Devon	
2022	Raymond & Ray	Kiera	
2023	Heart of Stone	Nomad	
2023	Janet Planet	Regina	
2024	10 Lives	Grace (voice)	
2026	Mouse	Helen Bell	
2026	Clarissa	Clarissa Dalloway	
2027	The Great Beyond	TBA	Post-production

=== Television ===
==== Acting ====
Year	Title	Role	Notes
1991	Spatz	Kim	Episode: "Talent Contest"
1991	Casualty	Gina Russell	Episode: "Judgement Day"
1992	Screen Two	Melanie	Episode: "Maria's Child"
1993	Age of Treason	Niobe	Television film
1994	The Bill	Adele Percy	Episode: "Darkness Before Dawn"
1995	The Governor	Moira Levitt	6 episodes
1995	Go Now	Paula	Television film
1996	Murder Most Horrid	Rachel	Episode: "Dead on Time"
1996	Deep Secrets	Honey	Television film
1996–1997	Staying Alive	Kelly Booth	12 episodes
2000	In Defence	Bernie Kramer	4 episodes
2000	Never Never	Jo Weller	2-part drama
2001	Table 12	Karen	Episode: "Opera Lover"
2001	Sweet Revenge	Ellen	2-part drama
2002	Clocking Off	Jenny Wood	5 episodes
2002	Dead Casual	Donna	Television film
2002	VBirds	Bling (voice)	6 episodes
2003	The Inspector Lynley Mysteries	Eve Bowen	Episode: “In the Presence of the Enemy”
2003	Spooks	Amanda Roke	Episode: "Blood & Money" (uncredited role)
2003	Alibi	Marcey Burgess	Television film
2003	Doctor Who: Scream of the Shalka	Alison Cheney (voice)	Miniseries; 6 episodes
2004	Whose Baby?	Karen Jenkins	Television films
2005	Born with Two Mothers	Lucretia Bridges	Television films
2006	The True Voice of Rape	(unknown)	Television films
2006	Tsunami: The Aftermath	Susie Carter	Miniseries; 2 episodes
2007	Celebration	Sonia	Television film
2007	Oliver Twist	Nancy	Miniseries; 5 episodes
2007	Jackanory Junior	Herself - Storyteller	Episode: "The Woman Who Won Things"
2009	Father & Son	Connie Turner	Miniseries; 4 episodes
2009	Criminal Justice	Jackie Woolf	5 episodes
2010	Mrs. Mandela	Winnie Mandela	Television film
2010	Doctor Who	Liz Ten	2 episodes: "The Beast Below" & "The Pandorica Opens"
2011	Tinga Tinga Tales	Cheetah (voice)	Episode: "Why Cheetah Has Tears"
2011	The Slap	Aisha	Miniseries; 8 episodes
2012	Sinbad	Razia	Episode: “Queen of the Water-Thieves”
2013	Mayday	Fiona Hill	Miniseries; 5 episodes
2013	The Escape Artist	Margaret 'Maggie' Gardner	Miniseries; 3 episodes
2014	Wall Street	Bryce	Television film
2015	The Slap	Aisha	Miniseries; 7 episodes (U.S. adaptation of Australian series)
2016	Undercover	Maya Cobbina	Miniseries; 6 episodes
2016	The Hollow Crown: The Wars of the Roses	Margaret, Queen Consort of England	3 episodes
2018	Wanderlust	Angela Bowden	4 episodes
2019	Chimerica	Tessa Kendrick	4 episodes
2019–2020	Flack	Caroline	11 episodes
2020	Criminal: UK	Julia Bryce	Episode: "Julia"
2020	Ratched	Charlotte Wells	3 episodes
2020	His Dark Materials	Xaphania (voice)	4 episodes
2021	Modern Love	Elizabeth Cannon	Episode: “Second Embrace, with Hearts and Eyes Open”
2021	Britannia	Hemple	8 episodes
2021–2025	The Wheel of Time	Siuan Sanche	7 episodes
2022	Inside No. 9	Katrina	Episode: "Nine Lives Kat"
2022–2023	Slow Horses	Ingrid Tearney	7 episodes
2025	The Scarecrows' Wedding	Narrator	Television film

==== Narration ====
In addition to her acting work, Okonedo has provided voice-overs for numerous TV documentaries, including:

- Stan Collymore: Confessions of a Premiership Footballer (2004)
- Blitz: London's Firestorm (2005)
- Racism: A History (miniseries; 3 episodes; 2007)
- Dispatches (3 episodes; 2008, 2009 & 2015)
- Turin Shroud: New Evidence (2009)
- Extraordinary Women (2 episodes; 2011)
- Serious Explorers: Livingstone (2011)
- Welcome to the World (2012)
- 28UP South Africa (2013)
- The Stranger on the Bridge (2015)
- The Destruction of Memory (2016)
- Ebola: The Doctors' Story (2016)
- Thailand: Earth's Tropical Paradise (miniseries; 3 episodes; 2017)
- Concorde: A Supersonic Story (2017)
- Earth's Natural Wonders (3 episodes; 2018)
- Grenfell: The First 24 Hours (2018)
- Dreamflight (5 episodes; 2020)
- Alien Worlds (4 episodes; 2020)
- Frontline (1 episode; 2021)
- Explained (1 episode; 2021)
- The Conqueror: Hollywood Fallout (2023)
- Flight of the Swans (2023)
- Renaissance: The Blood and the Beauty (3 episodes; 2024)
- Civilisations: Rise and Fall (4 episodes; 2025)

=== Video games ===
Year	Title	Role (voice)	Notes
2020	Dreams	Dream Queen	

== Theatre ==
Year	Title	Playwright	Role	Venue
2011	Haunted Child	Joe Penhall	Julie	Royal Court (London, UK)
2014	A Raisin in the Sun	Lorraine Hansberry	Ruth	Ethel Barrymore Theater, (New York City)
2016	The Crucible	Arthur Miller	Elizabeth Proctor	Walter Kerr Theater (New York City)
2017	The Goat, or Who Is Sylvia?	Edward Albee	Stevie Gray	Theatre Royal Haymarket (London, UK)
2018	Antony and Cleopatra	William Shakespeare	Cleopatra	Royal National Theatre (London, UK)
2023	Medea	Euripides	Medea	@sohoplace (London, UK)

== Awards and nominations ==
Film and Television Awards
Award	Year	Category	Project	Result	Ref.
Academy Awards	2005	Best Supporting Actress	Hotel Rwanda	Nominated	
BAFTA TV Awards	2010	Best Leading Actress	Mrs. Mandela	Nominated	
BAFTA TV Awards	2010	Best Supporting Actress	Criminal Justice	Nominated	
BAFTA TV Awards	2021	Best Supporting Actress	Criminal: UK	Nominated	
Black Reel Awards	2005	Best Actress-Drama	Hotel Rwanda	Won	
Black Reel Awards	2008	Best Ensemble	The Secret Life of Bees	Nominated	
Black Reel Awards	2008	Best Supporting Actress	The Secret Life of Bees	Nominated	
Black Reel Awards	2010	Best Actress	Skin	Nominated	
British Independent Film Awards	2003	Best Supporting Actress	Dirty Pretty Things	Nominated	
British Independent Film Awards	2009	Skin	Best Actress	Nominated	
Golden Globe Awards	2007	Best Actress in a Miniseries or TV Movie	Tsunami: The Aftermath	Nominated	
Gotham Awards	2026	Outstanding Lead Performance	Clarissa	Pending	
Hollywood Film Festival	2008	Ensemble Acting of the Year	The Secret Life of Bees	Won	
NAACP Image Awards	2005	Outstanding Supporting Actress in a Motion Picture	Hotel Rwanda	Nominated	
NAACP Image Awards	2007	Outstanding Actress in a Television Movie/Mini-Series	Tsunami: the Aftermath	Won	
NAACP Image Awards	2009	Outstanding Supporting Actress in a Motion Picture	The Secret Life of Bees	Nominated	
NAACP Image Awards	2010	Outstanding Actress in a Motion Picture	Skin	Nominated	
Primetime Emmy Awards	2020	Outstanding Guest Actress in a Drama Series	Ratched	Nominated	
Screen Actors Guild Awards	2004	Outstanding Actress in a Supporting Role	Hotel Rwanda	Nominated	
Screen Actors Guild Awards	2004	Outstanding Ensemble in a Motion Picture	Hotel Rwanda	Nominated	

Theatre Awards

Year	Award	Category	Work	Result	Ref.
2014	Tony Award	Best Performance by a Featured Actress in a Play	A Raisin in the Sun	Won	
2014	Drama Desk Award	Outstanding Featured Actress in a Play	A Raisin in the Sun	Nominated	
2014	Outer Critics Circle Award	Outstanding Featured Actress in a Play	A Raisin in the Sun	Nominated	
2016	Tony Award	Best Performance by a Leading Actress in a Play	The Crucible	Nominated	
2018	Evening Standard Theatre Award	Best Actress	Antony and Cleopatra	Won	
2018	Critics’ Circle Theatre Award	Best Shakespearean Performance	Antony and Cleopatra	Won	
2019	Laurence Olivier Award	Best Actress	Antony and Cleopatra	Nominated	
2023	Evening Standard Theatre Award	Best Actress	Medea	Nominated	
2024	Laurence Olivier Award	Best Actress	Medea	Nominated	

Audio

Year	Award	Category	Work	Result	Ref.
2010	Audie Awards	Audiobook of the Year	Nelson Mandela's Favorite African Folktales	Won	
2010	Audie Awards	Multi-Voiced Performance	Nelson Mandela's Favorite African Folktales	Won	
