= Fading Petals =

2022 film by Bradley Charlton

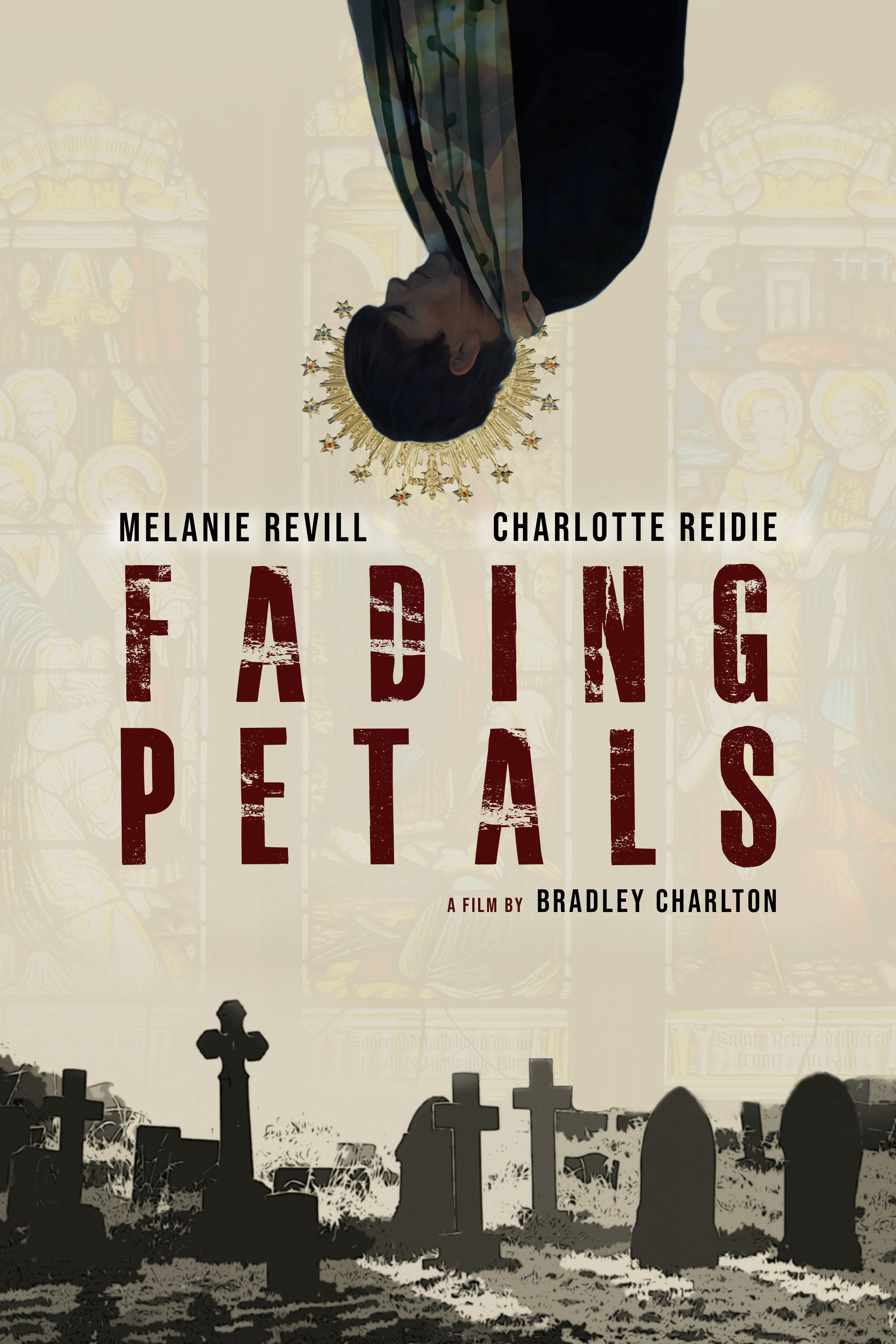
- Film Poster
- Directed by: Bradley Charlton
- Written by: Bradley Charlton
- Produced by: Bradley Charlton; Gabrielle Mastrolonardo
- Starring: Melanie Revill; Charlotte Reidie; Tom Metcalf
- Cinematography: Oliver Rigby
- Music by: William Cunningham
- Distributed by: Crazy Goose Productions
- Release date: 9 March 2022
- Running time: 94 minutes
- Country: United Kingdom
- Language: English

Fading Petals is a 2022 British drama written and directed by Bradley Charlton in his feature directorial debut. The film stars Melanie Revill and Charlotte Reidie. The plot follows a young woman who appears at a sickly older woman's home in order to assist her. Despite their misgivings, the two slowly open up to one another. However, their affinity is short lived when truths are revealed and matters spiral out of control.

The film premiered at the Ultimate Picture Palace in Oxford on 9 March 2022. The film was also released on VOD the same day.

== Plot ==
Fading Petals sees a young woman (Charlotte Reidie) appear at a sickly older woman's home (Melanie Revill) in order to assist her. After a hostile first encounter and despite their misgivings, the two slowly open up to one another and form an unexpected bond. However, their affinity is short lived when harsh words are spoken and buried memories resurface. Matters then spiral out of control as the older woman struggles to accept the absence of the young woman.

== Cast ==
- Melanie Revill as The Older Woman
- Charlotte Reidie as The Younger Woman
- Tom Metcalf as The Young Man
- Gary Raymond as The Father

== Production ==
The film was shot in October 2020, during the covid-19 pandemic. The shoot lasted just eleven days, the total production budget was under £10,000 and the crew consisted of only five people.

== Release ==
The film premiered theatrically in Oxford at the Ultimate Picture Palace on 9 March 2022. It was released on video on demand the same day.

== Reception ==
On review aggregation website Rotten Tomatoes, the film holds an approval rating of 80%. Fading Petals received praised for its central performances with Film Threat saying "when Reidie and Revill are on screen together, the film is truly alive", awarding the film 8/10 stars. The UK Film Review stated "The atmosphere is downbeat and the dramatic revelations, confrontations and powerful performances make this movie an admirable achievement", awarding the film four stars out of five. In his 3 out of 4 star review, Richard Propes wrote "Fading Petals is an indie drama for adults, a patiently paced film with a consistent yet far from monotonous tone". Louisa Moore of Screen Zealots commended the writing saying "Charlton’s script has well-written dialogue and takes on substantial themes like regret and the demands that religion puts on women" and summarized the film as being a "slow but thoughtful piece of female-centered cinema".
