= The Honeymoon (2022 film) =

- Promotional poster
- Directed by: Dean Craig
- Written by: Dean Craig
- Produced by: Maria Bakalova; Guglielmo Marchetti; Piers Tempest
- Starring: Maria Bakalova; Asim Chaudhry; Pico Alexander; Lucas Bravo
- Cinematography: Mike Stern Sterzynski
- Edited by: Stefano Petrucci
- Production companies: Notorious Pictures; Tempo Productions
- Distributed by: Amazon Studios; Lionsgate; Notorious Pictures
- Release date: 16 December 2022 (United States)
- Running time: 97 minutes
- Countries: United Kingdom; Italy
- Language: English

The Honeymoon is a 2022 romantic comedy film written and directed by Dean Craig. It stars Maria Bakalova and Pico Alexander as a newly married couple whose honeymoon in Venice is derailed by the groom's needy best friend Bav (Asim Chaudhry). Lucas Bravo stars as an Italian gangster.

The Honeymoon received a limited release in the United States on 16 December 2022, and was simultaneously available digitally and on-demand. In the United Kingdom and other European countries, it was released on Amazon Prime Video.

== Synopsis ==
Adam whisks his new bride Sarah to Venice, Italy, for a honeymoon. However, he brings best friend Bav along for the ride, who causes one gross-out disaster after another. When charming gangster Giorgio falls for Sarah, he gets rid of Adam and Bav by sending them across the border on a drug-dealing mission.

== Cast ==
- Maria Bakalova as Sarah
- Asim Chaudhry as Bav
- Pico Alexander as Adam
  - Flynn Allen as 18-year-old Adam
- Lucas Bravo as Giorgio
- Marco Valerio Montesano as Rico
- Michele Enrico Montesano as Luigi
- Kai Portman as Lucas
- Myha'la Herrold as Herself

== Production ==
In August 2021, it was announced Maria Bakalova, Pico Alexander, Asim Chaudhry and Lucas Bravo had joined the cast of the film, with Dean Craig directing from a screenplay he wrote. Bakalova also co-produced the film. Principal photography began in Venice and Rome in August 2021, and concluded on 14 October 2021.

== Release ==
In July 2022, it was announced that Amazon Studios had acquired the distribution rights in the United Kingdom and selected European countries, with Grindstone Entertainment Group locking them down for the U.S. and Canada, while Notorious Pictures would distribute the film in Italy and Spain.

The film received a limited release in the United States on 16 December 2022, as well as simultaneous digital and on-demand releases. In the United Kingdom, The Honeymoon was released on 29 December 2022 on Amazon Prime Video. Amazon Studios also handled the film's release in Germany, Belgium, France, Scandinavia and Eastern Europe. Lionsgate released the film on Blu-ray on 24 January 2023.
