= Lucas Bravo =

French actor (born 1988)

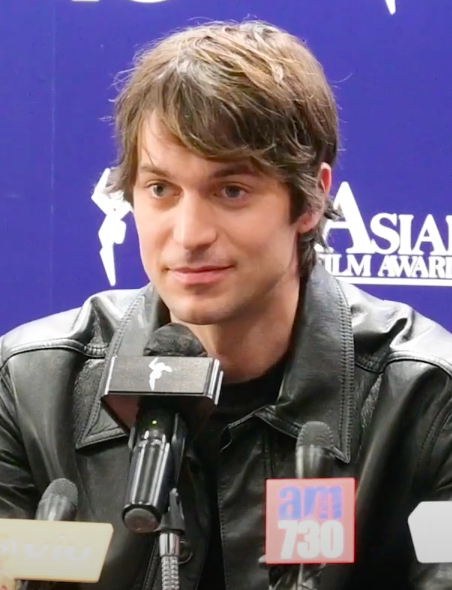
- Bravo in 2023
- Born: Lucas Nicolas Bravo; 26 March 1988 (age 38); Nice, Alpes-Maritimes, France
- Occupation: Actor
- Years active: 2013–present
- Father: Daniel Bravo

Lucas Nicolas Bravo (French: [lykɑ bʁavo]; born 26 March 1988) is a French actor. He is best known for starring in the Netflix romantic comedy series Emily in Paris (2020–present). He is also known for his film roles in the comedy-drama Mrs. Harris Goes to Paris (2022) and the romantic comedies Ticket to Paradise (2022) and The Honeymoon (2022).

== Early life ==
Bravo was born on 26 March 1988 in Nice, Alpes-Maritimes, the son of retired footballer Daniel Bravo —of Spanish origin—, Euro 1984 winner with France, and singer Eva Bravo. He attended the Lycée Pasteur in Neuilly-sur-Seine.

== Career ==
Bravo made his screen debut in Sous le soleil de Saint Tropez (2013). The following year, he appeared as Antoine Mufla in the French comedy-drama film La Crème de la crème, directed by Kim Chapiron. Since 2020, he has been starring opposite Lily Collins in the Netflix romantic comedy series Emily in Paris as Chef Gabriel, Emily's downstairs neighbor and love interest.

Bravo starred in Mrs. Harris Goes to Paris, with Lesley Manville, Isabelle Huppert, and Jason Isaacs, directed by Anthony Fabian, and based on Paul Gallico's novella of the same name. In August 2024, he appeared in Dean Craig's film The Honeymoon, alongside Maria Bakalova. After, in October, he was cast in the romantic comedy Ticket to Paradise starring George Clooney, Julia Roberts and Kaitlyn Dever, and directed by Ol Parker.

== Personal life ==
Bravo and actress Shailene Woodley dated in 2025.

== Filmography ==
=== Film ===
Year	Title	Role	Notes	Ref.
2022	Mrs. Harris Goes to Paris	André Fauvel		
2022	Ticket to Paradise	Paul		
2022	The Honeymoon	Giorgio		
2024	Libre	Bruno Sulak		
2024	The Balconettes	Magnani		
2025	Pose	Peter		

=== Television ===
Year	Title	Role	Notes	Ref.
2013	Sous le soleil de Saint-Tropez	Jeff	2 episodes	
2015	T.O.C	Adrien	1 episode	
2016	Plus belle la vie	Mathieu Grange	1 episode	
2020–present	Emily in Paris	Gabriel	Main role Nominated—2021 MTV Movie & TV Award for Best Kiss (with Lily Collins); Nominated—2022 National Film Award UK for Best Supporting Actor	
2025	The Seduction	Comte de Gercourt	Main role	
