= Mrs. Harris Goes to Paris =

2022 film by Anthony Fabian

- Theatrical release poster
- Directed by: Anthony Fabian
- Screenplay by: Carroll Cartwright; Anthony Fabian; Keith Thompson; Olivia Hetreed
- Based on: Mrs. 'Arris Goes to Paris by Paul Gallico
- Produced by: Anthony Fabian; Xavier Marchand; Guillaume Benski
- Starring: Lesley Manville; Isabelle Huppert; Lambert Wilson; Alba Baptista; Lucas Bravo; Ellen Thomas; Rose Williams; Jason Isaacs
- Cinematography: Felix Wiedemann
- Edited by: Barney Pilling
- Music by: Rael Jones
- Production companies: eOne Features; Superbe Films; Moonriver Content; Hero Squared
- Distributed by: Focus Features (United States); Universal Pictures (international)
- Release dates: 11 July 2022 (Paris); 15 July 2022 (United States); 30 September 2022 (United Kingdom); 6 October 2022 (Hungary); 2 November 2022 (France)
- Running time: 115 minutes
- Countries: United Kingdom; France; Hungary
- Languages: English; French
- Budget: $9–13 million
- Box office: $31.4 million

Mrs. Harris Goes to Paris is a 2022 historical comedy drama film directed and produced by Anthony Fabian, from a screenplay he co-wrote with Carroll Cartwright, Keith Thompson, and Olivia Hetreed. It is the third film adaptation of the 1958 novel Mrs. 'Arris Goes to Paris by Paul Gallico. The film stars Lesley Manville, Isabelle Huppert, Lambert Wilson, Alba Baptista, Lucas Bravo, Ellen Thomas, Rose Williams, and Jason Isaacs.

The film enjoyed strong box office success in the United States arthouse circuit. Manville received a nomination for the Golden Globe Award for Best Actress in a Motion Picture – Comedy or Musical for her performance. The film also won a British Independent Film Award and received a nomination for an Academy Award and a BAFTA Award for Best Costume Design.

== Plot ==
In London in 1957, war widow Mrs Ada Harris works as a cleaning lady. Though she is hardworking and generous, Ada's clients offer her little consideration in return. She has two close friends in Vi and Archie, both her own age.

Ada becomes obsessed with a client's haute couture Dior dress and longs for a similar one of her own. After months of saving, she unexpectedly receives a war widow's pension, and travels to Paris to try to purchase one. Ada stumbles into a showing of Dior's 10th-anniversary collection and is befriended by André, the Dior accountant, and Natasha, a Dior model.

However, Dior director Claudine resents Ada's intrusion into the exclusive world of haute couture and initially declines to accept Ada as a client. Fortunately for Ada, Dior has fallen on hard times and the company eventually agrees to accept a commission for payment in cash.

Ada falls in love with a deep red dress called the Temptation, but a high-profile client spots her interest and spitefully places a competing order. Dior prioritizes the existing client, and Ada has to make do with a different style, in green.

While in Paris for fittings, Ada stays with André and encourages him to express his affection for Natasha, who shares his interest in existential philosophy. Ada herself catches the attention of a Marquis, who shows her kindness, inviting her to spend time with him. She faces disappointment when the Marquis reveals he was interested in Ada because she reminded him of a cleaning lady he had adored as a child.

When Claudine sacks several Dior workers for financial reasons, Ada organises a strike and forces Claudine and Christian Dior to listen to André's ideas to modernise the business. This includes making the shop more accessible to less affluent buyers like Ada. Claudine resigns in disgust, but is convinced by Ada to return, citing her leadership skills. Ada convinces André to reveal his romantic feelings for Natasha, leading to them becoming a couple.

Ada returns to London with her dress, intending to show it off at a community dance. Before doing so, she lends it to her client Pamela, an up-and-coming actress, who wears it to a social event. After Pamela carelessly stands too close to a heater, the dress catches fire and is ruined.

When Ada's friends from Dior read about it in the newspaper, they send her the red dress she had originally wanted, after the buyer failed to pay. She wears the dress to the dance, where she becomes the centre of attention. Seeing her resplendent in her dress, Archie tells Ada that she is a beautiful person, both inside and out. Archie and Ada dance.

== Cast ==
- Lesley Manville as Ada Harris
- Isabelle Huppert as Claudine Colbert
- Lambert Wilson as Marquis de Chassagne
- Alba Baptista as Natasha
- Lucas Bravo as André Fauvel
- Ellen Thomas as Violet "Vi" Butterfield
- Rose Williams as Pamela Penrose
- Jason Isaacs as Archie
- Anna Chancellor as Lady Dant
- Christian McKay as Giles Newcombe
- Freddie Fox as RAF officer
- Guilaine Londez as Madame Avallon
- Philippe Bertin as Christian Dior
- Roxane Duran as Marguerite

== Production ==
In October 2020, it was announced that Lesley Manville, Isabelle Huppert, Jason Isaacs, Lambert Wilson, Alba Baptista and Lucas Bravo had joined the cast of the film, with Anthony Fabian directing and producing the film, from a screenplay he co-wrote with Caroll Cartwright, Keith Thompson and Olivia Hetreed, based upon the novel Mrs. 'Arris Goes to Paris by Paul Gallico. Manville was set as executive producer.

Principal photography began in October 2020. Filming took place over 40 days in Budapest, before production moved to London and Paris.

The film was supported by the National Film Institute Hungary with 279.5M HUF.

== Release ==
In March 2021, Focus Features acquired worldwide distribution rights to Mrs. Harris Goes to Paris for approximately $15 million and distributed the film in the United States, while parent company Universal Pictures distributed it internationally. It was released theatrically in the United States on 15 July 2022, though it was originally scheduled to be released on 6 May. It was released in the United Kingdom on 30 September 2022, in Hungary on 6 October 2022, and in France on 2 November 2022.

It was released on VOD platforms on 2 August 2022, followed by a Blu-ray and DVD release on 6 September 2022.

== Reception ==
=== Box office ===
In the United States, the film made $2 million from 980 theaters in its opening weekend; 44% of its audience were women over the age of 55. It eventually grossed more than $10 million in the United States theatrically. Deadline Hollywood described its box office performance as "strong."

=== Critical response ===
On the review aggregator website Rotten Tomatoes, 94% of 175 critics' reviews are positive, with an average rating of 7.4/10. The website's consensus reads: "Led by a luminous Lesley Manville, Mrs. Harris Goes to Paris is a good old-fashioned story charmingly told." Metacritic, which uses a weighted average, assigned the film a score of 70 out of 100, based on 37 critics, indicating "generally favorable" reviews. Audiences polled by CinemaScore gave the film an average grade of "A" on an A+ to F scale.

=== Accolades ===
Award	Date of ceremony	Category	Recipient(s)	Result	Ref.
AWGIE Awards	17 November 2022	Best Screenplay, Feature Film – Adaptation	Keith Thompson with Anthony Fabian, Carroll Cartwright, and Olivia Hetreed	Won	
British Independent Film Awards	4 December 2022	Best Costume Design	Jenny Beavan	Won	
St. Louis Gateway Film Critics Association	18 December 2022	Best Costume Design	Jenny Beavan	Nominated	
San Diego Film Critics Society	6 January 2023	Best Costumes	Jenny Beavan	Runner-up	
Golden Globe Awards	10 January 2023	Best Actress – Motion Picture Comedy or Musical	Lesley Manville	Nominated	
British Academy Film Awards	19 February 2023	Best Costume Design	Jenny Beavan	Nominated	
Costume Designers Guild Awards	27 February 2023	Excellence in Period Film	Jenny Beavan	Nominated	
Academy Awards	12 March 2023	Best Costume Design	Jenny Beavan	Nominated	
