= Anthony Fabian =

British film producer

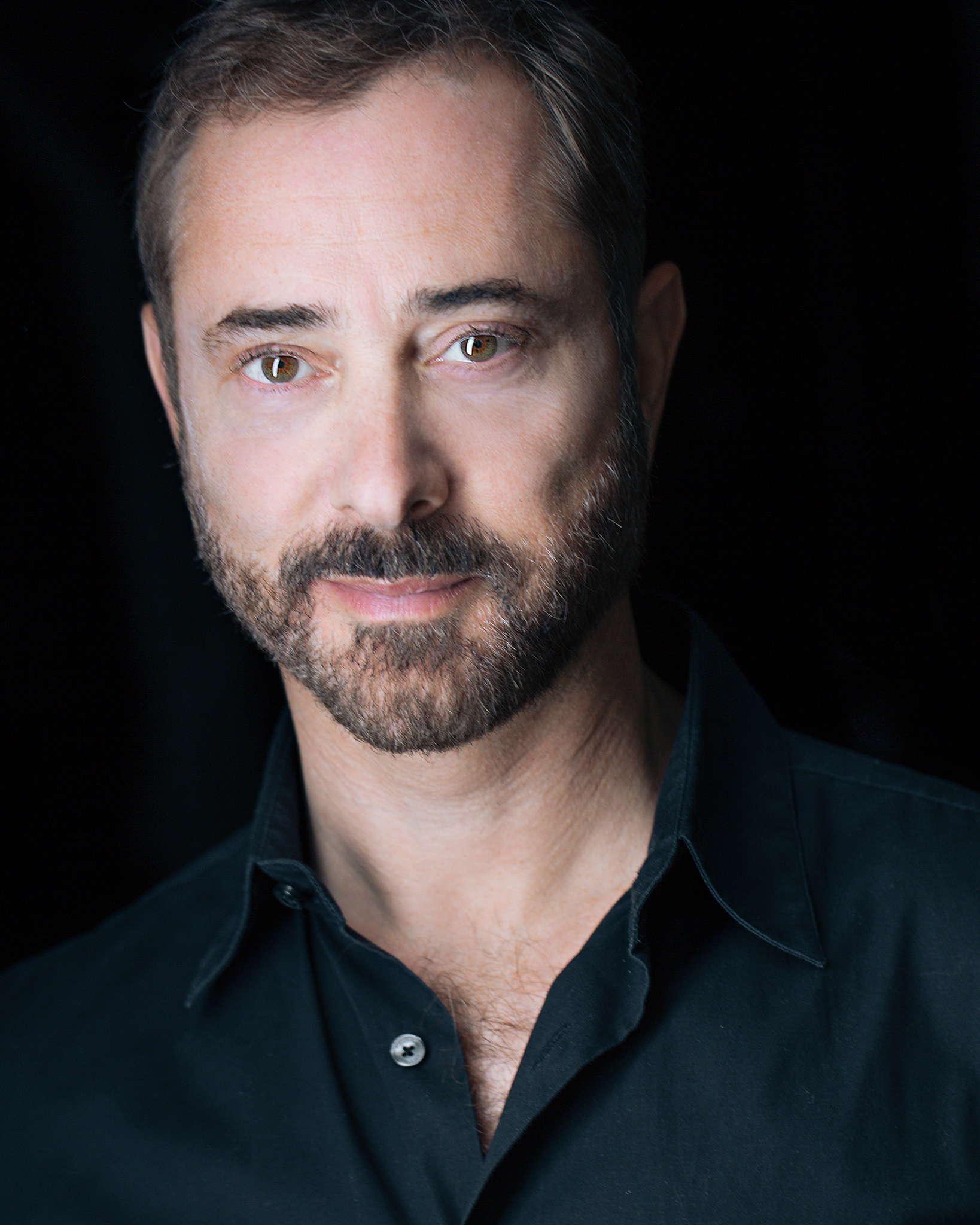

Anthony Fabian is a British producer, writer and director of feature films, shorts, documentaries, and classical music programmes made through his company, Elysian Films. He is the director of Mrs. Harris Goes to Paris starring Lesley Manville and Isabelle Huppert, released in the US by Focus Features in July 2022 and by Universal Pictures in the rest of the world later in the year. His first feature film, Skin, won 22 international awards. His feature documentary, Good Hope, about the past, present and potential future of South Africa, was released in 2020. He has also worked as music supervisor on a number of feature films, including Restoration, GoldenEye, Schubert and Hilary and Jackie.

== Career ==
2020 saw the release of Fabian's feature-length documentary Good Hope, exploring the current socio-political landscape of South Africa through the eyes of the post-apartheid generation. His next feature film, based on Paul Gallico's Mrs. Harris Goes to Paris, went into production in October 2020 and was released by Focus Features in 2022. It stars Lesley Manville, Isabelle Huppert, Jason Isaacs, Lambert Wilson, Anna Chancellor, Lucas Bravo, Alba Baptista, Ellen Thomas and Rose Williams. Fabian, together with Keith Thompson, Carroll Cartwright and Olivia Hetreed, won best feature adaptation for their work on Mrs. Harris Goes to Paris at the 2022 AWGIE Awards. In 2023, Lesley Manville was nominated for a Golden Globe Award as Best Actress in a Comedy or Musical, Jenny Beavan was nominated for a BAFTA and Oscar for Best Costume Design and won the Best Costume Design BIFA for the film.

== Personal life ==
Fabian grew up in Mexico City, Paris, Los Angeles and the UK, before settling in London. Fabian was the civil partner of Christopher Hogwood until shortly before Hogwood died in 2014. He is of Hungarian Jewish origin on his mother's side and also holds Hungarian citizenship.

== Filmography ==
Short film

Year	Title	Director	Writer	Producer
1994	Bach & Variations	Yes	Yes	Yes
1998	Candy	Yes	No	No
2000	Jean	Yes	No	No
2005	Prick	Yes	No	Yes
2007	Scarred	No	No	Yes
2014	Freeze-Frame	Yes	No	No

Feature film

Year	Title	Director	Writer	Producer
2008	Skin	Yes	Yes	Yes
2013	Louder Than Words	Yes	No	No
2022	Mrs. Harris Goes to Paris	Yes	Yes	Yes

Documentary works

Year	Title	Director	Writer	Producer	Notes
2002	Township Opera	Yes	Yes	Yes	
2003	Harmony in Hanoi	Yes	Yes	Yes	
2005	While the Music Lasts	Yes	Yes	Yes	
2009	Embracing the Tiger	Yes	Yes	No	
2012	British Legends of Stage and Screen	Yes	Yes	Yes	8-part docu-series
2020	Good Hope	Yes	Yes	Yes	
