= Livia De Paolis =

Italian-American actress

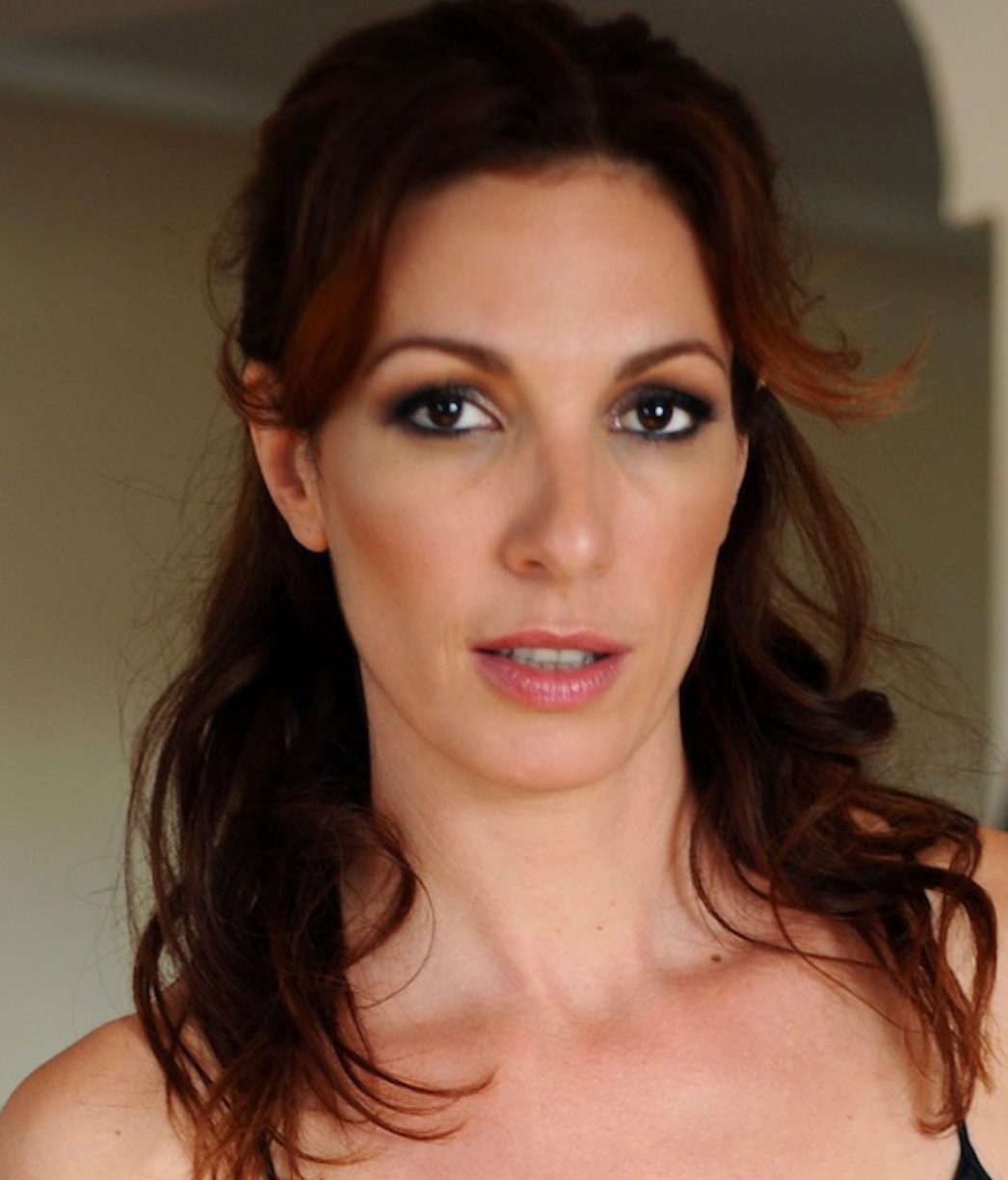
- Born: Rome, Italy
- Citizenship: Italy; United States
- Occupation(s): Actress; Director; Producer; Screenwriter

Livia De Paolis is an Italian-American actress, director, screenwriter and producer. She currently lives in New York City.

== Early life and education ==
De Paolis was born and raised in Rome, Italy. Founded by her grandfather, her family ran De Paolis I.N.C.I.R., the only Studios structure privately owned in the country. In operation from 1941 to 1991, De Paolis I.N.C.I.R. housed the productions of over 2000 films including the works of Federico Fellini, Bernardo Bertolucci, Roberto Rossellini.

She graduated magna cum laude from University 'Sapienza' of Rome, earning a master's degree in philosophy. During her years in University she also studied acting with Francesca De Sapio at the Duse International Centre of Cinema and Theatre. After graduating she moved to New York City and focused her career for several years on contemporary theatre. She also took part in a work and study program at the T. Schreiber Studio, trained with the SITI Company and assisted Richard Foreman on the production of the show ZOMBOID!

== Career ==
De Paolis wrote, directed, produced and starred in the movie Emoticon ;), also starring Michael Cristofer, Carol Kane, Sonia Braga, Christine Ebersole, Daphne Rubin Vega and Diane Guerrero. Emoticon ;) premiered at the Chinese Theater in LA during Dances With Films in 2013 and was the opening night movie at the 2013 Gen Art Film Festival in New York, where it won the Best Cast Collaboration Award. Emoticon ;) was theatrically released by Indiecan Pictures at Cinema Village in NY and at the Laemmle Music Hall in Beverly Hills and it's currently available in DVD and on all the major digital platforms.

Kelly Maxwell of Bust magazine calls De Paolis “an excellent writer” who “clearly understands human relationships.” “De Paolis was able to tackle her debut film with grace and I look forward to seeing where else she goes as a filmmaker.” Neil Genzlinger of The New York Times has recognized how “The new device-aided ways that people have of communicating may indeed turn out to be the defining evolutionary change of our era” and Frank Scheck of THR has lauded the movie's “incisive characterizations and well-drawn smaller moments” as well as De Paolis’ “engaging performance”. Emoticon ;) was also part of the Terra di Siena Film Festival in Italy in 2015 where it was nominated as Best Picture and was awarded the Critics Special Mention by Antonio and Pupi Avati .

De Paolis also wrote, directed, produced and starred in the short film Awestruck, which was picked up by Shorts International for both broadcast and digital distribution in the United States, Europe and South Asia.

In 2020, De Paolis directed the upcoming feature film, The Lost Girls, which she also wrote, produced and starred in alongside Joely Richardson, Vanessa Redgrave, Iain Glen, and Louis Partridge. The film was originally announced during 2019 Toronto Film Festival with Emma Thompson and Ellen Burstyn attached in the roles that have ultimately been played by Joely Richardson and Vanessa Redgrave. The film was released on June 17, 2022 in cinemas and on streaming platforms in the UK and Ireland by Altitude Film Distribution and in the US by Vertical Entertainment.

=== Theater ===
De Paolis originated the title role in John Patrick Shanley's one act play Veronica, which he wrote specifically for her. It featured music and two original songs by Henry Krieger. The play was presented at the Powerhouse Theater at Vassar College during New York Stage and Film Powerhouse Season.

A workshop production of Veronica was presented at the Hudson Theater Guild in Hollywood, Los Angeles. De Paolis played the title role opposite Sam Harris, lead singer of X Ambassadors. Over the years De Paolis has collaborated with some of the most innovative figures in the New York theater community. She has performed numerous times at Richard Foreman's Ontological Hysteric Theater. She played the role of Yvette in the world premiere of Charles Mee's Fire Island with 3-Legged Dog at the 3LD Art and Technology Center. With the same company she also performed as Linda in Losing Something.
