= List of waterfalls in Montana =

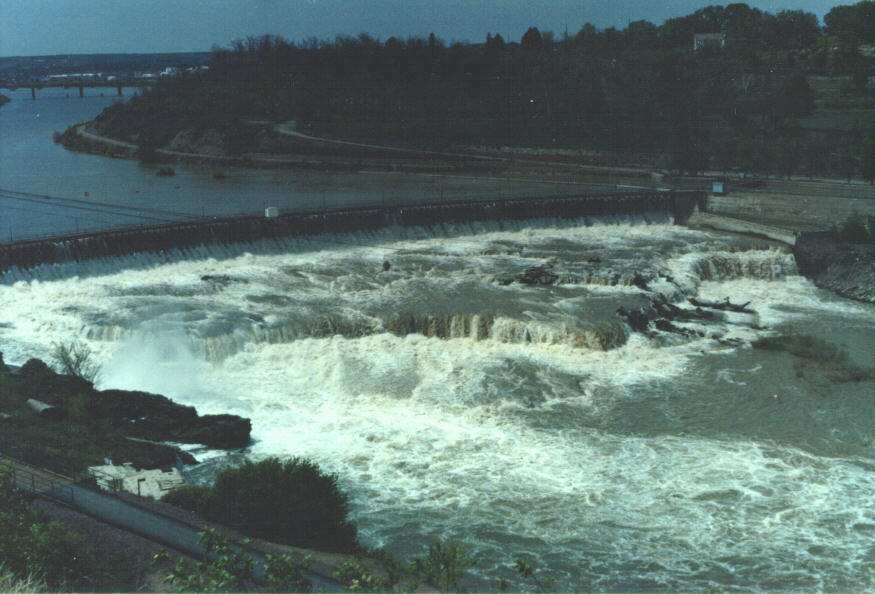
Great Falls of the Missouri

There are at least 120 named waterfalls in Montana. A waterfall is a place where flowing water rapidly drops in elevation as it flows over a steep region or a cliff. Waterfalls are most commonly formed when a river is young.

- Akaiyan Falls, Flathead County, Montana, 48°36′51″N 113°47′05″W, el. 6,985 feet (2,129 m)
- Alpine Falls, Gallatin County, Montana, 45°23′34″N 110°57′11″W, el. 8,802 feet (2,683 m)
- Apex Falls, Gallatin County, Montana, 45°23′50″N 110°57′22″W, el. 8,281 feet (2,524 m)
- Apikuni Falls, Glacier County, Montana, 48°48′51″N 113°38′33″W, el. 5,522 feet (1,683 m)
- Appistoki Falls, Glacier County, Montana, 48°28′55″N 113°21′09″W, el. 5,512 feet (1,680 m)
- Arch Falls, Gallatin County, Montana, 45°25′38″N 110°57′40″W, el. 7,342 feet (2,238 m)
- Atlantic Falls, Glacier County, Montana, 48°34′26″N 113°27′02″W, el. 5,367 feet (1,636 m)
- Atsina Falls, Glacier County, Montana, 48°52′25″N 113°51′02″W, el. 6,247 feet (1,904 m)
- Baring Falls, Glacier County, Montana, 48°40′37″N 113°35′35″W, el. 4,564 feet (1,391 m)
- Barrier Falls, Missoula County, Montana, 47°34′00″N 113°29′43″W, el. 4,459 feet (1,359 m)
- Beaver Chief Falls, Flathead County, Montana, 48°35′38″N 113°45′52″W, el. 5,262 feet (1,604 m)
- Beaver Medicine Falls, Flathead County, Montana, 48°36′06″N 113°47′46″W, el. 5,545 feet (1,690 m)
- Big Falls, Cascade County, Montana, 47°34′12″N 111°07′23″W, el. 3,012 feet (918 m)
- Big Salmon Falls, Missoula County, Montana, 47°30′47″N 113°30′44″W, el. 5,531 feet (1,686 m)
- Bird Woman Falls, Flathead County, Montana, 48°42′29″N 113°44′51″W, el. 5,751 feet (1,753 m)
- Black Eagle Falls, Cascade County, Montana, 47°31′15″N 111°15′43″W, el. 3,278 feet (999 m)
- Boulder Falls, Ravalli County, Montana, 45°51′35″N 114°18′29″W, el. 5,502 feet (1,677 m)
- Buffalo Falls, Cascade County, Montana, 47°21′49″N 111°54′27″W, el. 3,816 feet (1,163 m)
- Calamity Falls, Carbon County, Montana, 45°09′43″N 109°31′13″W, el. 8,182 feet (2,494 m)
- Canyon Falls (Montana), Ravalli County, Montana, 46°14′43″N 114°19′15″W, el. 7,054 feet (2,150 m)
- Cascade Falls, Sanders County, Montana, 47°18′10″N 114°49′35″W, el. 2,943 feet (897 m)
- Cascade Falls, Park County, Montana, 45°28′11″N 110°33′37″W, el. 5,568 feet (1,697 m)
- Castner Falls, Cascade County, Montana, 47°18′17″N 111°29′49″W, el. 3,543 feet (1,080 m)
- Cataract Falls, Lewis and Clark County, Montana, 47°19′19″N 112°36′14″W, el. 5,321 feet (1,622 m)
- Cedar Falls, Madison County, Montana, 45°14′19″N 111°31′02″W, el. 9,311 feet (2,838 m)
- Champagne Falls, Gallatin County, Montana, 45°24′28″N 110°57′30″W, el. 7,808 feet (2,380 m)
- Charlie Falls, Carbon County, Montana, 45°07′20″N 109°43′28″W, el. 8,445 feet (2,574 m)
- Colter Falls (historical), Cascade County, Montana, 47°32′15″N 111°12′53″W, el. 3,251 feet (991 m)
- Crooked Falls, Cascade County, Montana, 47°32′10″N 111°11′47″W, el. 3,136 feet (956 m)
- Crow Creek Falls, Jefferson County, Montana, 46°20′17″N 111°47′27″W, el. 5,636 feet (1,718 m)
- Dawn Mist Falls, Glacier County, Montana, 48°54′31″N 113°43′18″W, el. 4,711 feet (1,436 m)
- Dawson Falls, Glacier County, Montana, 48°25′24″N 113°12′32″W, el. 4,734 feet (1,443 m)
- Deadwood Falls, Glacier County, Montana, 48°40′00″N 113°38′13″W, el. 4,642 feet (1,415 m)
- Dean Falls, Flathead County, Montana, 47°52′39″N 113°12′44″W, el. 4,616 feet (1,407 m)
- Double Falls, Lewis and Clark County, Montana, 47°24′25″N 112°43′26″W, el. 5,298 feet (1,615 m)
- Elizabeth Falls, Lake County, Montana, 47°20′21″N 113°55′43″W, el. 5,919 feet (1,804 m)
- Feather Plume Falls, Glacier County, Montana, 48°45′04″N 113°42′09″W, el. 6,256 feet (1,907 m)
- Feather Woman Falls, Flathead County, Montana, 48°36′42″N 113°46′44″W, el. 7,192 feet (2,192 m)
- Florence Falls, Glacier County, Montana, 48°39′04″N 113°41′33″W, el. 4,980 feet (1,520 m)
- Graves Creek Falls, Sanders County, Montana, 47°43′12″N 115°22′44″W, el. 2,835 feet (864 m)
- Grinnell Falls, Glacier County, Montana, 48°45′45″N 113°43′13″W, el. 5,955 feet (1,815 m)
- Gros Ventre Falls, Glacier County, Montana, 48°55′49″N 113°44′22″W, el. 4,800 feet (1,500 m)
- Grotto Falls, Gallatin County, Montana, 45°26′09″N 110°57′50″W, el. 7,146 feet (2,178 m)
- Hidden Falls, Glacier County, Montana, 48°45′57″N 113°41′44″W, el. 4,977 feet (1,517 m)
- Hole-in-the Wall Falls, Flathead County, Montana, 48°57′43″N 114°04′05″W, el. 6,256 feet (1,907 m)
- Hoodoo Cascade, Gallatin County, Montana, 45°22′59″N 111°14′43″W, el. 6,985 feet (2,129 m)
- Horsetail Falls, Park County, Montana, 45°26′27″N 110°54′59″W, el. 8,389 feet (2,557 m)
- Impasse Falls, Carbon County, Montana, 45°07′04″N 109°44′33″W, el. 9,009 feet (2,746 m)
- Ipasha Falls, Glacier County, Montana, 48°50′55″N 113°48′26″W, el. 6,283 feet (1,915 m)
- Knowles Falls, Park County, Montana, 45°00′42″N 110°35′41″W, el. 5,558 feet (1,694 m)
- Kootenai Falls, Lincoln County, Montana, 48°27′20″N 115°45′48″W, el. 1,972 feet (601 m)
- Lange Falls, Lewis and Clark County, Montana, 47°36′10″N 112°50′06″W, el. 5,020 feet (1,530 m)
- Little North Fork Falls, Lincoln County, Montana, 48°45′36″N 115°22′33″W, el. 3,061 feet (933 m)
- Lost Creek Falls, Mineral County, Montana, 47°06′46″N 115°07′13″W, el. 5,302 feet (1,616 m)
- Lower Falls, Lincoln County, Montana, 48°56′08″N 115°40′54″W, el. 3,123 feet (952 m)
- Martin Falls, Flathead County, Montana, 48°34′01″N 114°41′11″W, el. 3,753 feet (1,144 m)
- McDonald Falls, Flathead County, Montana, 48°38′25″N 113°51′47″W, el. 3,225 feet (983 m)
- Memorial Falls (Montana), Cascade County, Montana, 46°54′55″N 110°41′35″W, el. 6,188 feet (1,886 m)
- Miche Wabun Falls, Glacier County, Montana, 48°58′58″N 113°46′16″W, el. 5,548 feet (1,691 m)
- Mill Falls, Teton County, Montana, 47°51′32″N 112°46′31″W, el. 5,781 feet (1,762 m)
- Mission Falls, Lake County, Montana, 47°20′12″N 113°56′21″W, el. 4,941 feet (1,506 m)
- Mokowanis Cascade, Glacier County, Montana, 48°52′36″N 113°50′28″W, el. 5,676 feet (1,730 m)
- Monture Falls, Powell County, Montana, 47°15′53″N 113°10′33″W, el. 5,449 feet (1,661 m)
- Monument Falls, Flathead County, Montana, 48°39′00″N 113°46′19″W, el. 4,272 feet (1,302 m)
- Morning Eagle Falls, Glacier County, Montana, 48°44′09″N 113°41′50″W, el. 5,709 feet (1,740 m)
- Morrell Falls, Powell County, Montana, 47°18′04″N 113°27′46″W, el. 5,007 feet (1,526 m)
- Mud Creek Falls, Lake County, Montana, 47°36′58″N 114°00′21″W, el. 5,154 feet (1,571 m)
- Needle Falls, Flathead County, Montana, 47°36′42″N 113°12′18″W, el. 5,190 feet (1,580 m)
- North Fork Falls, Lewis and Clark County, Montana, 47°11′39″N 112°53′41″W, el. 5,407 feet (1,648 m)
- Oberlin Falls, Flathead County, Montana, 48°41′59″N 113°43′24″W, el. 6,480 feet (1,980 m)
- Ousel Falls, Gallatin County, Montana, 45°14′21″N 111°20′30″W, el. 6,614 feet (2,016 m)
- Overwhich Falls, Ravalli County, Montana, 45°43′07″N 114°04′38″W, el. 6,529 feet (1,990 m)
- Paiota Falls, Glacier County, Montana, 48°52′19″N 113°50′59″W, el. 6,240 feet (1,900 m)
- Palisade Falls, Gallatin County, Montana, 45°28′18″N 110°56′11″W, el. 7,060 feet (2,150 m)
- Palisades Falls, Gallatin County, Montana, 45°28′15″N 110°55′43″W, el. 7,490 feet (2,280 m)
- Paradise Falls, Lewis and Clark County, Montana, 46°45′06″N 112°27′50″W, el. 5,377 feet (1,639 m)
- Passage Falls, Park County, Montana, 45°14′32″N 110°29′50″W, el. 6,440 feet (1,960 m)
- Piegan Falls, Glacier County, Montana, 48°42′37″N 113°40′38″W, el. 6,962 feet (2,122 m)
- Pinkham Falls, Lincoln County, Montana, 48°50′21″N 115°10′19″W, el. 2,815 feet (858 m)
- Pintler Falls, Beaverhead County, Montana, 45°51′36″N 113°26′44″W, el. 6,417 feet (1,956 m)
- Pioneer Falls, Madison County, Montana, 45°24′54″N 111°24′19″W, el. 6,758 feet (2,060 m)
- Ptarmigan Falls, Glacier County, Montana, 48°49′17″N 113°42′42″W, el. 5,659 feet (1,725 m)
- Rainbow Falls, Glacier County, Montana, 48°56′58″N 113°53′53″W, el. 4,258 feet (1,298 m)
- Rainbow Falls, Cascade County, Montana, 47°32′00″N 111°12′20″W, el. 3,199 feet (975 m)
- Raven Quiver Falls, Glacier County, Montana, 48°51′56″N 113°50′50″W, el. 7,077 feet (2,157 m)
- Redrock Falls, Glacier County, Montana, 48°47′41″N 113°42′39″W, el. 5,125 feet (1,562 m)
- Rock Creek Falls, Powell County, Montana, 46°24′37″N 112°57′45″W, el. 6,053 feet (1,845 m)
- Rockwell Falls, Glacier County, Montana, 48°27′11″N 113°24′13″W, el. 5,466 feet (1,666 m)
- Running Eagle Falls, Glacier County, Montana, 48°29′53″N 113°21′08″W, el. 5,020 feet (1,530 m)
- Sacred Dancing Cascade, Flathead County, Montana, 48°38′32″N 113°51′08″W, el. 3,291 feet (1,003 m)
- Saint Mary Falls, Glacier County, Montana, 48°40′05″N 113°37′02″W, el. 4,560 feet (1,390 m)
- Salamander Falls, Glacier County, Montana, 48°45′20″N 113°44′09″W, el. 6,991 feet (2,131 m)
- Sentinel Falls, Carbon County, Montana, 45°09′24″N 109°31′42″W, el. 8,366 feet (2,550 m)
- Shower Falls, Gallatin County, Montana, 45°23′58″N 110°57′25″W, el. 8,140 feet (2,480 m)
- Siksika Falls, Glacier County, Montana, 48°37′03″N 113°41′16″W, el. 5,285 feet (1,611 m)
- S'il Vous Plait Falls, Gallatin County, Montana, 45°23′38″N 110°57′12″W, el. 8,648 feet (2,636 m)
- Silken Skein Falls, Gallatin County, Montana, 45°25′12″N 110°57′09″W, el. 8,090 feet (2,470 m)
- Skalkaho Falls, Ravalli County, Montana, 46°15′27″N 113°49′35″W, el. 6,227 feet (1,898 m)
- Snowshoe Falls, Missoula County, Montana, 46°40′32″N 114°34′16″W, el. 4,455 feet (1,358 m)
- Specimen Falls, Park County, Montana, 45°03′26″N 110°28′54″W, el. 8,179 feet (2,493 m)
- Star Falls, Ravalli County, Montana, 45°54′43″N 113°35′52″W, el. 6,135 feet (1,870 m)
- Sutton Creek Falls, Lincoln County, Montana, 48°46′13″N 115°15′59″W, el. 3,612 feet (1,101 m)
- Swiftcurrent Falls, Glacier County, Montana, 48°47′59″N 113°39′19″W, el. 4,856 feet (1,480 m)
- Taylor Falls, Madison County, Montana, 45°02′12″N 111°24′27″W, el. 7,674 feet (2,339 m)
- Tenmile Falls, Lincoln County, Montana, 48°37′07″N 115°10′19″W, el. 4,042 feet (1,232 m)
- Terrace Falls, Lake County, Montana, 47°31′12″N 113°56′56″W, el. 6,447 feet (1,965 m)
- Thunderbird Falls, Glacier County, Montana, 48°56′27″N 114°01′58″W, el. 6,663 feet (2,031 m)
- Turner Falls, Lincoln County, Montana, 48°52′08″N 115°34′49″W, el. 3,576 feet (1,090 m)
- Twin Falls, Glacier County, Montana, 48°28′35″N 113°25′36″W, el. 5,321 feet (1,622 m)
- Twin Falls, Gallatin County, Montana, 45°25′49″N 110°58′36″W, el. 8,209 feet (2,502 m)
- Two Medicine Falls, Glacier County, Montana, 48°27′55″N 113°13′17″W, el. 4,757 feet (1,450 m)
- Upper Big Timber Falls, Sweet Grass County, Montana, 46°02′25″N 110°14′52″W, el. 6,690 feet (2,040 m)
- Upper Falls, Lincoln County, Montana, 48°55′53″N 115°43′02″W, el. 3,284 feet (1,001 m)
- Vermilion Falls, Sanders County, Montana, 47°52′46″N 115°21′19″W, el. 3,412 feet (1,040 m)
- Virginia Falls, Glacier County, Montana, 48°39′38″N 113°36′44″W, el. 4,882 feet (1,488 m)
- Whale Creek Falls, Flathead County, Montana, 48°51′04″N 114°36′10″W, el. 4,495 feet (1,370 m)
- White Quiver Falls, Glacier County, Montana, 48°53′10″N 113°48′53″W, el. 4,885 feet (1,489 m)
- Wolf Creek Falls, Fergus County, Montana, 47°32′06″N 109°40′10″W, el. 2,881 feet (878 m)
- Woodbine Falls, Stillwater County, Montana, 45°21′13″N 109°53′08″W, el. 5,814 feet (1,772 m)
- Yaak Falls, Lincoln County, Montana, 48°38′55″N 115°53′06″W, el. 2,438 feet (743 m)

== See also ==
- List of waterfalls
- Rivers of Montana
