= Mount Oberlin =

Mountain in the Lewis Range, Glacier National Park, Montana, United States

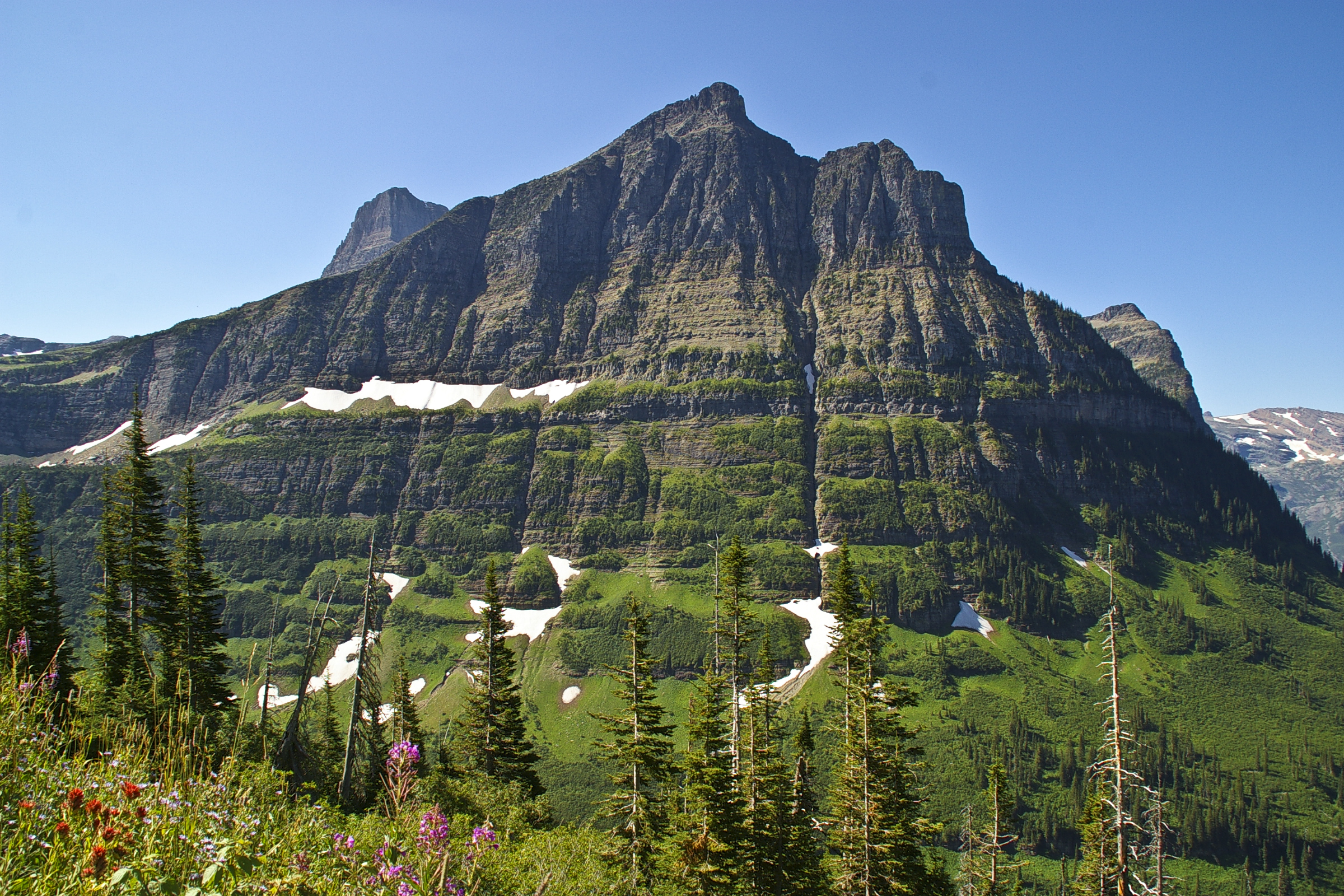
- Northeast aspect

Highest point
- Elevation: 8,184 ft (2,494 m)
- Prominence: 660 ft (200 m)
- Coordinates: 48°42′16″N 113°44′09″W

Geography
- Location within Montana Location within the United States
- Location: Flathead County, Montana, U.S.
- Parent range: Lewis Range
- Topo map(s): USGS Logan Pass, MT

Mount Oberlin (8,184 feet (2,494 m)) is located in the Lewis Range, Glacier National Park in the U.S. state of Montana. Mount Oberlin is just northwest of Logan Pass. Below the summit to the northwest, water and melting snow off Mount Oberlin lead to the 492 feet (150 m) Bird Woman Falls, one of the tallest waterfalls in Glacier National Park.

Dr. Lyman B. Sperry, a member of an 1895 party exploring the Glacier Park region, named the mountain after his employer, Oberlin College.

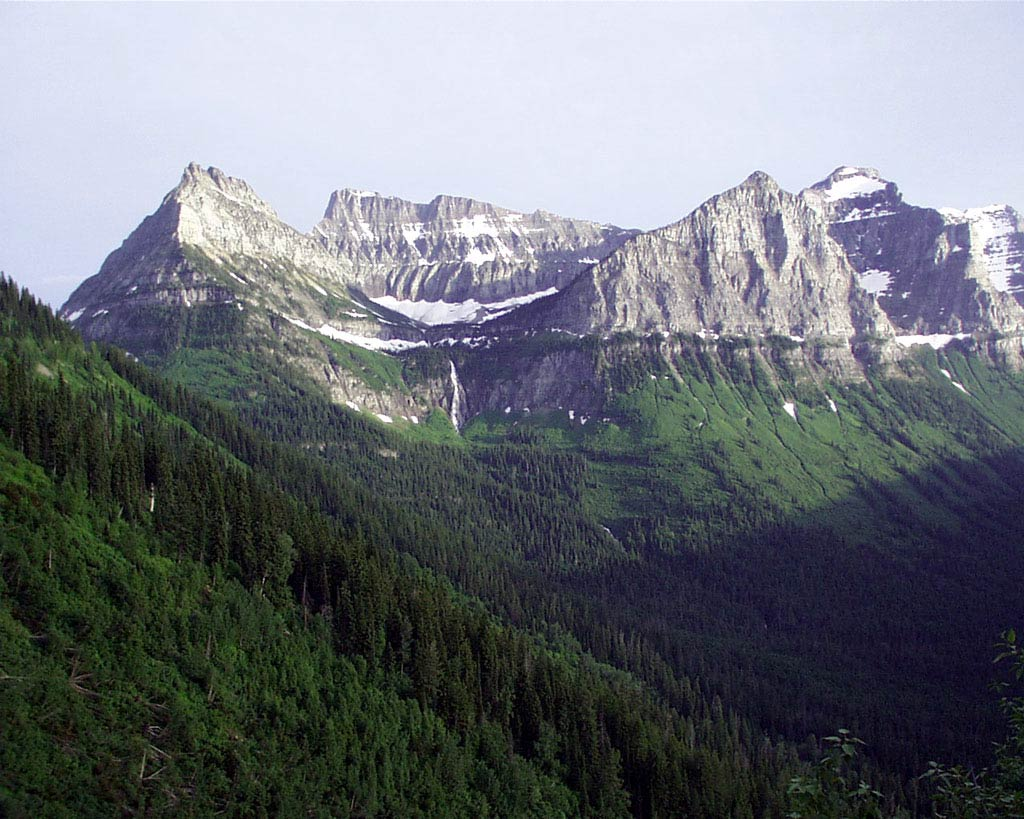
Mount Oberlin (left) as seen from the north. Bird Woman Falls and Clements Mountain in the center. Mount Cannon on the right.

Around Logan Pass as ssen from the summit of Mount Oberlin. Looking SSE.

== See also ==
- Mountains and mountain ranges of Glacier National Park (U.S.)
