= Grinnell Falls =

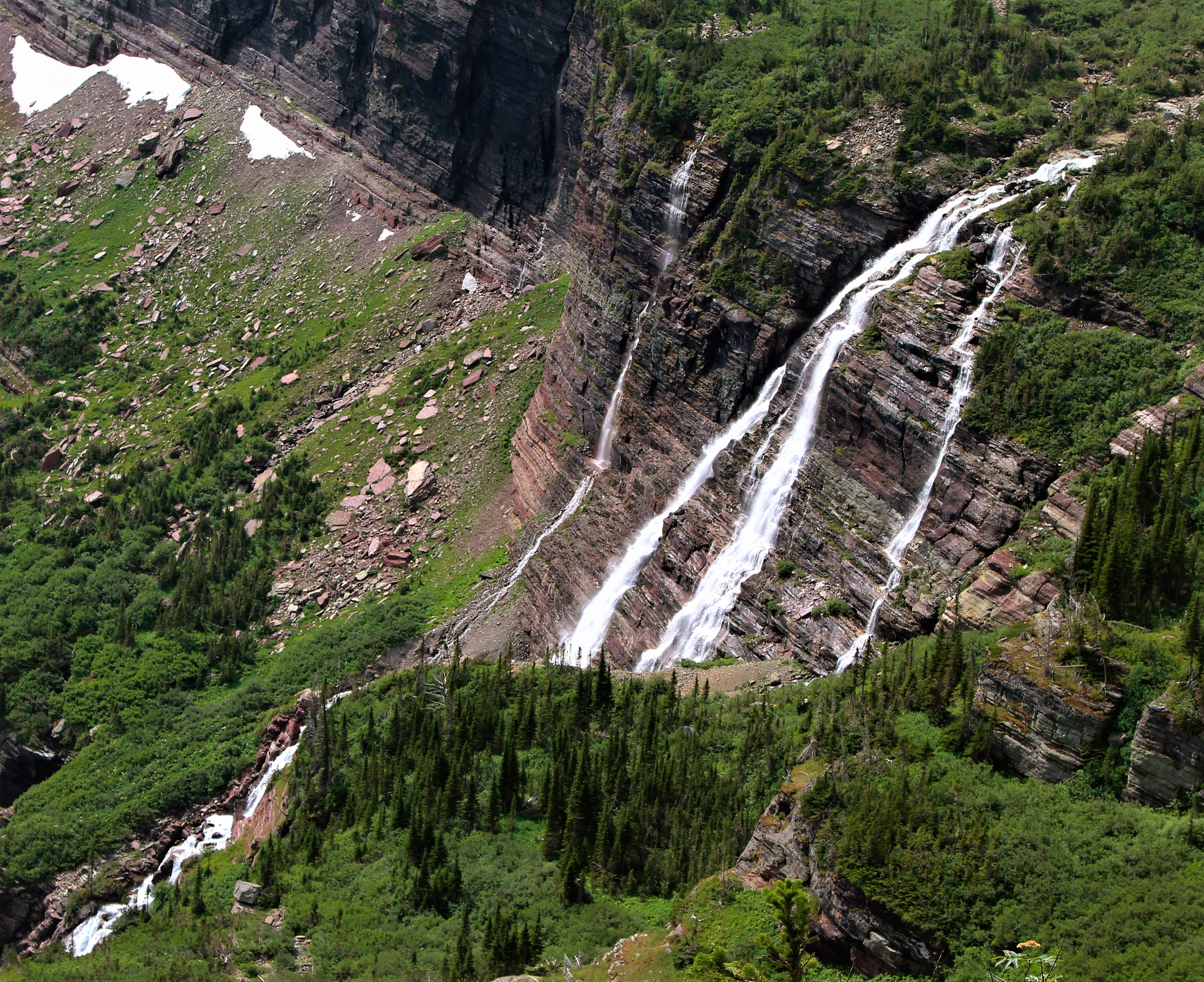
- Grinnell Falls from Grinnell Glacier Trail

- Location within Montana
- Location: Glacier National Park (U.S.), Montana, U.S.
- Coordinates: 48°45′46″N 113°43′12″W
- Type: Cascade/Fall
- Total height: 960 ft (293 m)
- Number of drops: 7
- Longest drop: 280 ft (85 m)
- Average flow rate: 0

Grinnell Falls is a waterfall in Glacier National Park, Montana, US. Grinnell Falls have several major drops in its 960 feet (290 m) descent from Grinnell Glacier with the highest estimated at 280 ft (85 m). The falls are in the Many Glacier region of the park, between Mount Grinnell and Angel Wing.
