= Feather Plume Falls =

Ephemeral waterfall in Glacier National Park, Montana, United States

- Location within Montana
- Location: Glacier National Park (U.S.), Montana, U.S.
- Coordinates: 48°45′04″N 113°42′10″W
- Type: Cascade/Fall
- Total height: 1,500 ft (457 m)
- Number of drops: 3
- Longest drop: 1,080 ft (329 m)
- Average flow rate: 0

Feather Plume Falls is an ephemeral waterfall located above Cataract Creek in Glacier National Park, Montana, US. Feather Plume Falls have several major drops in its 1,500 feet (460 m) from Grinnell Glacier with the highest estimated at 1,080 ft (330 m). The falls are on the northeast slopes of Mount Gould in the Many Glacier region of the park.
