= Grinnell Lake =

Lake in Montana, United States

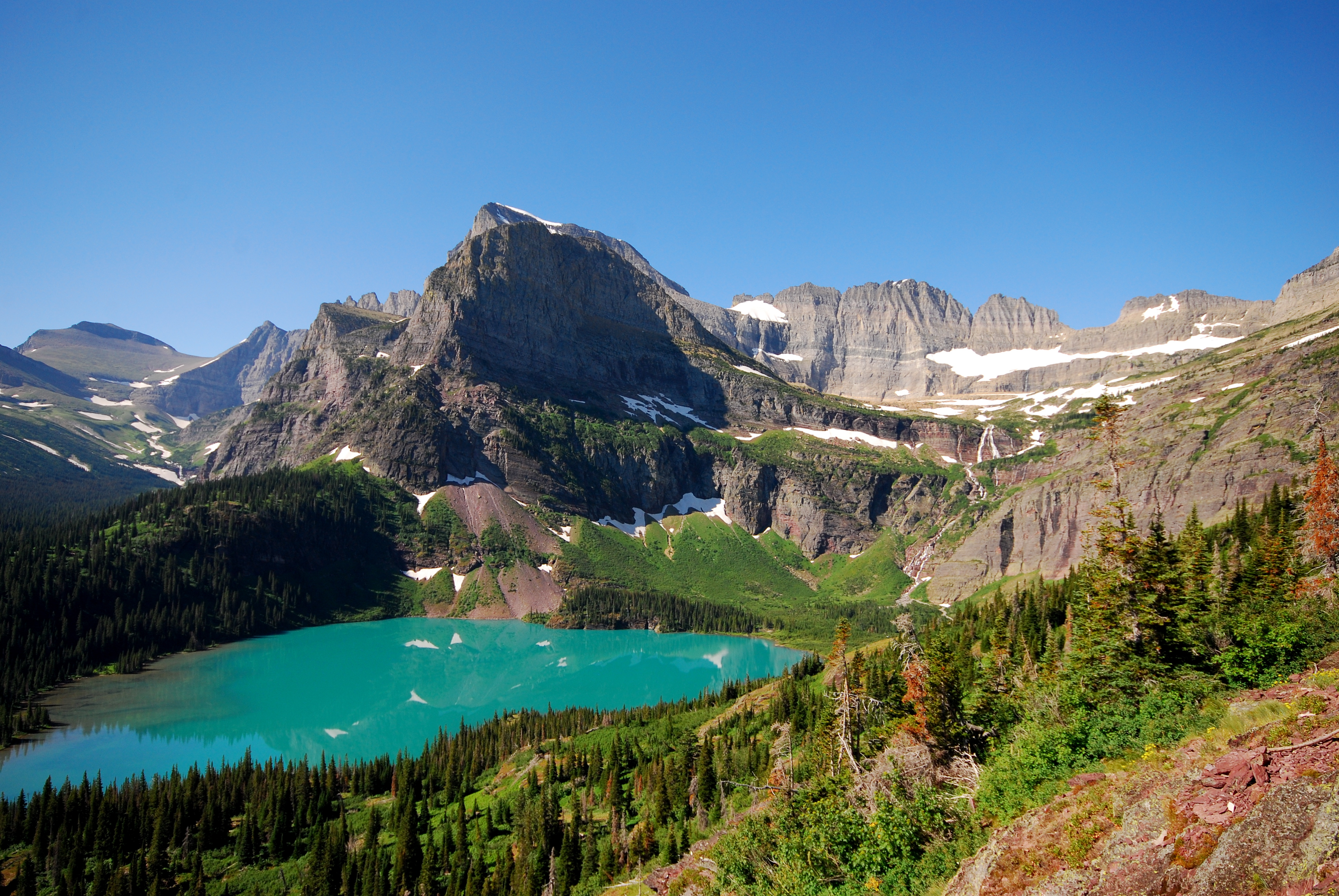
- East face of Mount Gould above Grinnell Lake

- Location in Montana
- Location: Glacier National Park; Glacier County, Montana; United States
- Coordinates: 48°45′57″N 113°42′17″W
- Primary inflows: Grinnell Creek
- Primary outflows: Grinnell Creek (to Cataract Creek)
- Basin countries: United States
- Max. length: 2,330 feet (710 m)
- Max. width: 1,730 feet (530 m)
- Surface area: 79.4 acres (32.1 ha)
- Surface elevation: 4,944 ft (1,507 m)

Grinnell Lake is located in Glacier National Park, in the U. S. state of Montana. Named after George Bird Grinnell, the lake has an opaque turquoise appearance from the rock flour (silt) which is transported to the lake from Grinnell Glacier. Grinnell Lake is accessible via the Grinnell Glacier Trail and is 3.2 miles (5.1 km) from the Many Glacier Hotel. It lies below the north face of Angel Wing.

== Gallery ==
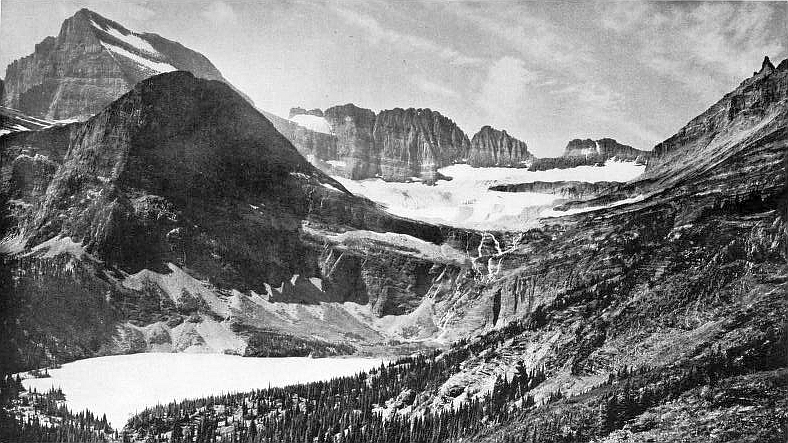
Photo by Robert Sterling Yard

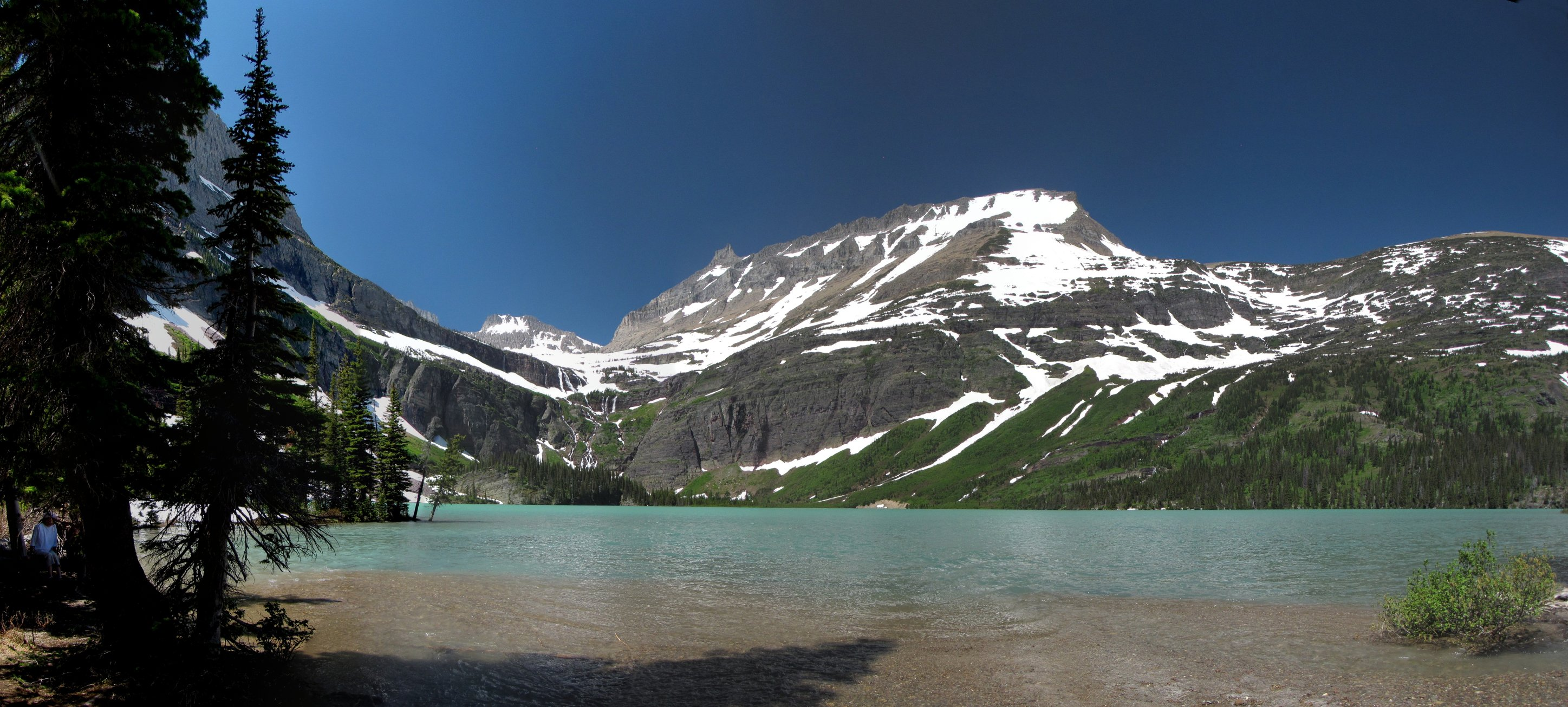
Mount Grinnell above Grinnell Lake

== See also ==
- List of lakes in Glacier County, Montana
