= Morning Eagle Falls =

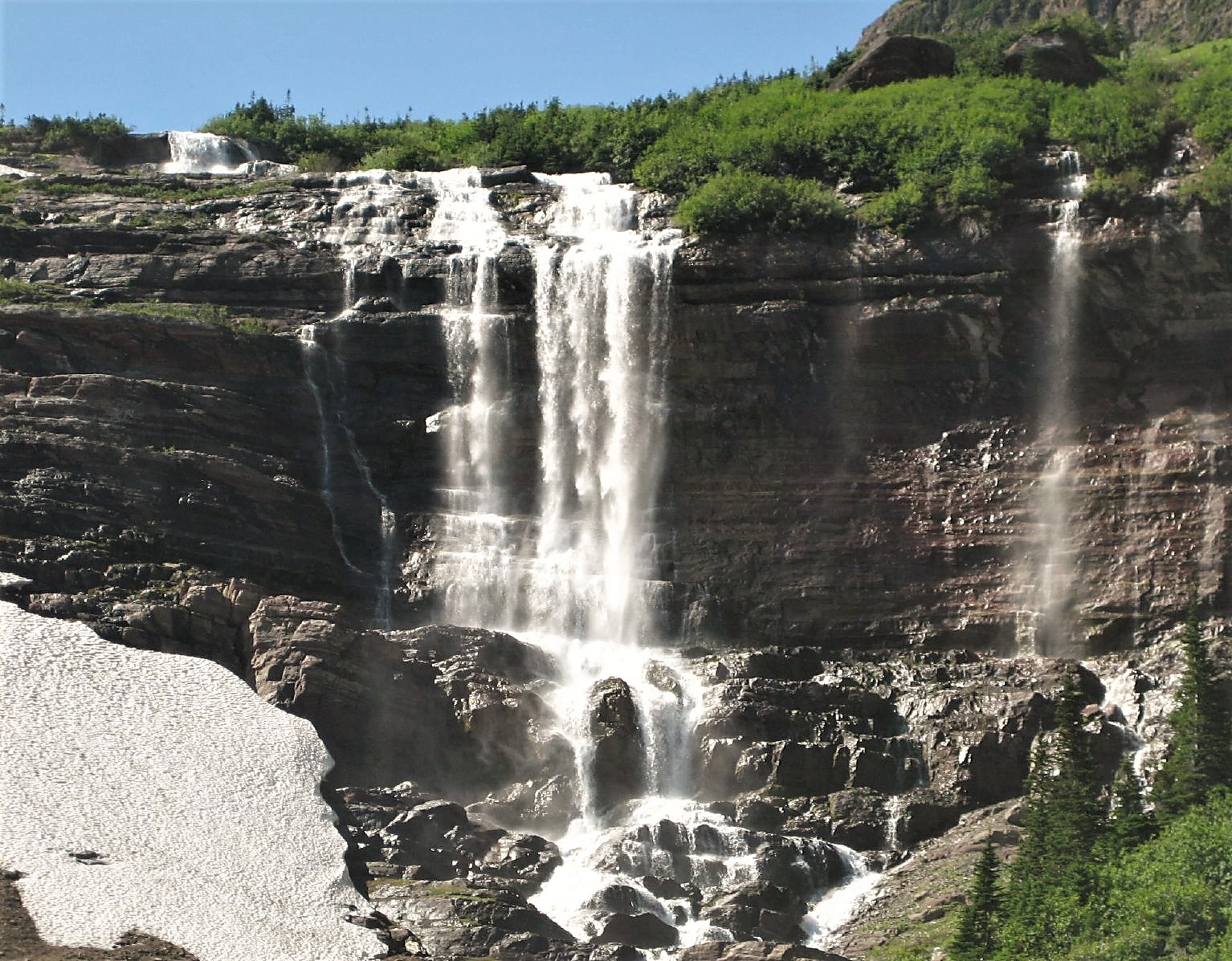

- Location within Montana
- Location: Glacier National Park (U.S.), Montana, U.S.
- Coordinates: 48°44′09″N 113°41′54″W
- Type: Cascade
- Total height: 220 ft (67 m)
- Number of drops: 3
- Longest drop: 50 ft (15 m)
- Average flow rate: 0

Morning Eagle Falls is a waterfall located on Cataract Creek in Glacier National Park, Montana, US. The waterfall is on the southeast slopes of Mount Gould in the Many Glacier region of the park.
