= Angel Wing (Glacier National Park) =

Mountain in Montana, United States

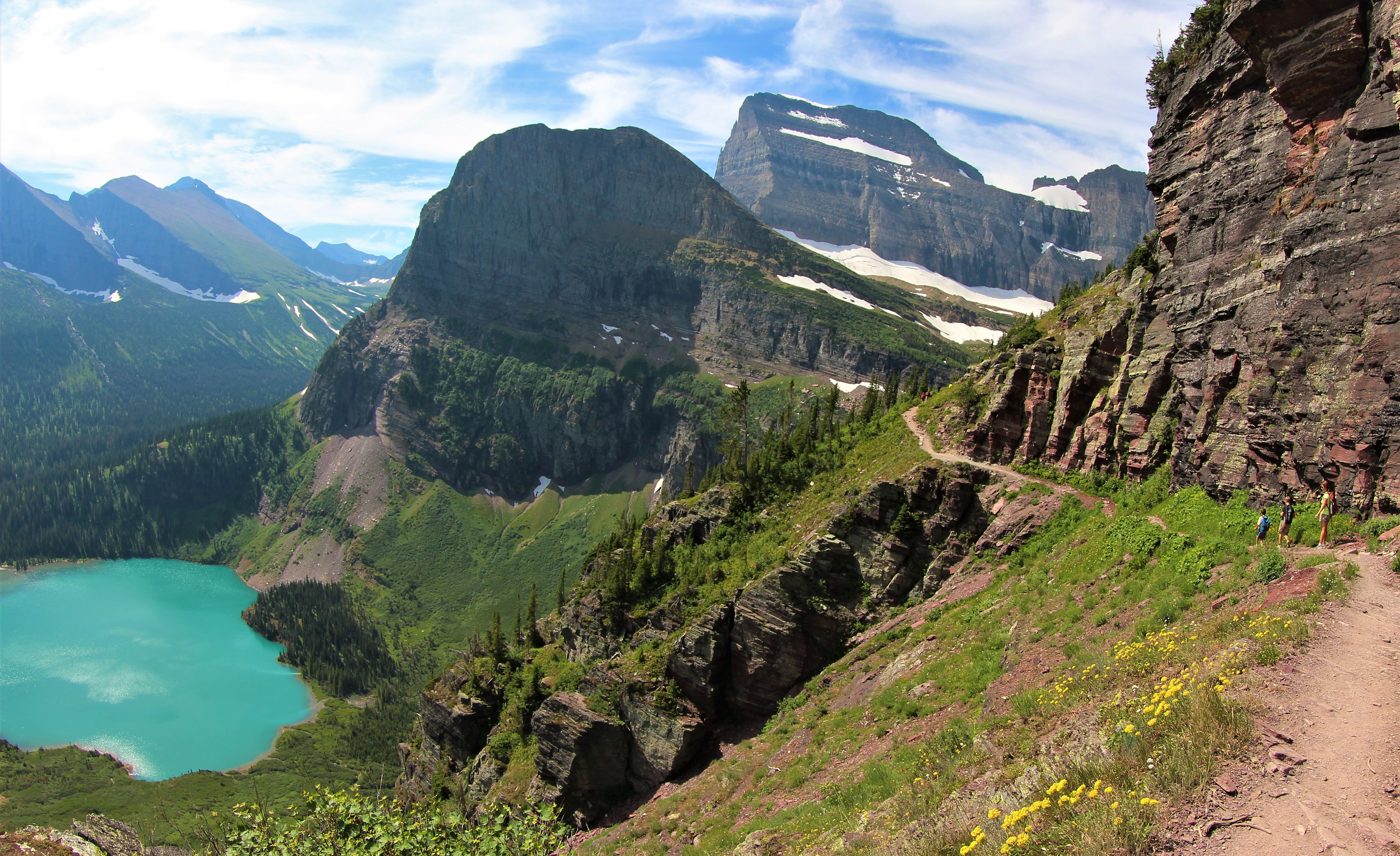
- North aspect (centered), from Grinnell Glacier Trail

Highest point
- Elevation: 7,430 ft (2,265 m)
- Prominence: 470 ft (140 m)
- Parent peak: Mount Gould (9,557 ft)
- Isolation: 0.61 mi (0.98 km)
- Coordinates: 48°45′26″N 113°42′42″W

Geography
- Location within Montana Location within the United States
- Location: Glacier National Park; Glacier County, Montana, U.S.
- Parent range: Lewis Range
- Topo map: USGS Many Glacier

Geology
- Rock age: Middle Proterozoic
- Rock type: Sedimentary rock

Angel Wing is a 7,430-foot (2,260-meter) elevation mountain summit located in the Lewis Range, of Glacier National Park in the U.S. state of Montana. It is situated one mile east of the Continental Divide, in Glacier County. It can be seen from the Many Glacier area, and up close from the Grinnell Glacier Trail. Topographic relief is significant as the north aspect rises nearly 2,500 feet (760 meters) above Grinnell Lake in one-half mile.

== Climate ==
Based on the Köppen climate classification, Angel Wing is located in an alpine subarctic climate zone with long, cold, snowy winters, and cool to warm summers. Temperatures can drop below −10 °F with wind chill factors below −30 °F. Precipitation runoff from the peak drains into Grinnell and Cataract Creeks, which are part of the St. Mary River drainage basin.

== Geology ==
Like other mountains in Glacier National Park, Angel Wing is composed of sedimentary rock laid down during the Precambrian to Jurassic periods. Formed in shallow seas, this sedimentary rock was initially uplifted beginning 170 million years ago when the Lewis Overthrust fault pushed an enormous slab of precambrian rocks 3 mi (4.8 km) thick, 50 miles (80 km) wide and 160 miles (260 km) long over younger rock of the cretaceous period. The summit is composed of Empire Formation of the Neogene period, and it overlays the Grinnell Formation which is a layer of sandstone and argillite.

== Gallery ==
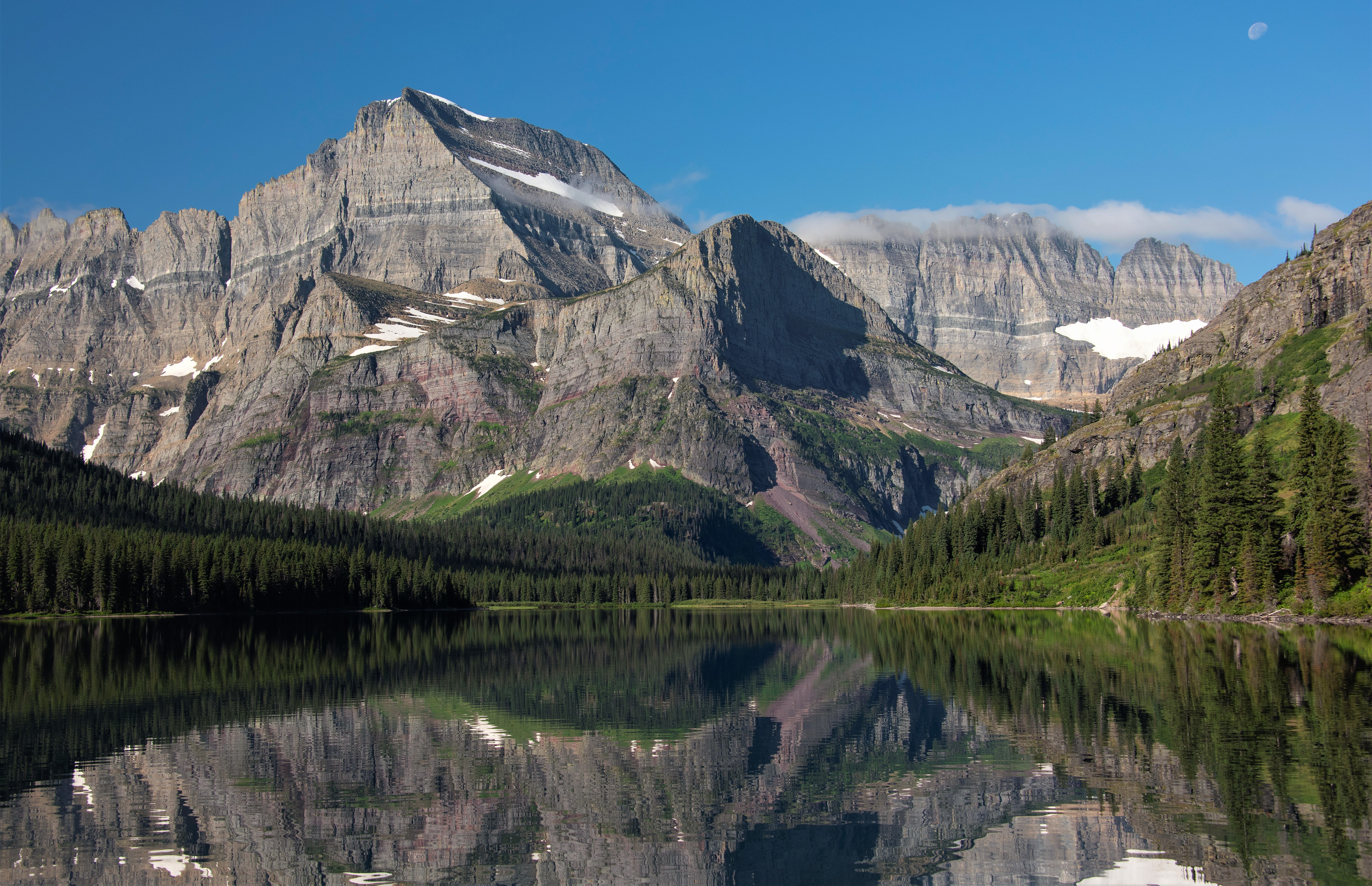
Angel Wing (centered) reflected in Lake Josephine with Mt. Gould (behind, left)

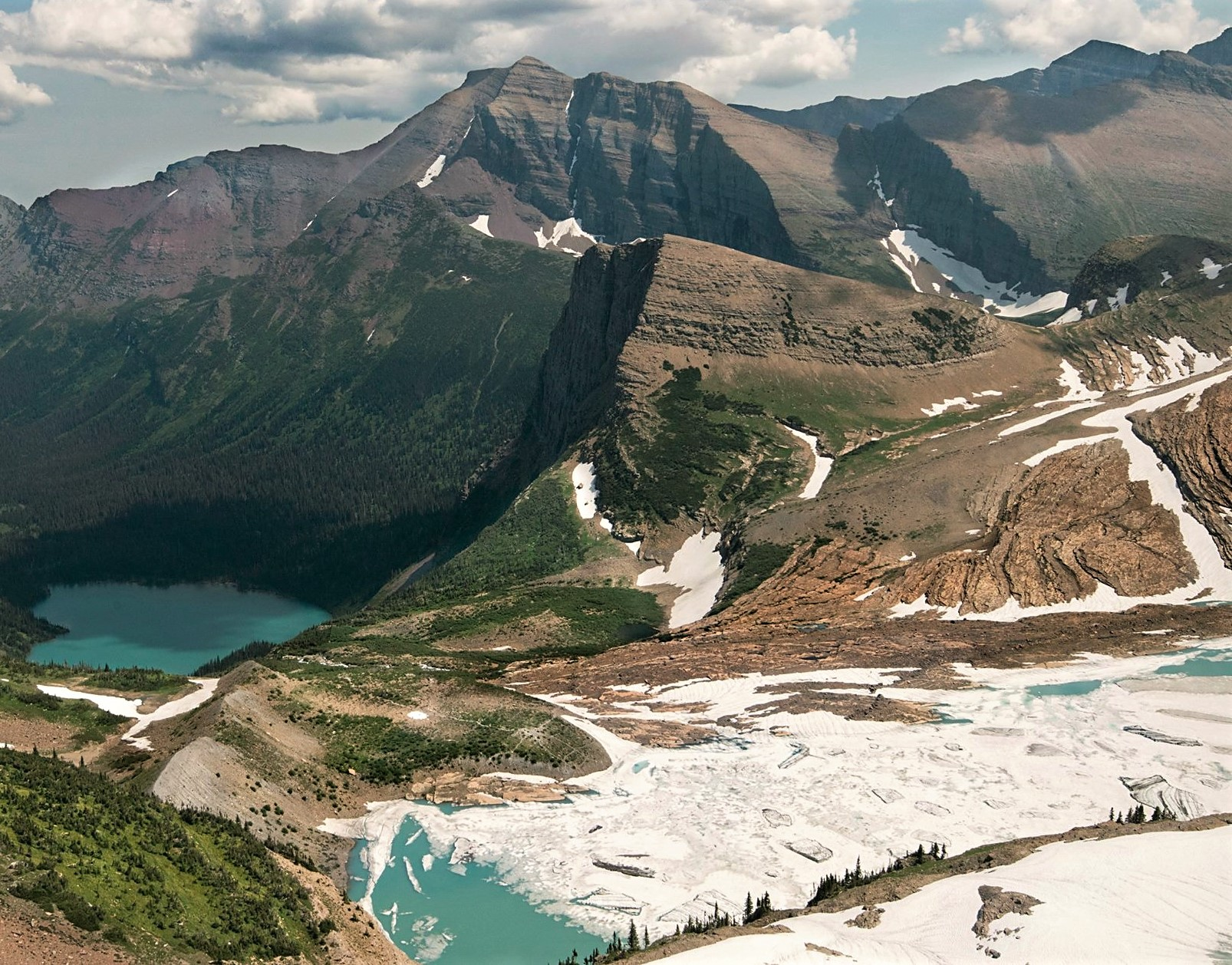
Angel Wing (centered) with Allen Mountain beyond

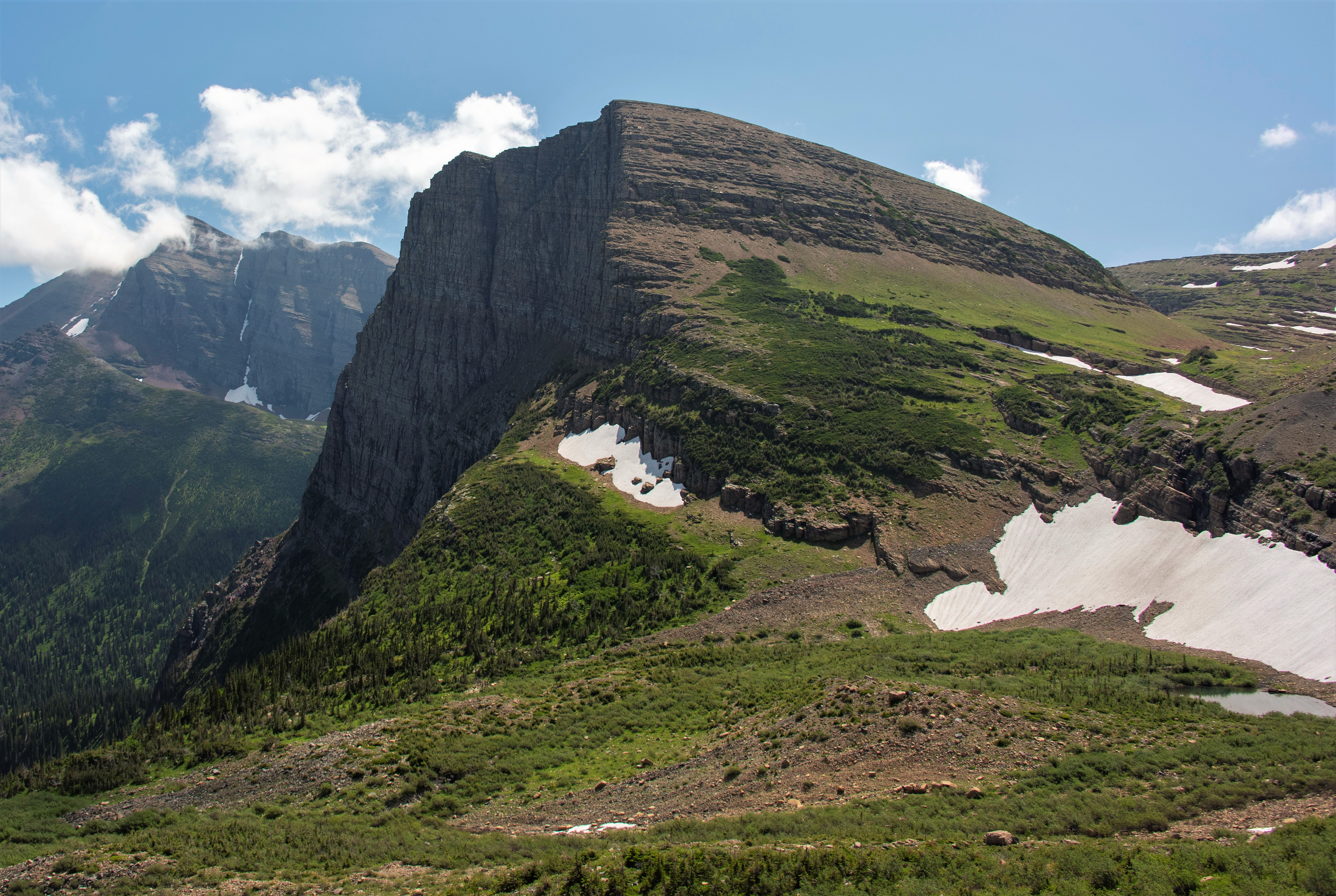
West aspect

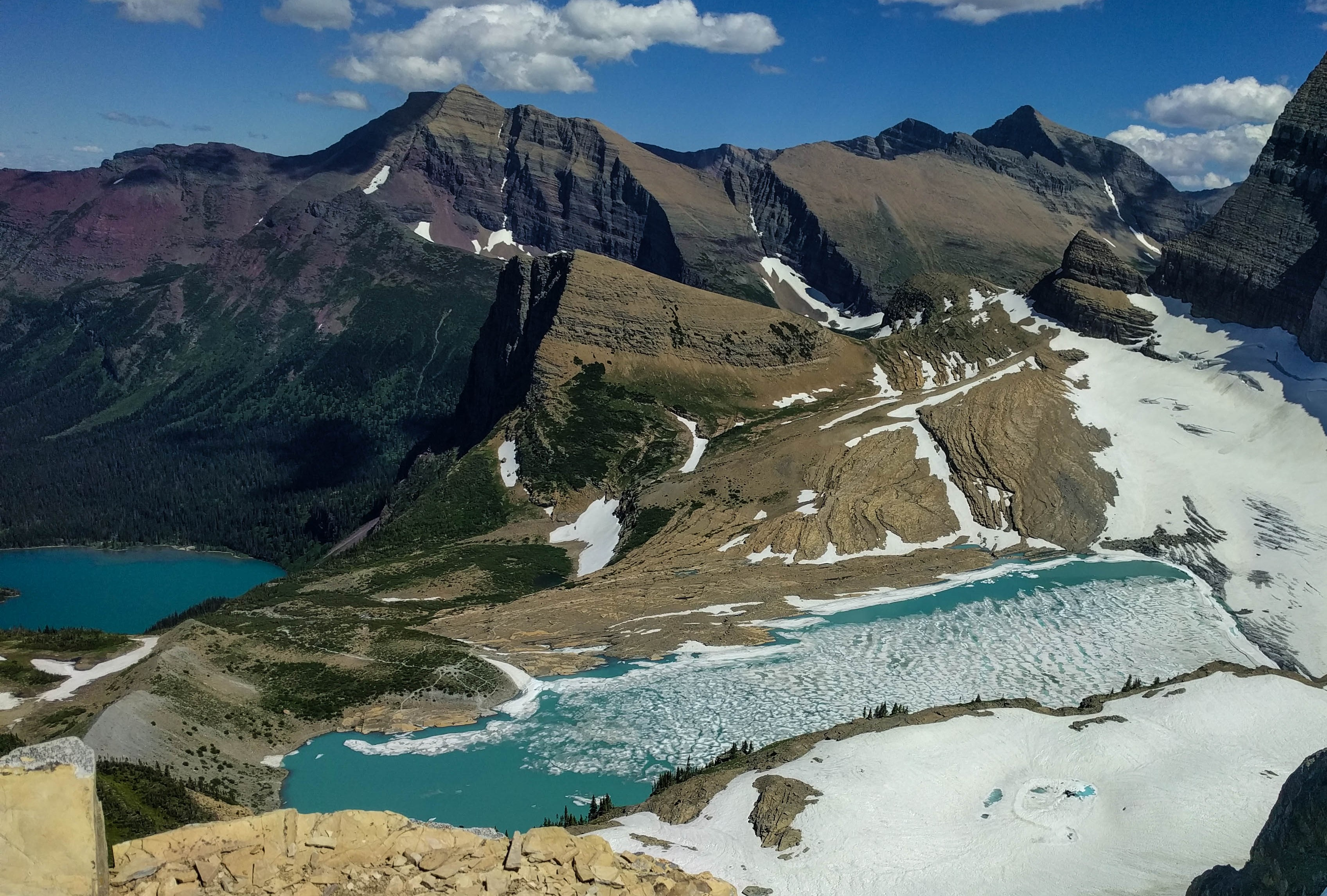
Angel Wing centered, with Upper Grinnell Lake

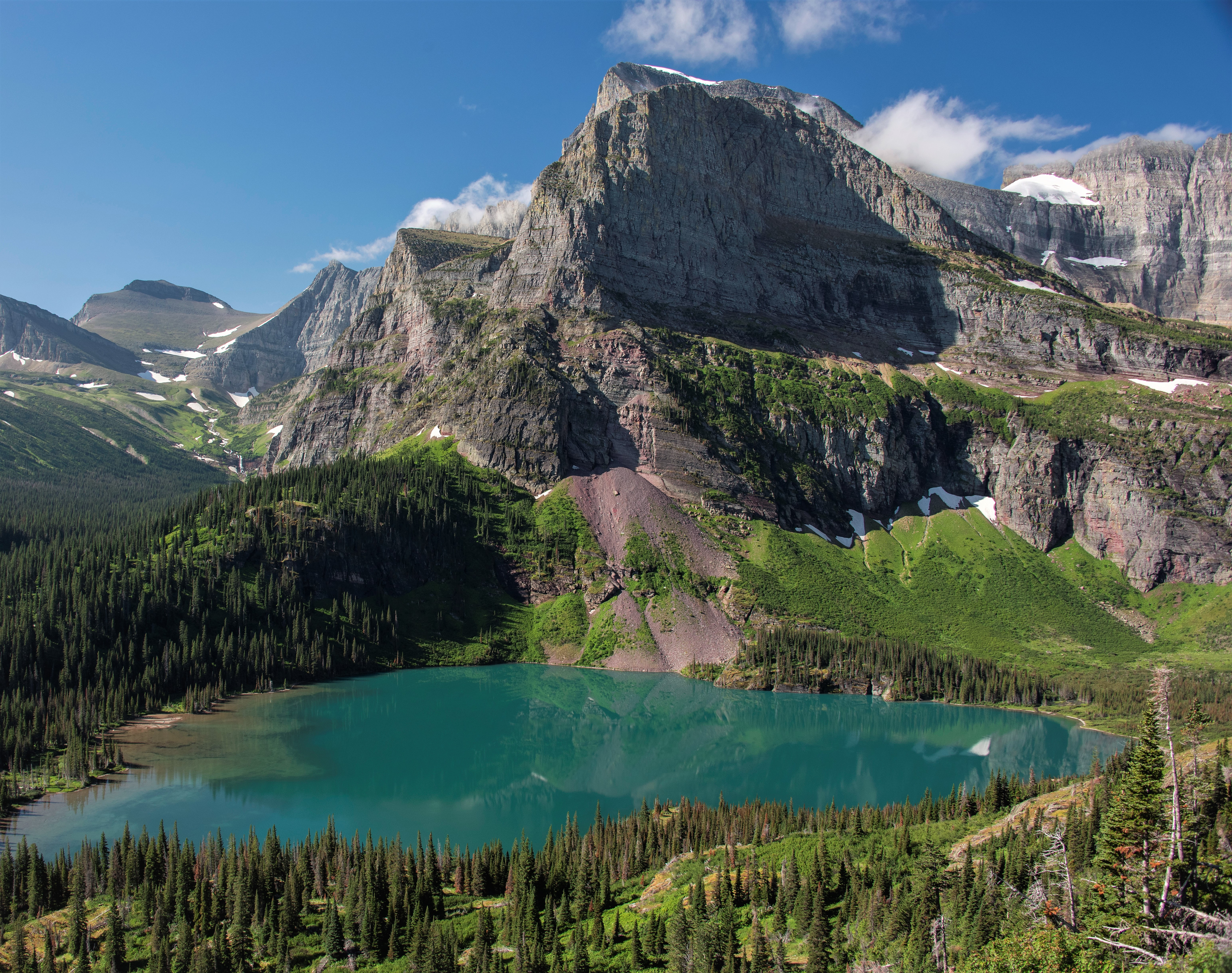
North aspect, with Grinnell Lake

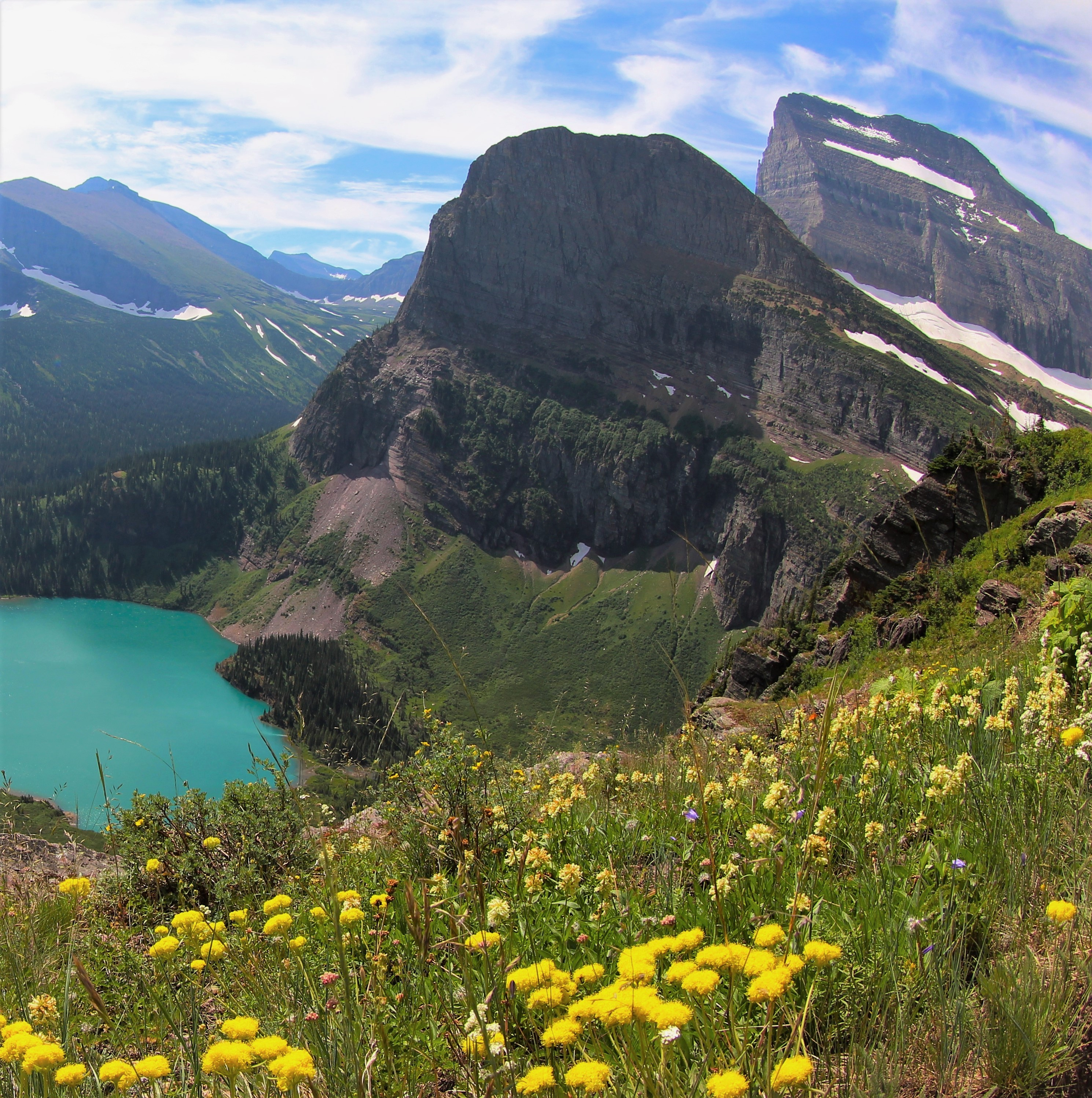
North aspect with Mt. Gould behind

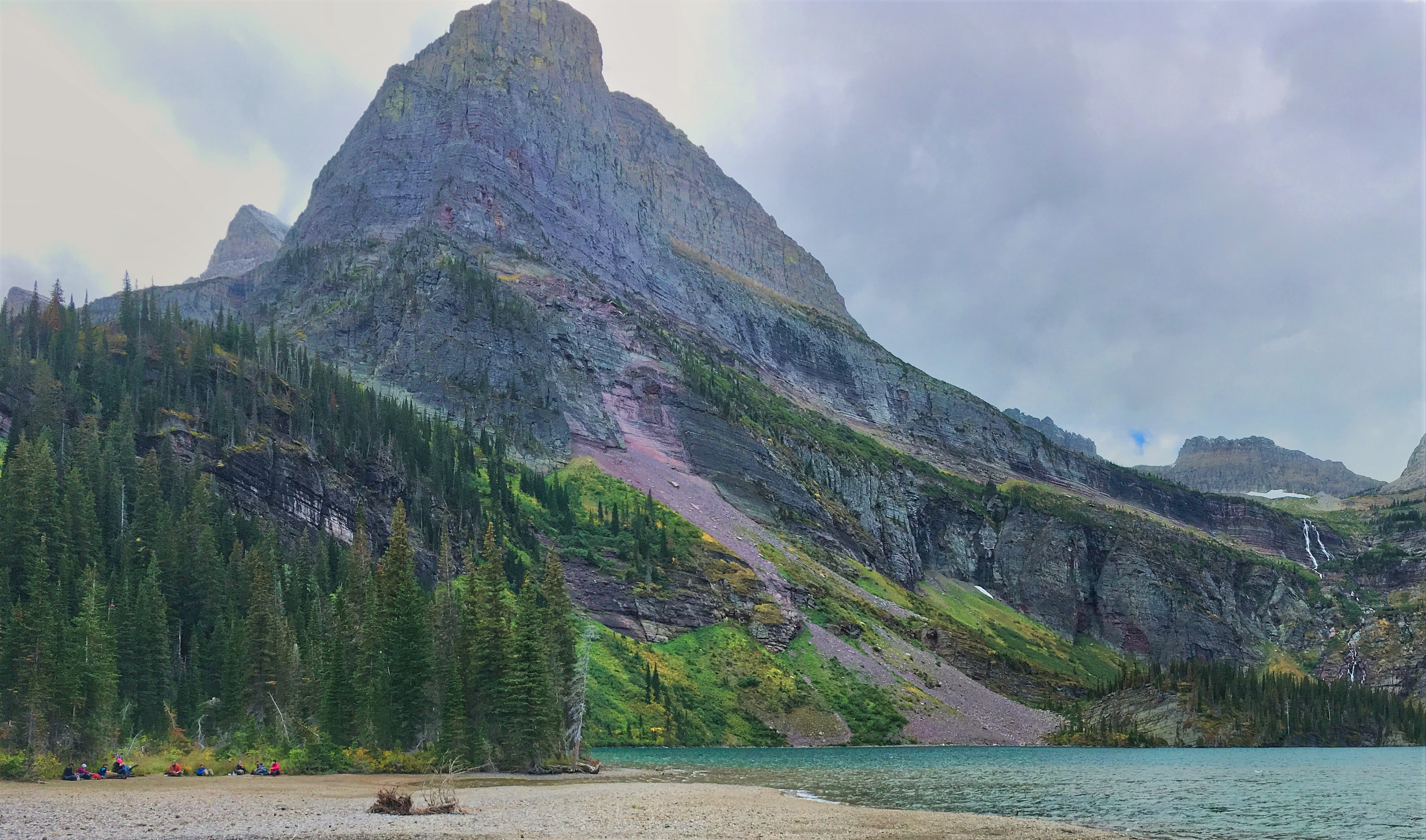
Angel Wing from Grinnell Lake

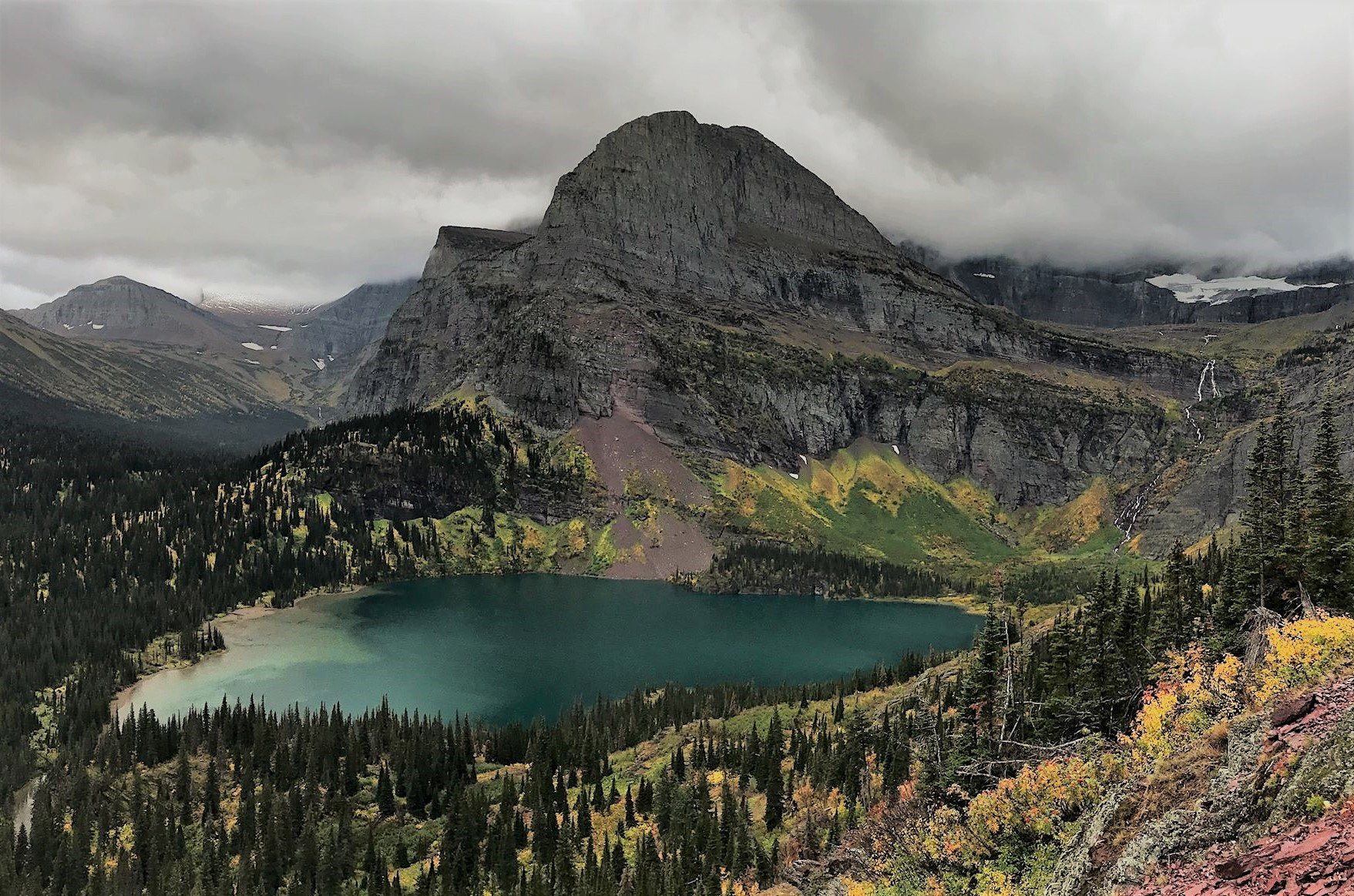
Grinnell Lake and Angel Wing

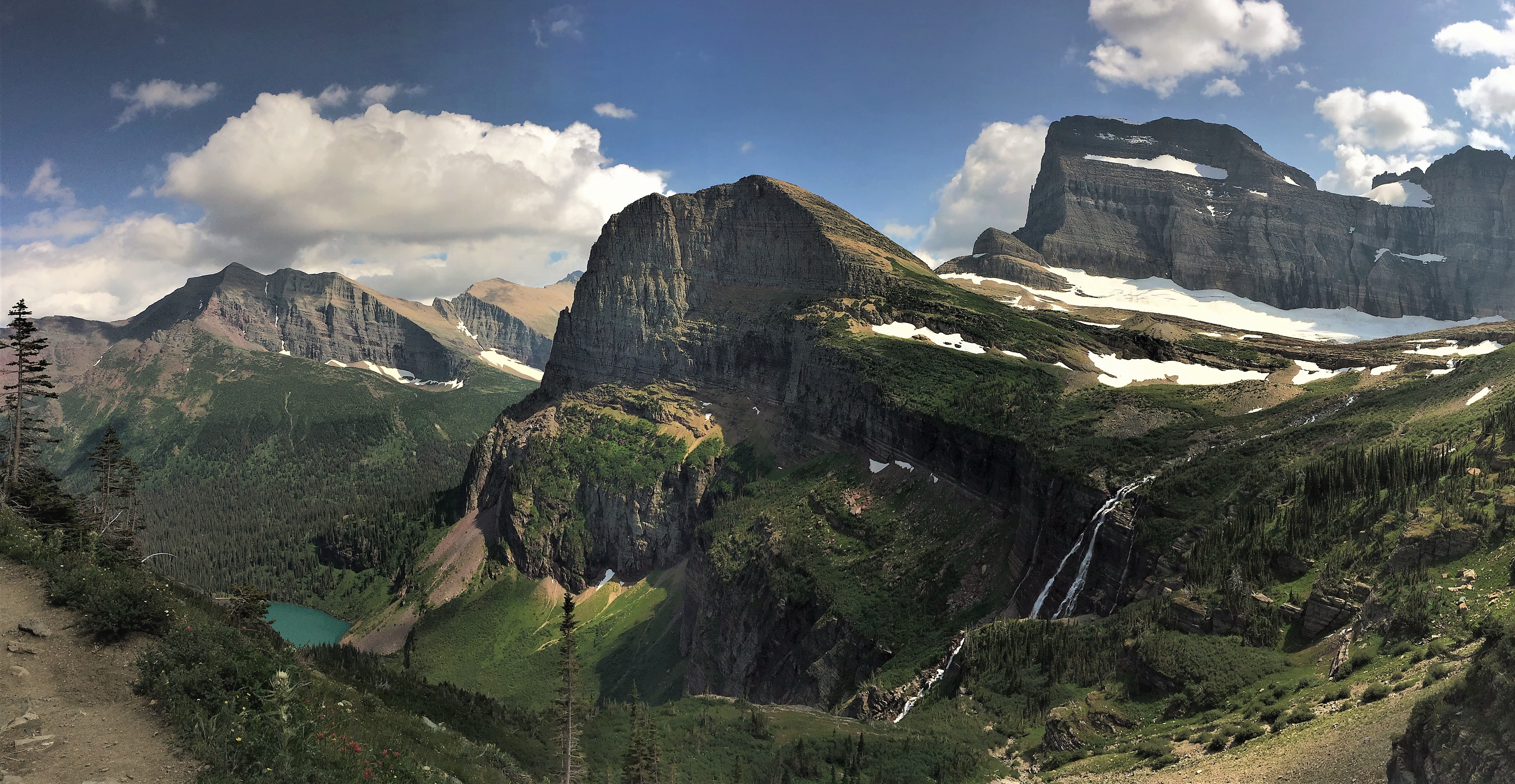
Angel Wing (centered), Grinnell Falls, Mt. Gould

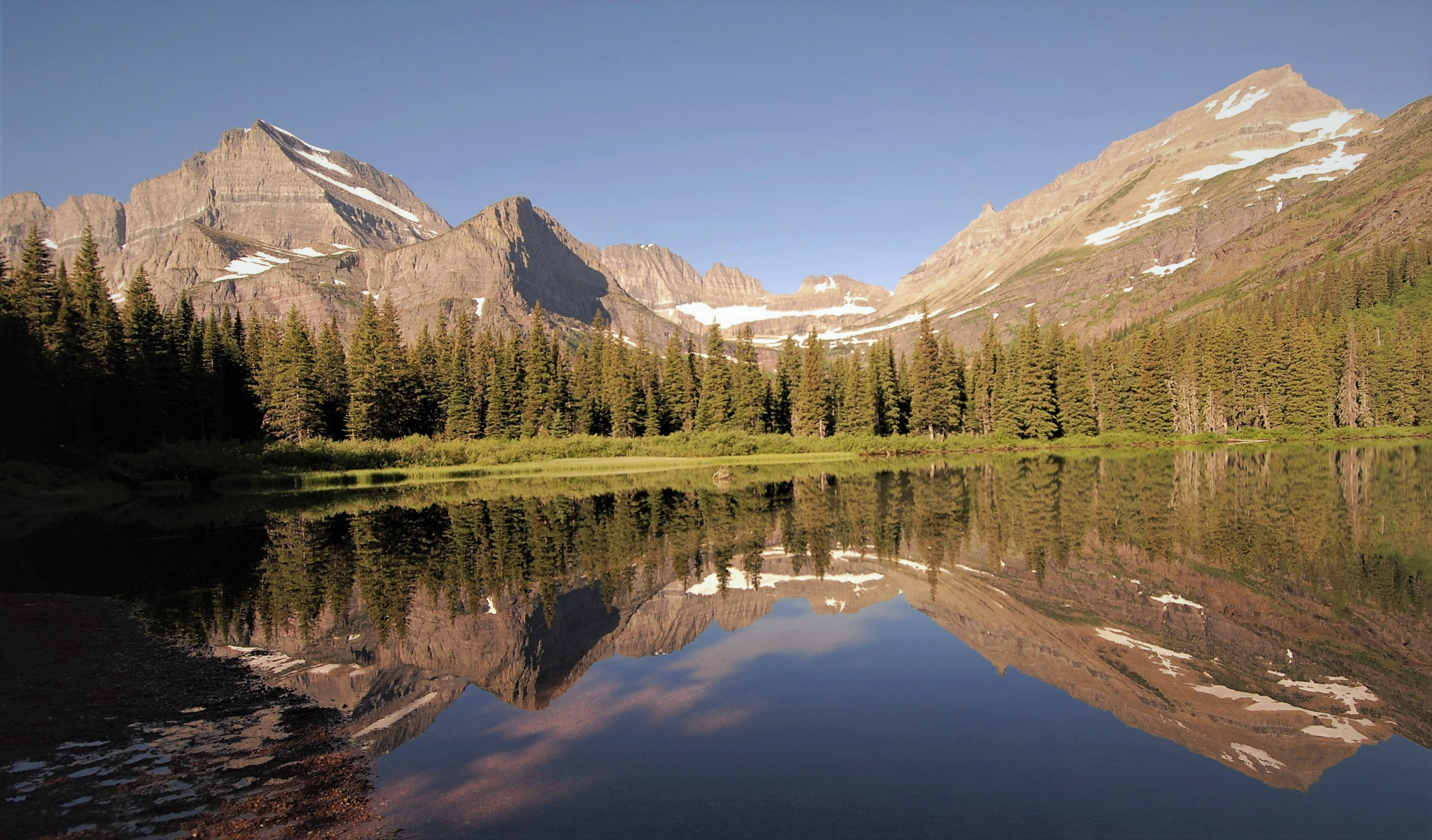
Mt. Gould, Angel Wing, Mt. Grinnell

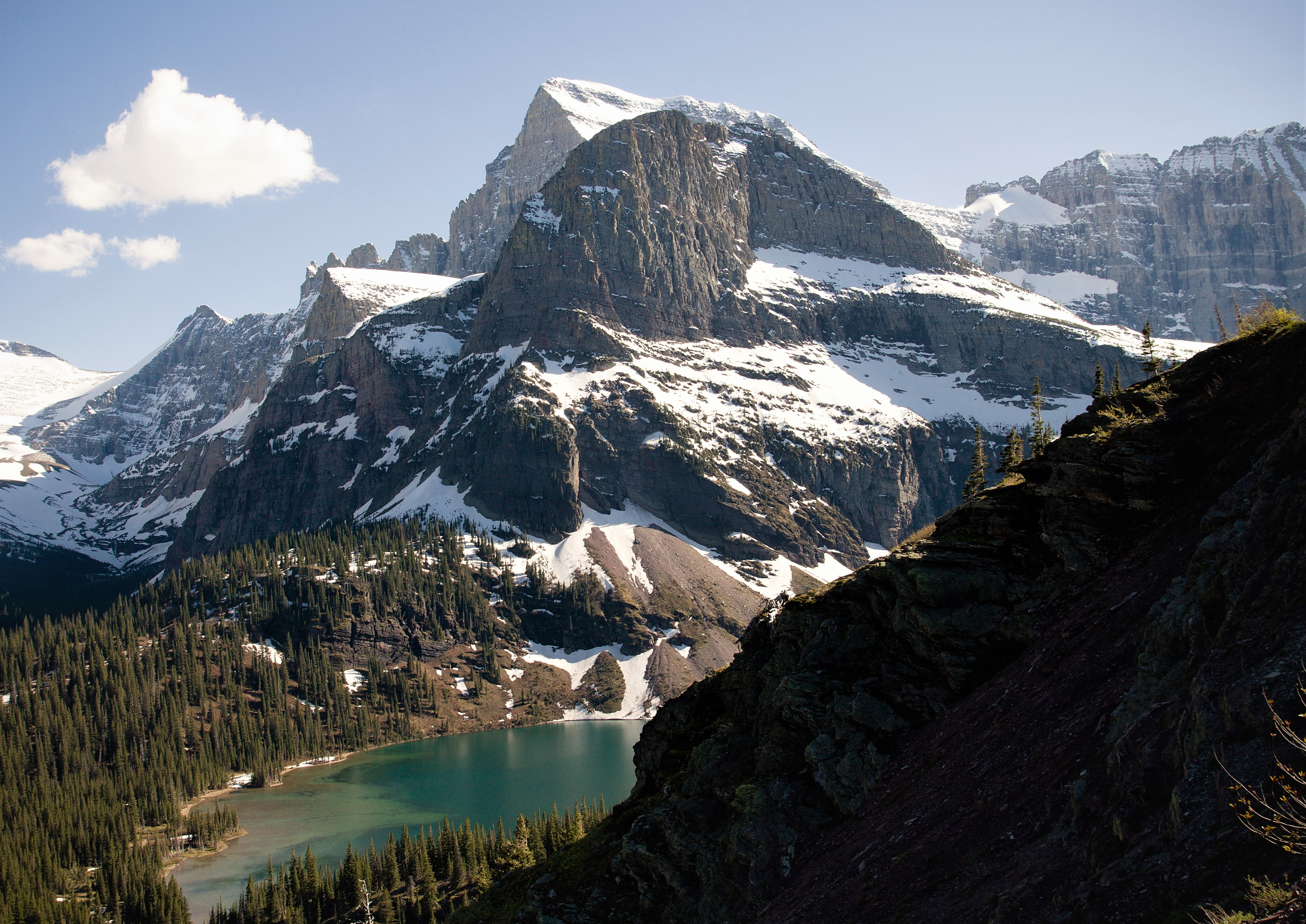

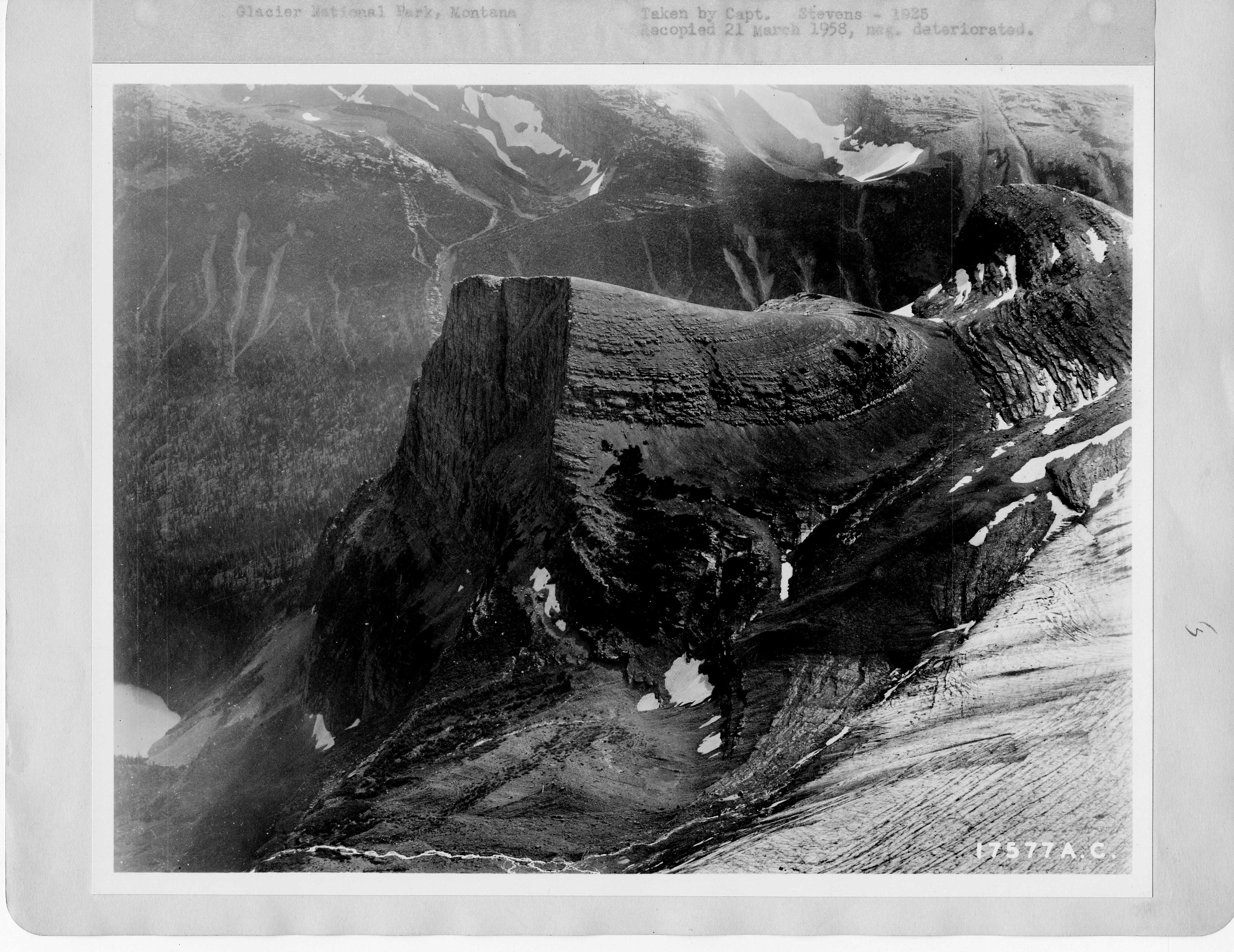
Aerial view, circa 1925

== See also ==
- Geology of the Rocky Mountains
- List of mountains and mountain ranges of Glacier National Park (U.S.)
