= Bird Woman Falls =

Waterfall in Glacier National Park, Montana, United States

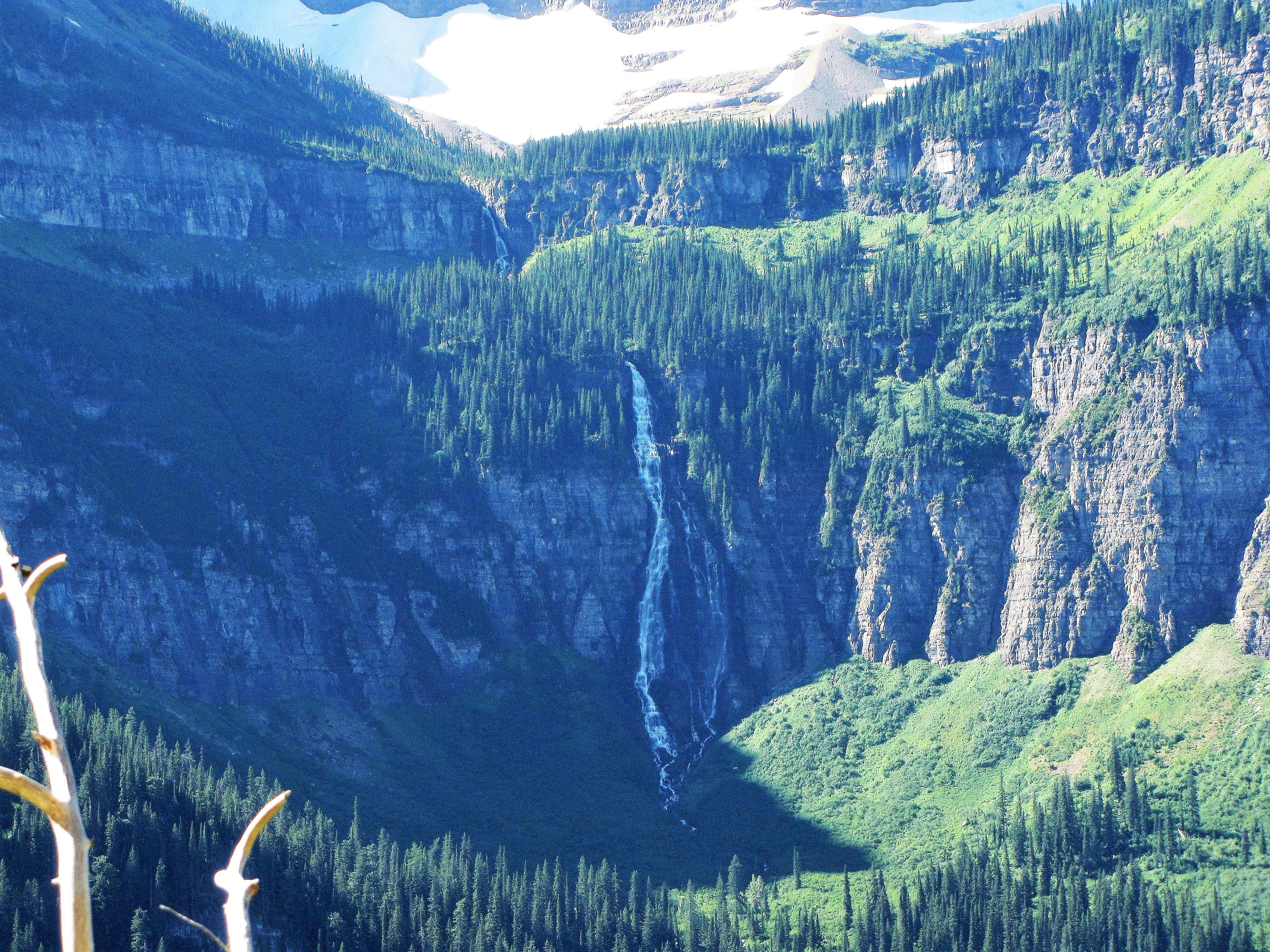

- Location within Montana
- Location: Glacier National Park, Montana, U.S.
- Coordinates: 48°42′29″N 113°44′51″W
- Type: Horsetail
- Total height: 960 feet (290 m)
- Number of drops: 2
- Longest drop: 560 feet (170 m)
- Average width: 100 feet (30 m)
- Watercourse: Tributary of Logan Creek

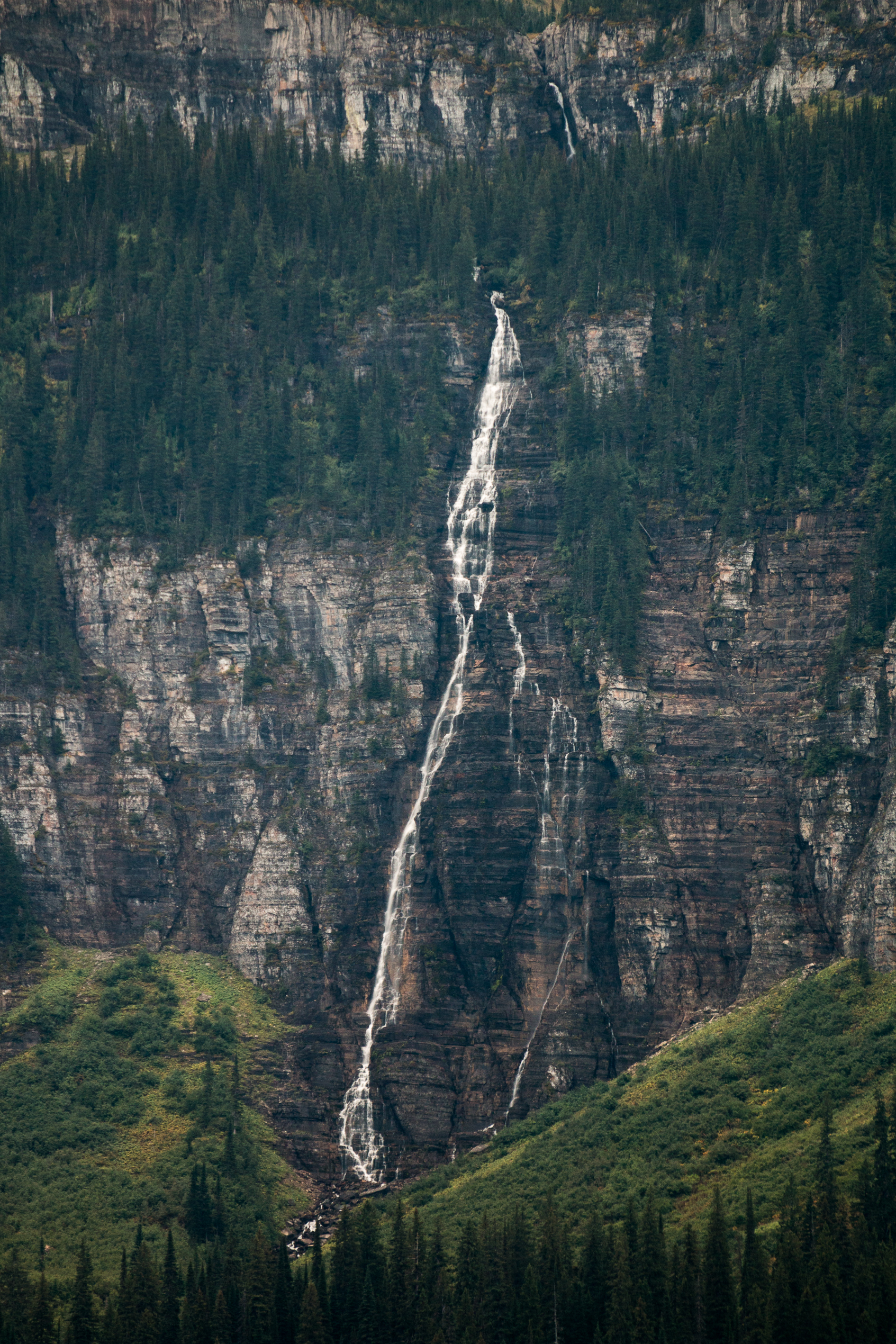
The Bird Woman Falls seen from the Going-to-the-Sun Road

Bird Woman Falls is a 560 feet (170 m) waterfall located immediately west of the continental divide in Glacier National Park, Montana, United States. The falls are readily visible from a distance of two miles (3.2 km) along the Going-to-the-Sun Road, which bisects the park east to west. The falls are fed by snowfields and a remnant glacier located on the north and west flanks of Mount Oberlin. The falls flow is greatest in late spring and early summer and has been known to almost cease flowing in the autumn.

== See also ==
- List of waterfalls
