= Memorial Falls (Montana) =

Waterfall in Montana

- Interactive map of Memorial Falls
- Location: Cascade County, Montana
- Coordinates: 46.915170°N 110.693037°W
- Number of drops: 2
- Watercourse: Memorial Creek

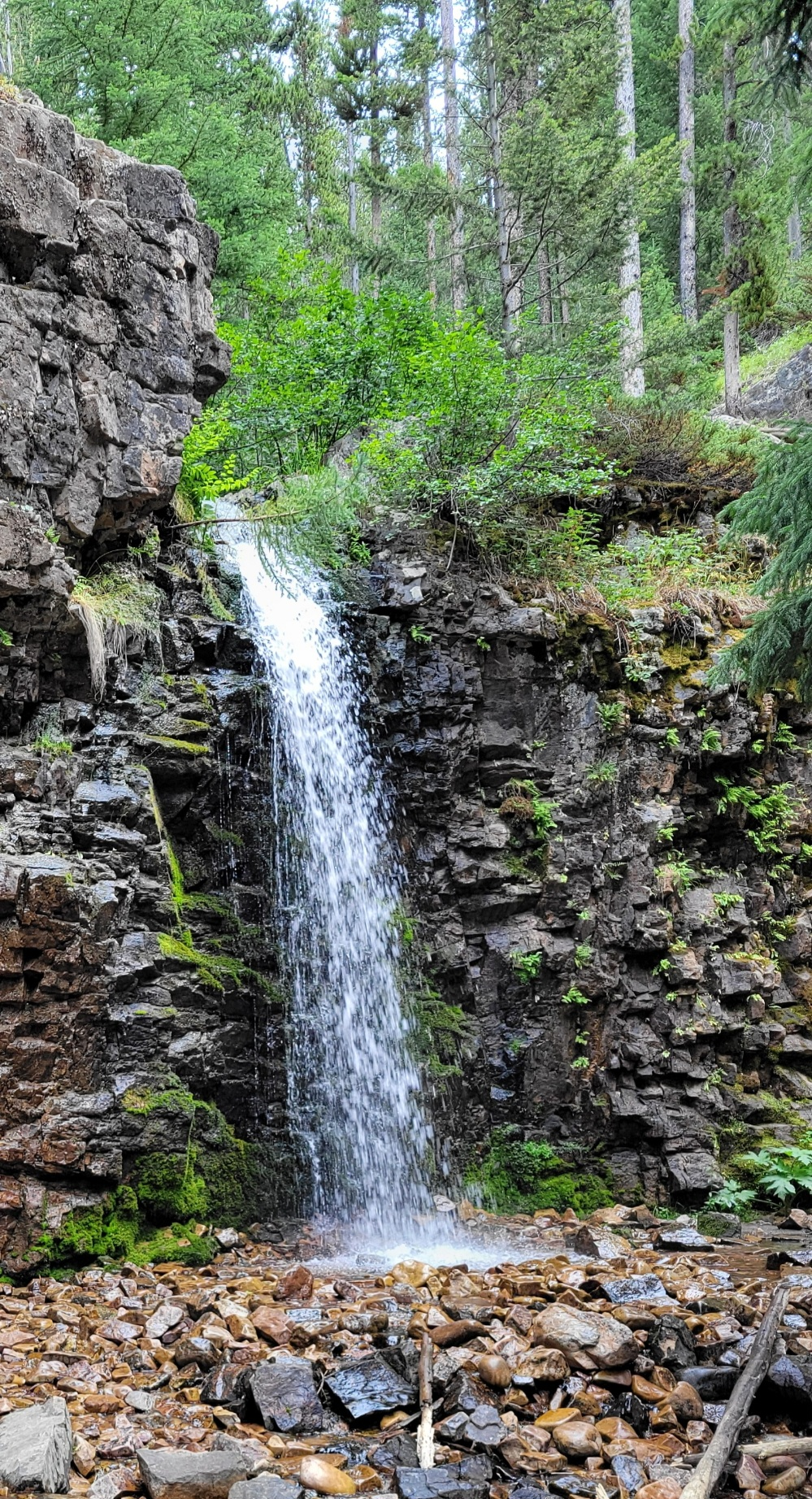
The first waterfall of Memorial Falls

Memorial Falls is a series of two waterfalls in Cascade County, Montana. The falls are located on Memorial Creek and can be accessed by the Memorial Falls Trailhead.

== Location ==
Memorial Falls are located on US 89 between Neihart (Specifically 2.5 miles) and Showdown Ski Resort. From the start of the Memorial Falls Trailhead, the two falls are located 1/2 a mile.

== Activities ==
Memorial Falls offers hiking, photography, and sight-seeing opportunities year-round, and ice climbing is sometimes available in the winter depending on ice conditions. Rock climbing opportunities are also available in the area. The Memorial Falls Trailhead does not permit motorized vehicles.

== Geography ==
The waterfalls both sit on pieces of Precambrian sandstone formed from the Neihart Formation over 1,450,000,000 years ago, which consists of sandy areas and deposits of sandstone. The formation sits at the base of the Belt Formation, and is some of the oldest deposits in the area. In the canyon on Memorial Falls Trailhead, Niehart Quarttzite can also be found.

== See also ==
- Great Falls
- White Sulphur Springs
- Monarch
- Sluice Boxes State Park
- Belt, Montana
