= Feather Woman Falls =

- Location within Montana
- Location: Glacier National Park (U.S.), Montana, U.S.
- Coordinates: 48°36′42″N 113°46′44″W
- Type: Cascade/Fall
- Total height: 350 ft (107 m)
- Longest drop: 350 ft (107 m)

Feather Woman Falls is a waterfall located in Glacier National Park, Montana, US. The falls emerge from the base of a terminal moraine and drop 350 feet (110 m) towards the valley below. Altogether there are at least four waterfalls in this series, each originating from a permanent snowfield where a glacier once laid. The waterfall can be reached after a short hike from the Sperry Chalet via the Sperry Trail.
