= Twin Falls (Glacier County, Montana) =

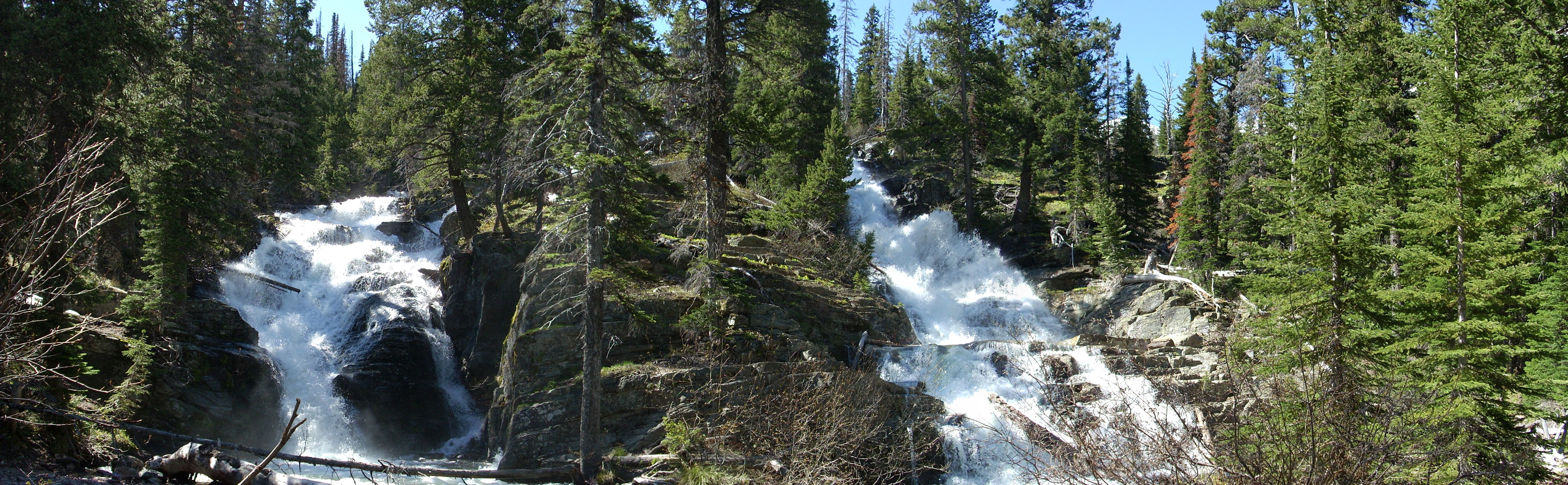
- Twin Falls

- Location within Montana
- Location: Glacier National Park (U.S.), Montana, U.S.
- Coordinates: 48°28′35″N 113°25′36″W
- Type: Cascade/Fall
- Total height: 80 ft (24 m)

Twin Falls are a pair of waterfalls located in Glacier National Park, Montana, US. The falls descend from outlet streams from the surrounding peaks and No Name Lake and split into two waterfalls as they cascade 80 feet (24 m) into Two Medicine Valley. The falls can be reached by a hike of less than a mile west of Two Medicine Lake.
