= Ptarmigan Falls =

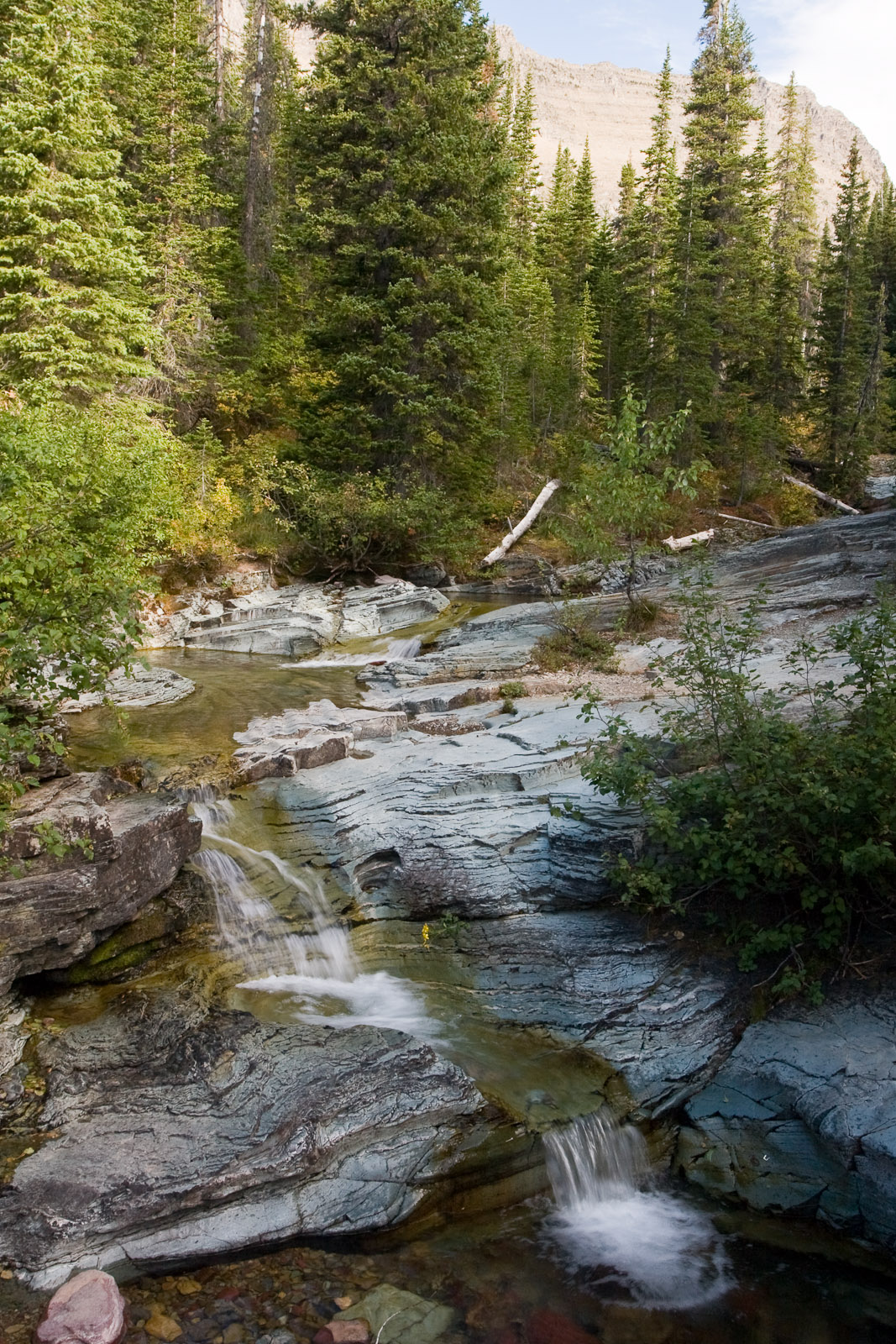
- Some of the cascades on Ptarmigan Falls

- Location within Montana
- Location: Glacier National Park (U.S.), Montana, U.S.
- Coordinates: 48°49′17″N 113°42′42″W
- Type: Cascade/Fall
- Total height: 200 ft (61 m)
- Longest drop: 30 ft (9 m)

Ptarmigan Falls is a waterfall located in Glacier National Park, Montana, US. Ptarmigan Falls has a series of cascades and at least one drop of over 30 feet (9.1 m) as it descends downstream along Ptarmigan Creek. The falls can only be seen by hiking west on the Ptarmigan Trail from Swiftcurrent Auto Camp Historic District in the Many Glacier region of the park.
