= Two Medicine Falls =

- Location within Montana
- Location: Glacier National Park (U.S.), Montana, U.S.
- Coordinates: 48°27′56″N 113°13′18″W
- Type: Cascade
- Total height: 20 ft (6 m)
- Number of drops: 3
- Longest drop: 10 ft (3 m)
- Average flow rate: 0

Two Medicine Falls is a waterfall located on the Two Medicine River in the southeastern portion of Glacier National Park, Montana, US.
