= Akaiyan Falls =

Ephemeral waterfall located in Glacier National Park, Montana, United States

- Location within Montana
- Location: Glacier National Park (U.S.), Montana, U.S.
- Coordinates: 48°36′51″N 113°47′05″W
- Type: Cascade/Fall
- Total height: 280 ft (85 m)

Akaiyan Falls is an ephemeral waterfall located in Glacier National Park, Montana in the United States. Akaiyan Falls can be accessed via the Sperry Trail and has a series of drops, the tallest of which is 280 feet (85 m).
