= Monument Falls =

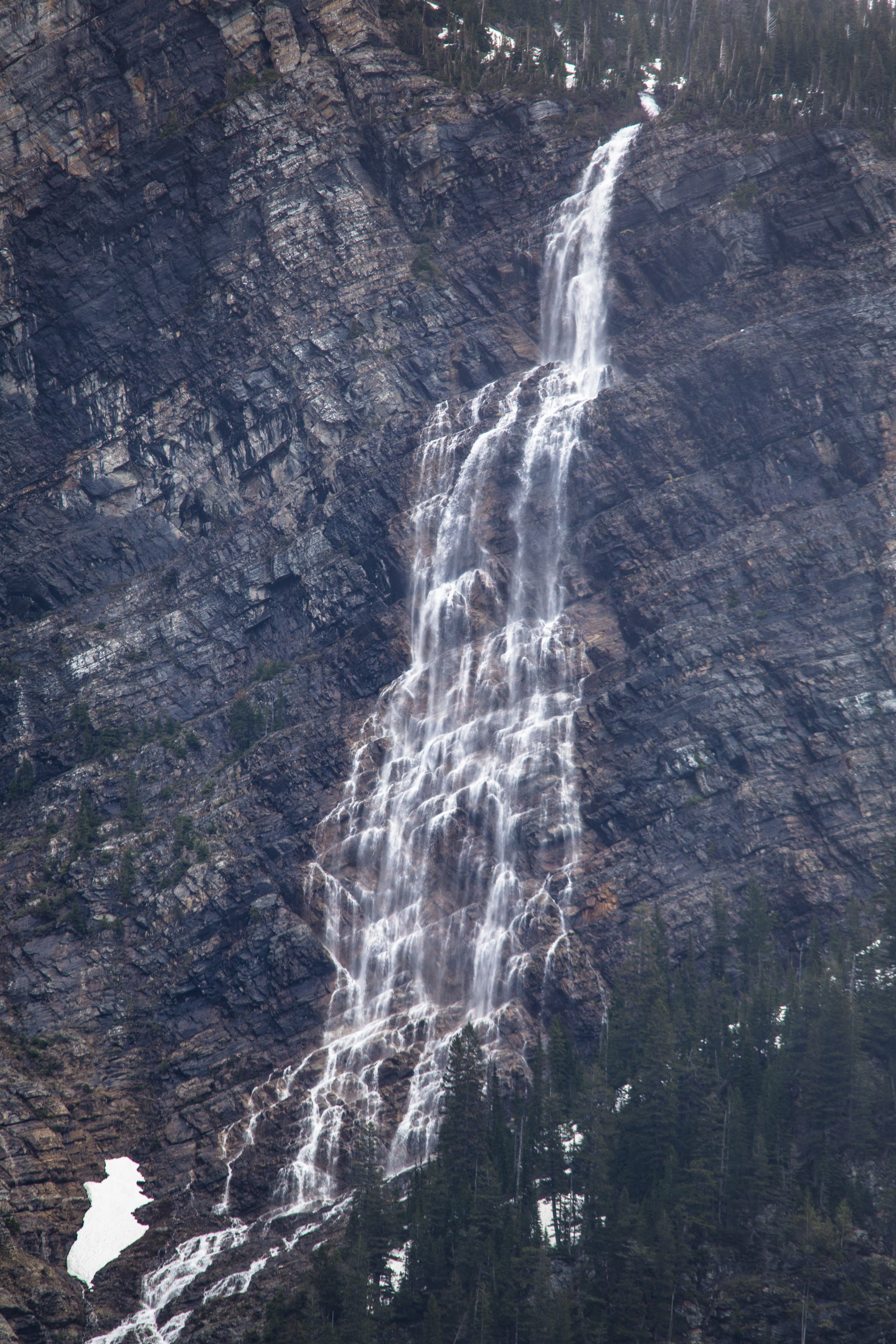

- Location within Montana
- Location: Glacier National Park (U.S.), Montana, U.S.
- Coordinates: 48°39′00″N 113°46′19″W
- Type: Fall
- Total height: 170 ft (52 m)

Monument Falls is a waterfall located in Glacier National Park, Montana, US. It descends from meltwater off Sperry Glacier en route to Avalanche Lake. Numerous other waterfalls are located in the immediate area, but they remain unnamed.

== Gallery ==
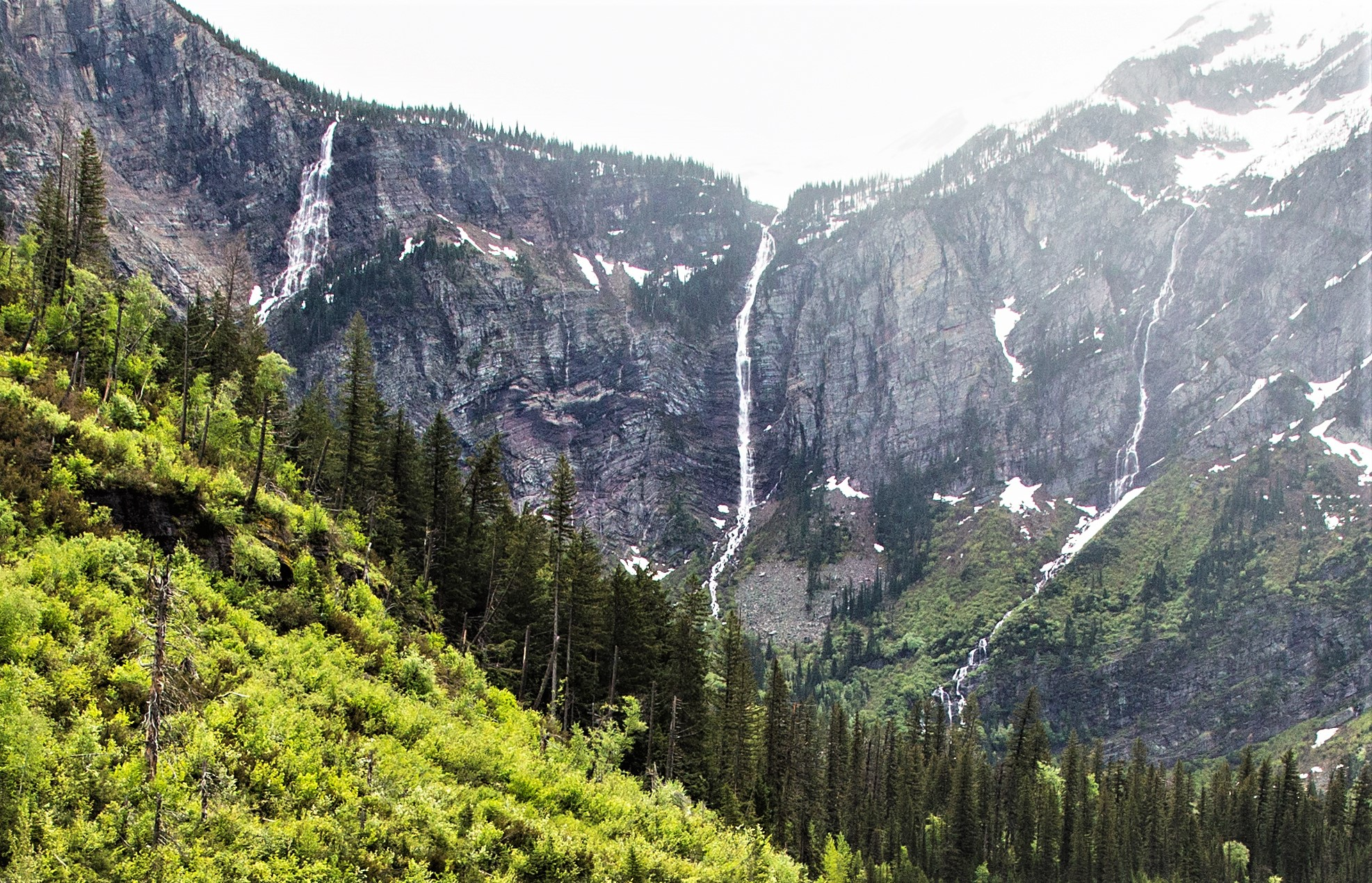

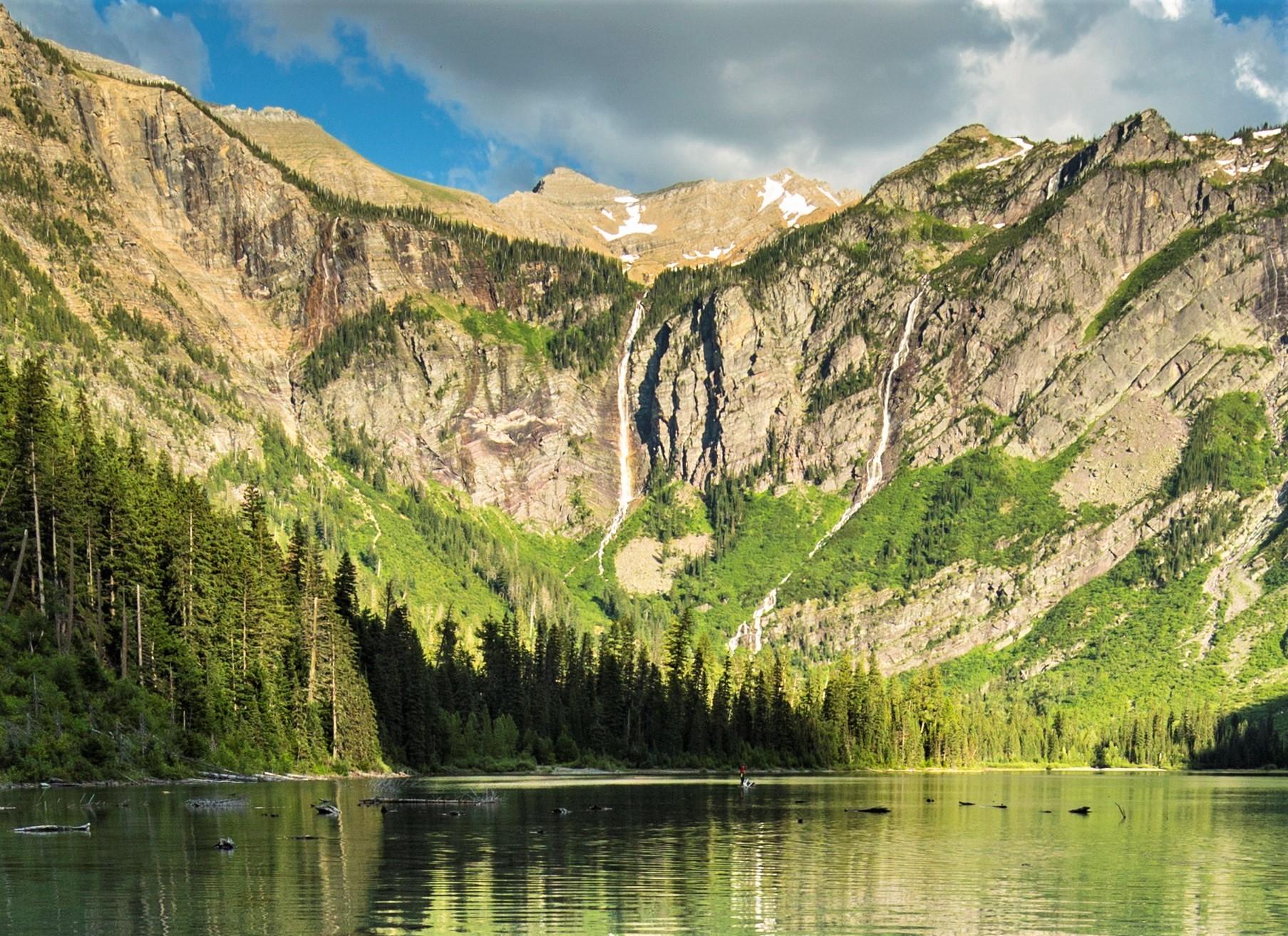

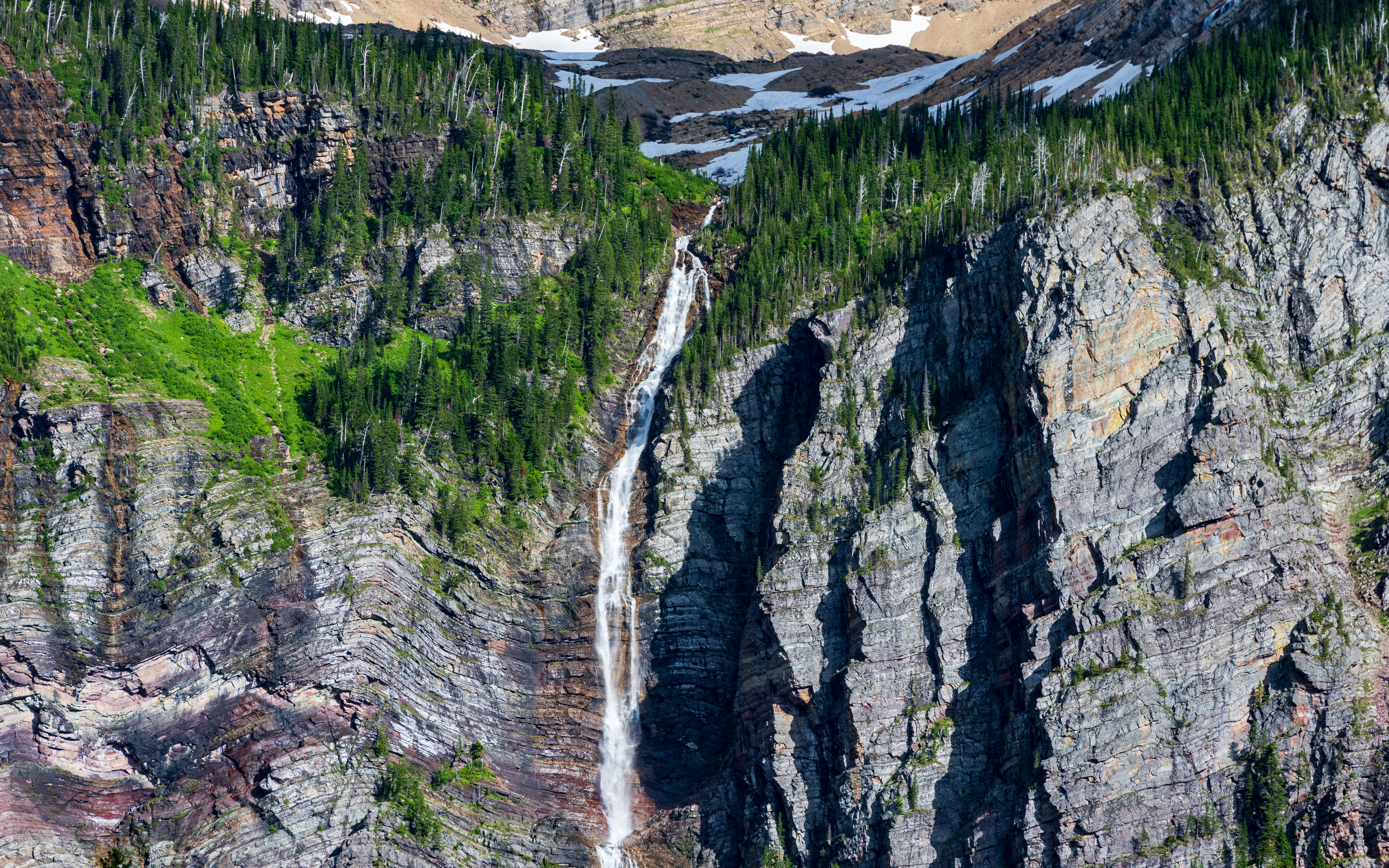
