= Double Falls (Montana) =

Waterfall in Lewis and Clark County, US

- Interactive map of Double Falls
- Location: Augusta, Montana
- Coordinates: 47.24248°N 112.43260°E
- Elevation: 5,999 ft (1,828 m)
- Number of drops: 2

Double Falls is waterfall in Lewis and Clark County, Montana near the CDP of Augusta. The river is part of Ford Creek and contains a campground and other amenities.

== Course ==
Double Falls is located on Ford Creek. After the waterfall, the creek flows east until Nilan Reservoir, where the creek flows south into Smith Creek.

== Waterfall ==
Double Falls contains two drops right next to each other. The waterfall is located at around 6,000 ft in the Lewis and Clark National Forrest outside of Augusta on Benchmark Road.

== Trail ==
From the Double Falls Trailhead, the falls is located .26 miles off the trail, and the recommended loop of the trail is 3 miles.
