= Mount Gould (Montana) =

Peak on the Continental Divide in Glacier National Park, Montana, United States

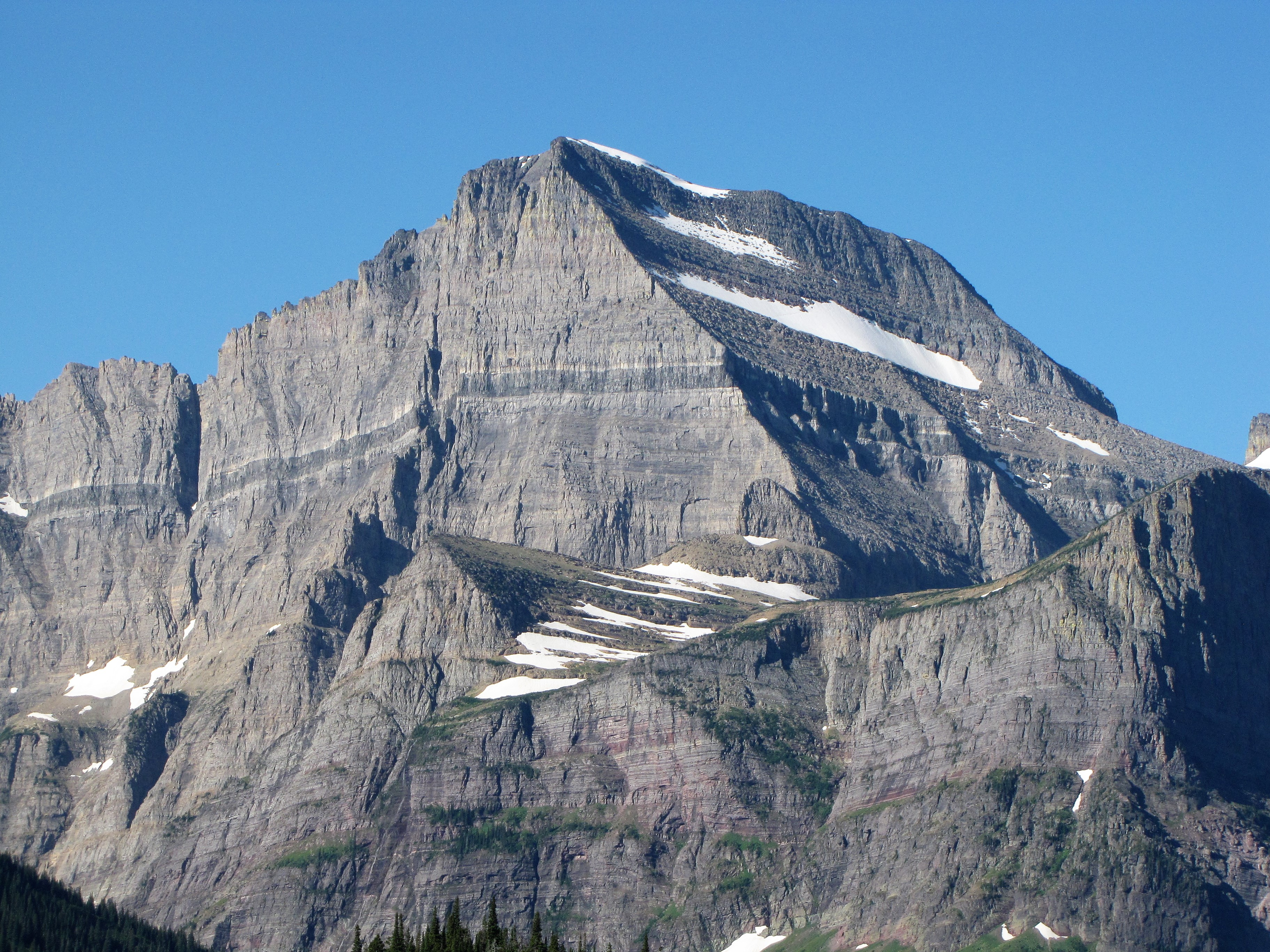
- Mount Gould with eastern cliff face

Highest point
- Elevation: 9,557 ft (2,913 m)
- Prominence: 1,953 ft (595 m)
- Parent peak: Mount Siyeh
- Isolation: 3.13 mi (5.04 km)
- Listing: Mountains in Glacier County, Montana
- Coordinates: 48°44′34″N 113°42′52″W

Geography
- Location within Montana
- Location: Glacier National Park, Montana, United States
- Parent range: Lewis Range
- Topo map: USGS Logan Pass

Geology
- Rock type(s): limestone, diorite

Climbing
- First ascent: 1920 by Frank B. Wynn, Harry R. Horn, Henry H. Goddard, and party
- Easiest route: West Face (scramble/Class 3)

Mount Gould (9,557 ft (2,913 m)) is a peak on the Continental Divide in Glacier National Park, Montana, United States. It is the highest point of the Garden Wall, a distinctive ridge of the Lewis Range. It is most notable for its huge, steep east face, which drops 4,000 ft (1,220 m) in only one-half mile (0.8 km). This face provides a backdrop to Grinnell Lake, and is often photographed.

Mount Gould was named in 1887 by George Bird Grinnell for his hunting companion, George H. Gould, and the name was officially adopted in 1929 by the United States Board on Geographic Names.

The first recorded ascent of Mount Gould was in 1920, by Frank B. Wynn, Harry R. Horn, Henry H. Goddard, and party. They used the West Face route, which is the easiest and most commonly used route today. It starts from the Highline Trail, which skirts the west side of the peak, and involves some rock scrambling but no technical climbing.

Climbing the sheer East Face of Mount Gould is theoretically possible; however the brittle, loose nature of the rock in Glacier National Park makes the ascent highly technical, unpleasant, and dangerous.

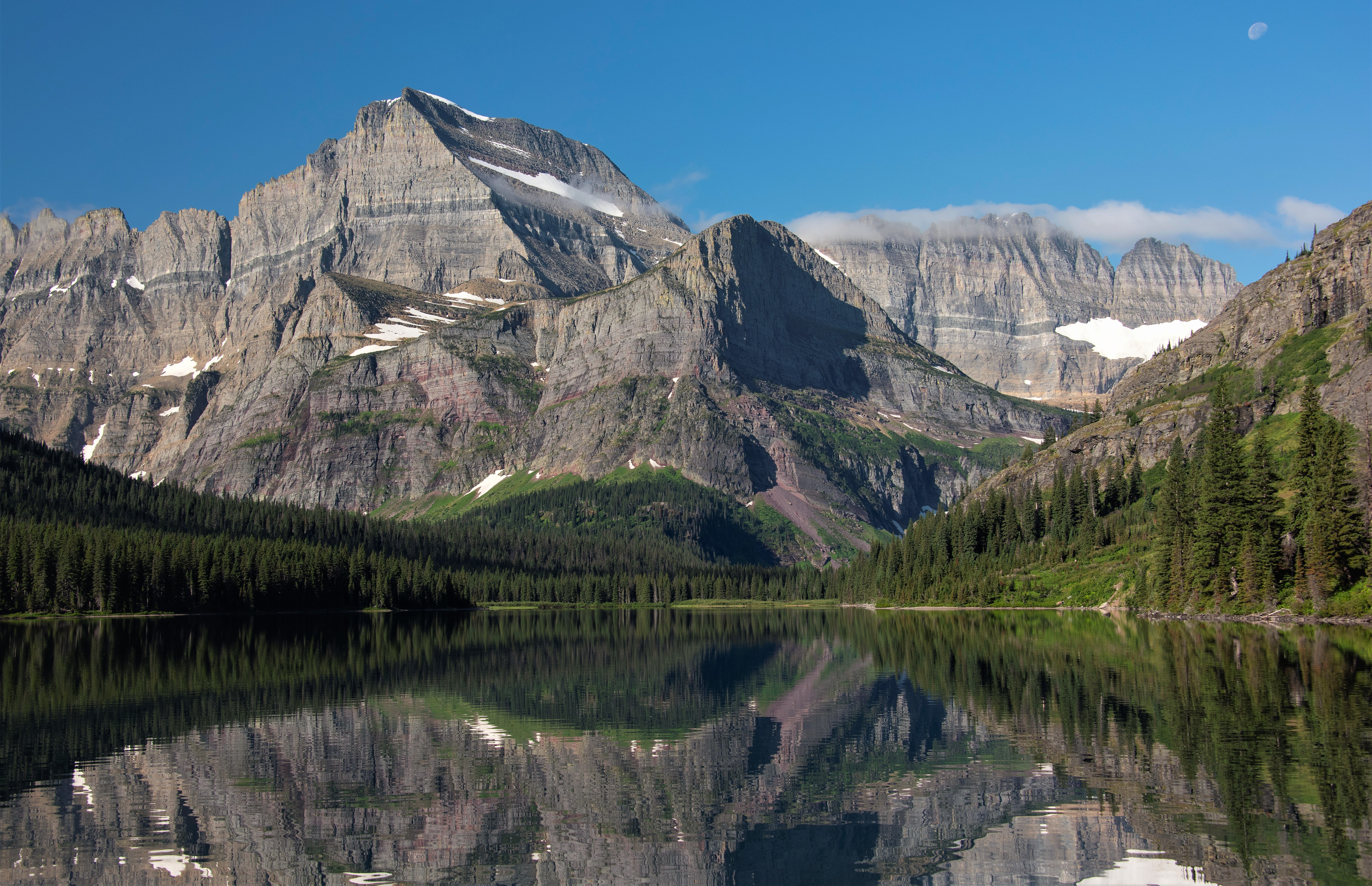
East face of Mount Gould and Angel Wing above Lake Josephine

== Climate ==
Based on the Köppen climate classification, Mount Gould is located in an alpine subarctic climate zone characterized by long, usually very cold winters, and short, cool to mild summers. Temperatures can drop below −10 °F with wind chill factors below −30 °F.

== Geology ==
Like the mountains in Glacier National Park, Mount Gould is composed of sedimentary rock laid down during the Precambrian to Jurassic periods. Formed in shallow seas, this sedimentary rock was initially uplifted beginning 170 million years ago when the Lewis Overthrust fault pushed an enormous slab of precambrian rocks 3 mi (4.8 km) thick, 50 miles (80 km) wide and 160 miles (260 km) long over younger rock of the cretaceous period. The bulk of the peak is composed of limestone of the Siyeh Formation, and the conspicuous dark band on the east face is a diorite sill.

== See also ==
- List of mountains and mountain ranges of Glacier National Park (U.S.)

== Sources ==
- J. Gordon Edwards and Josephine Gould, A Climber's Guide to Glacier National Park, Falcon Press, 1991. ISBN 0-87842-177-7.
