= Dragon's Tail =

Dragon's Tail, dragon tail, etc. may refer to the tail of a dragon.

Dragon's Tail may also refer to:

== Astronomy ==
- Dragon's Tail (lunar) (Latin: Cauda Draconis;), an alternate name for the descending lunar node in astronomy and astrology
  - Ketu (mythology), the personification of the descending lunar node in Hindu astronomy, astrology, and religion
- Dragon's Tail (Chinese constellation), another name of the Chinese mansion Tail (near Scorpio) in the constellation of the Azure Dragon
- Dragon's Tail (star), another name for Thuban in the constellation Draco, which was the pole star from 3942 to 1793 BC

== Places ==
- Dragon's Tail (peninsula), a phantom feature appearing east of the Golden Chersonese in Ptolemaic and Islamic maps for centuries
- Yongmunso, Korea, a site supposedly dug by a dragon's tail
- Mokoliʻi, Hawaiʻi, USA, supposedly the remains of a dragon or lizard's tail
- Kontuey Neak (Khmer for "Dragon Tail"), a Cambodian rain forest
- Bạch Long Vĩ island (Vietnamese for "White Dragon Tail"), a Vietnamese island
- Dragons Tail, a ridge near Bearhat Mountain in Montana, United States
- The Dragon's Tail (road), an informal name for a winding stretch of U.S. Route 129 in North Carolina and Tennessee
- The Dragon's Tail (trail), a winding stretch of the Forest of Dean in Gloucester in the United Kingdom
- "The Dragon's Tail", an occasional name for the Strait of Magellan

== Other ==
- Dragon's tail fern (Asplenium × ebenoides)
- Dragon's Tail (tincture), an alternate name for the tincture sanguine
- "A Dragon's Tail" (episode) (2006), an episode of the Jane and the Dragon television series
- A Dragon's Tail (2008), a book in the Jane and the Dragon series of books by Martin Baynton
- "Dragon's Tail" (episode) (2006), an episode of GoGo Sentai Boukenger
- The Dragon's Tail (play), a 1985 play by Douglas Watkinson
- Dragon's Tail, a type of food served at the annual Christmas Feast of the king's court in Farmer Giles of Ham, a mock medieval fable by J.R.R. Tolkien
- Dragon's Tail, a set of speed slides at Six Flags White Water in Atlanta, Georgia, in the United States

== See also ==
- Mission Incredible: Adventures on the Dragon's Trail (2012), a movie in the Pleasant Goat and Big Big Wolf series
- Under the Dragon's Tail (book) (1998), a novel in Maureen Jennings's Detective Murdoch series
- Under the Dragon's Tail (film) (2005), a film adaptation of Jenning's book
- "Biting the Dragon's Tail" (1995), a single by Jonathan Saul Kane
- Tickling the Dragon's Tail, a 1946 failed experiment to test the exact point at which fissile material could be made critical, after which hands-on criticality experiments were discontinued in the United States
- Chasing the Dragon’s Tail (1991), a book by Alan Rabinowitz about saving wild cats in Thailand
- Fuxi and Nüwa, figures in Chinese mythology often depicted as jiaolong with dragon or serpent tails instead of legs
- Ouroboros, the serpent or dragon which devours its own tail
- Pistis Sophia, a Gnostic text
- "Ode on Melancholy" (1819), a poem by John Keats
