= Reynolds Mountain =

Mountain in the state of Montana

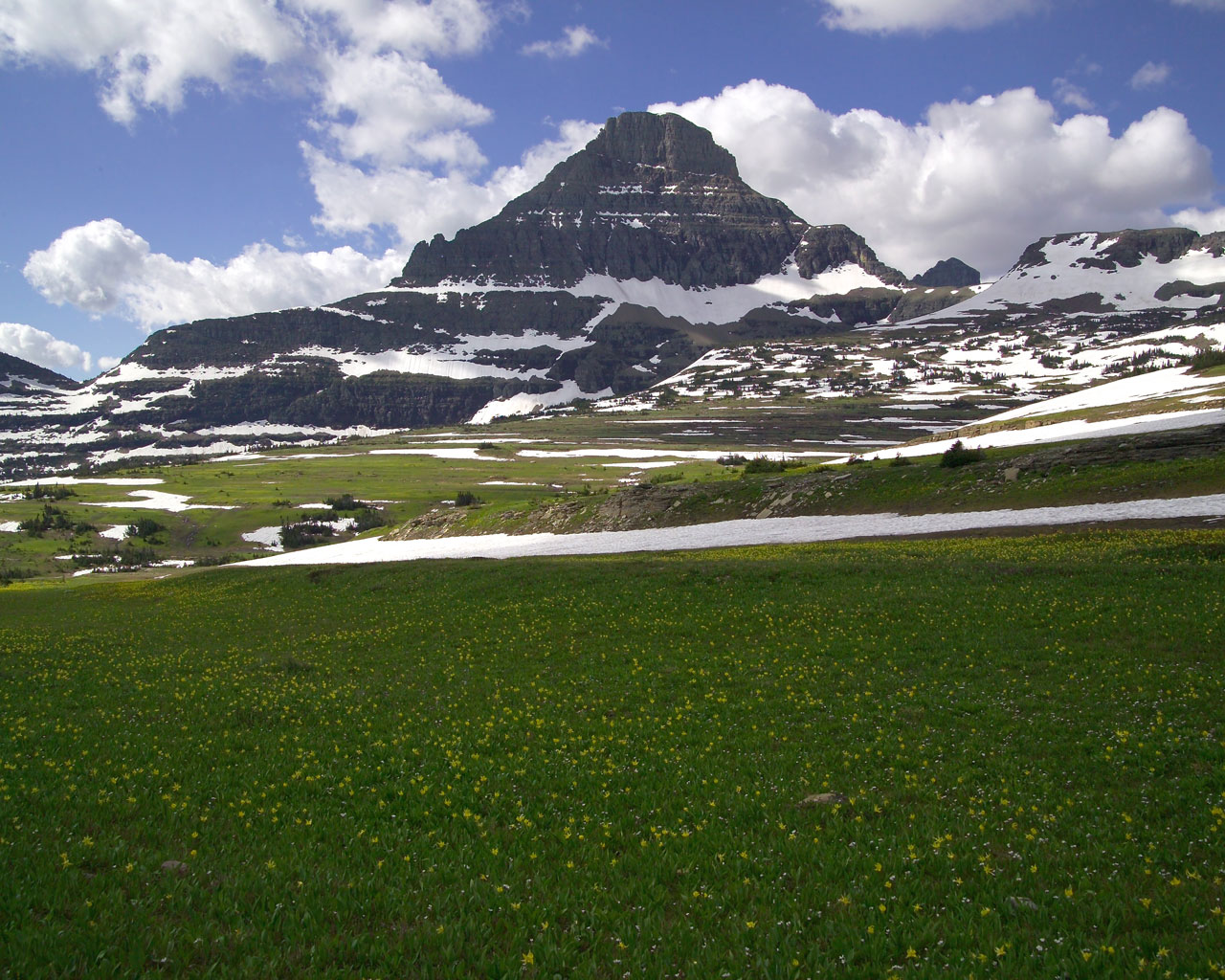
- Reynolds Mountain as seen from Logan Pass

Highest point
- Elevation: 9,130 ft (2,780 m)
- Prominence: 1,285 ft (392 m)
- Coordinates: 48°40′19″N 113°43′24″W

Geography
- Location within Montana Location within the United States
- Location: Flathead County, Montana, Glacier County, Montana, U.S.
- Parent range: Lewis Range
- Topo map(s): USGS Logan Pass, MT

Reynolds Mountain (9,125 feet (2,781 m)) is located in the Lewis Range, Glacier National Park in the U.S. state of Montana. Reynolds Mountain is situated along the Continental Divide and is easily seen from Logan Pass by looking due south from the pass. Hidden Lake is located below Reynolds Mountain to the west. Reynolds is a class 2(3) climb via the southwestern talus slope route that allows many people to easily climb the peak. The mountain was named for Charles E. Reynolds, a writer for Forest and Stream magazine, and assistant to the magazine's editor, George Bird Grinnell, who named many of the features in Glacier National Park. The mountain's name was officially adopted in 1910 by the U.S. Board on Geographic Names.

== Geology ==
Like other mountains in Glacier National Park, Reynolds Mountain is composed of sedimentary rock laid down during the Precambrian to Jurassic periods. Formed in shallow seas, this sedimentary rock was initially uplifted beginning 170 million years ago when the Lewis Overthrust fault pushed an enormous slab of precambrian rocks 3 mi (4.8 km) thick, 50 miles (80 km) wide and 160 miles (260 km) long over younger rock of the cretaceous period.

== Gallery ==
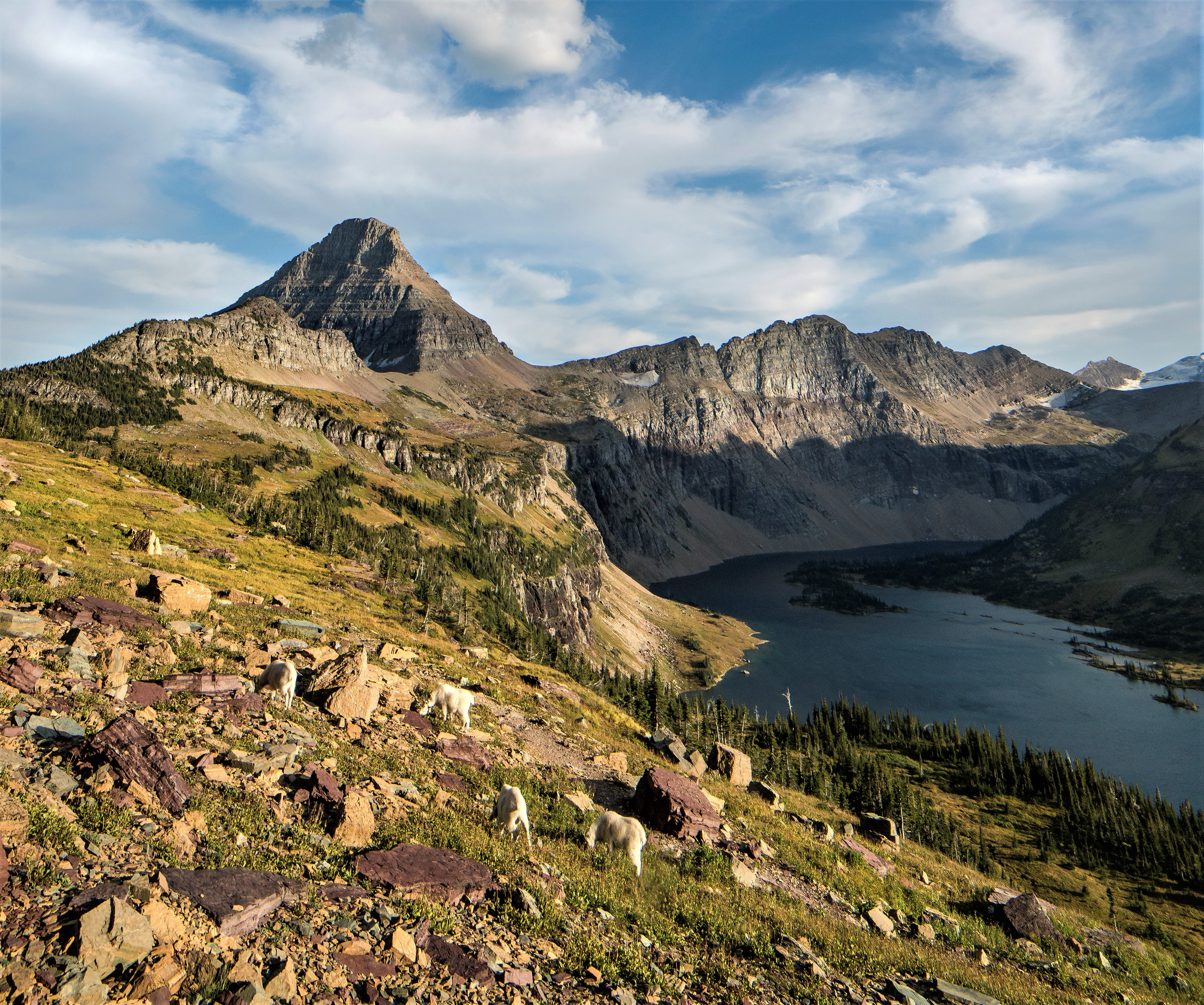
Reynolds Mountain (left) and Dragons Tail (right) above Hidden Lake

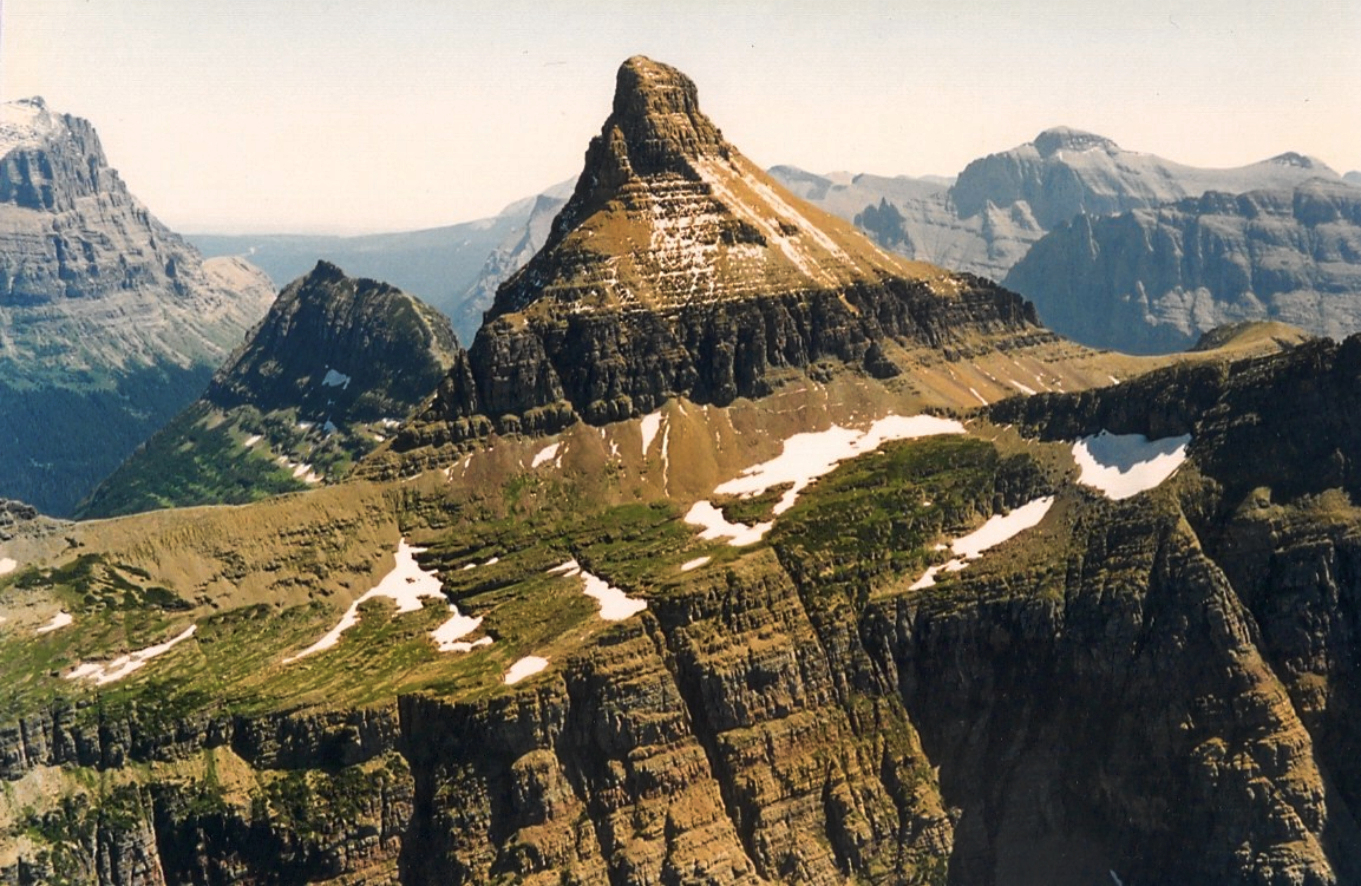
Reynolds Mountain is a classic horn, seen here from Bearhat Mountain

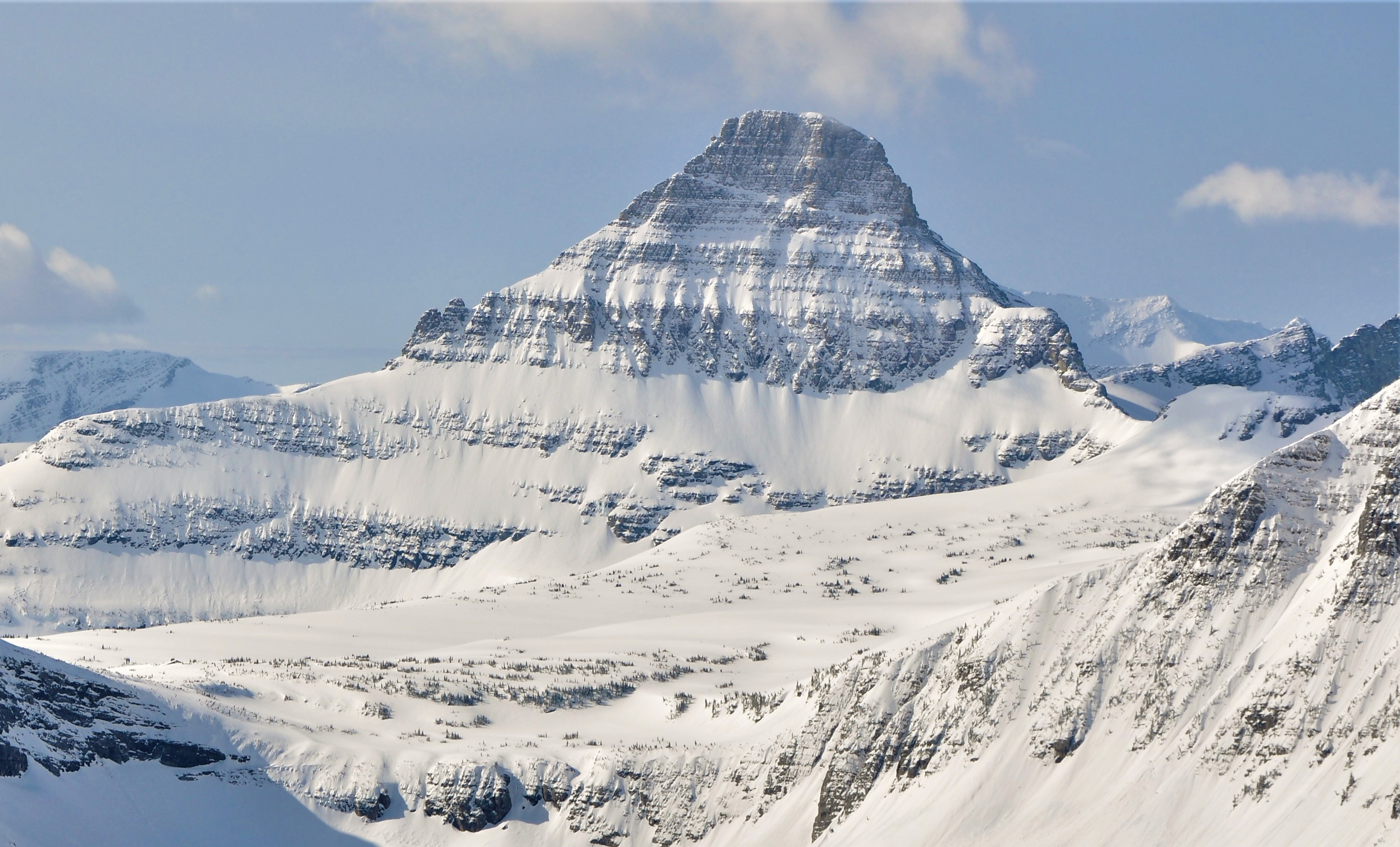
North face

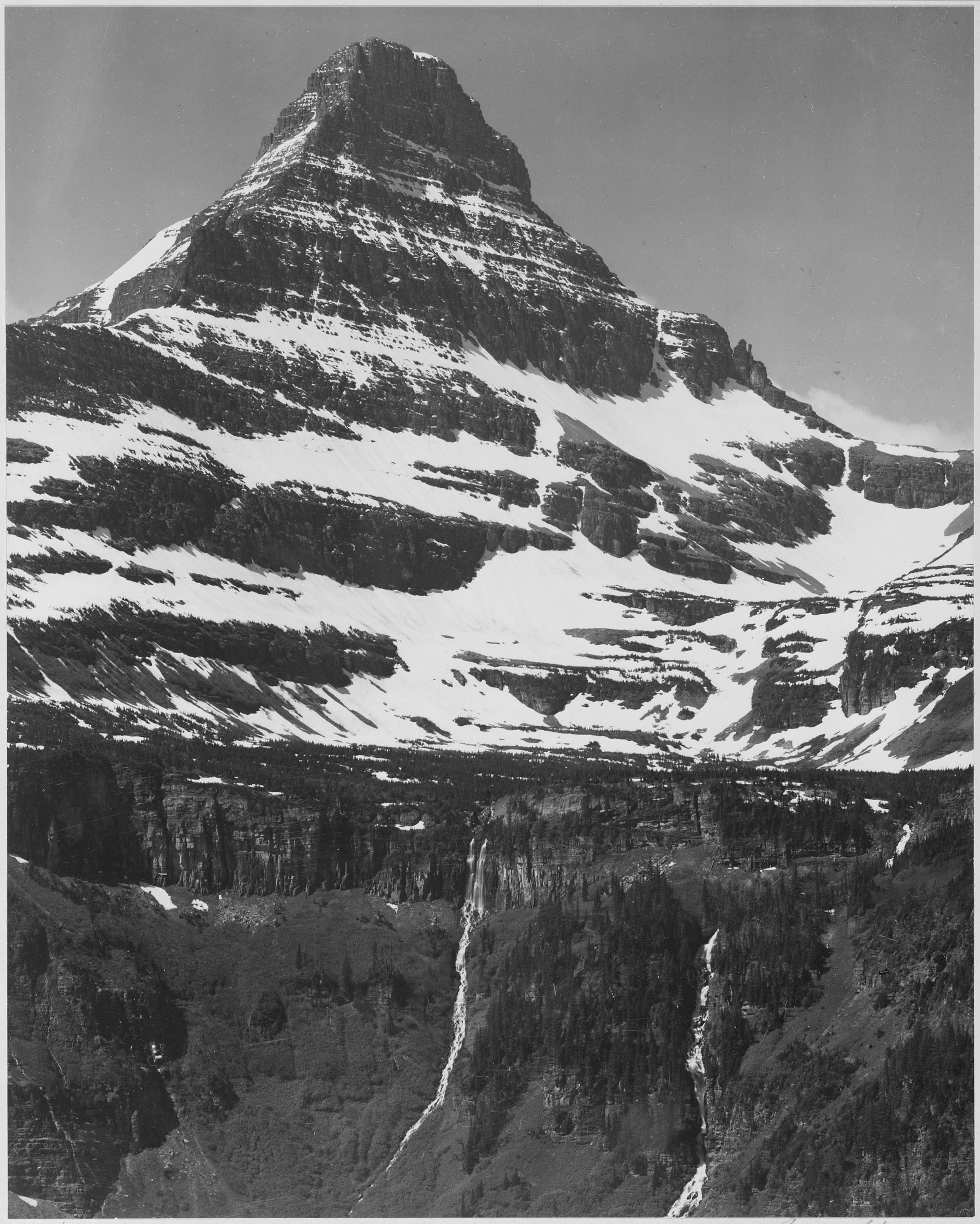
Reynolds Mountain by Ansel Adams in 1942

== See also ==
- Mountains and mountain ranges of Glacier National Park (U.S.)
- Geology of the Rocky Mountains
