= Clements Mountain =

Mountain in Glacier National Park, Montana, United States

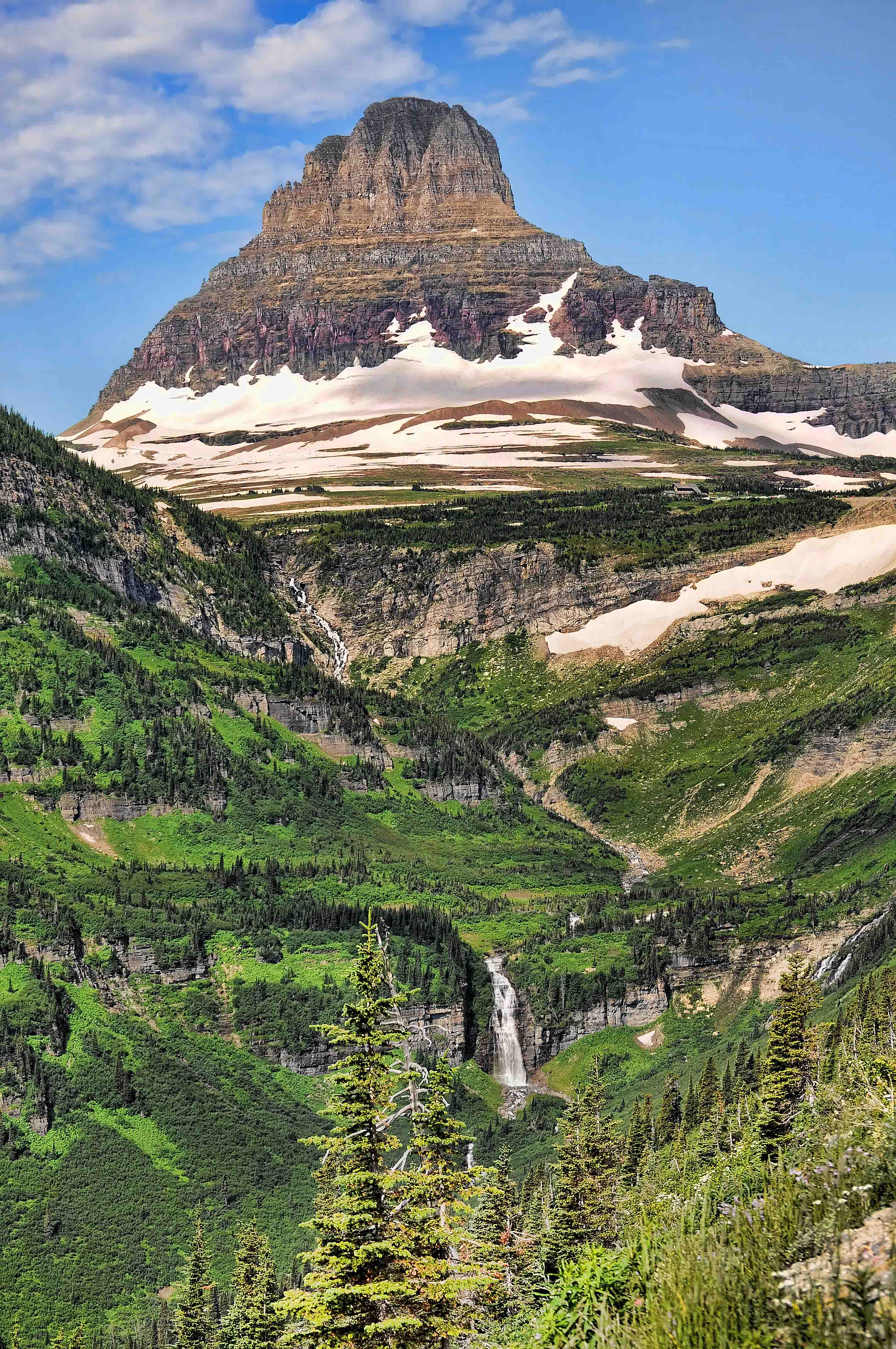
- Clements Mountain

Highest point
- Elevation: 8,765 ft (2,672 m) NAVD 88
- Prominence: 920 ft (280 m)
- Listing: Mountains of Glacier National Park
- Coordinates: 48°41′35″N 113°44′25″W

Geography
- Location within Montana Location within the United States
- Location: Glacier County, Montana, Flathead County, Montana, U.S.
- Parent range: Lewis Range
- Topo map(s): USGS Logan Pass, MT

Climbing
- First ascent: August 13, 1923 (Norman Clyde)

Clements Mountain (8,765 feet (2,672 m)) is located in the Lewis Range, Glacier National Park in the U.S. state of Montana. Clements Mountain rises to the west of Logan Pass and above the Hidden Lake Trail which leads to Hidden Lake just west of the continental divide. The peak was named after Walter M. Clements who had worked to set up a treaty between the Blackfeet and the U.S. Government for the purchase of tribal lands east of the continental divide which later became part of the park.

== Geology ==
Like other mountains in Glacier National Park, Clements Mountain is composed of sedimentary rock laid down during the Precambrian to Jurassic periods. Formed in shallow seas, this sedimentary rock was initially uplifted beginning 170 million years ago when the Lewis Overthrust fault pushed an enormous slab of precambrian rocks 3 mi (4.8 km) thick, 50 miles (80 km) wide and 160 miles (260 km) long over younger rock of the cretaceous period.

== Climate ==
Based on the Köppen climate classification, the peak is located in an alpine subarctic climate zone with long, cold, snowy winters, and cool to warm summers. Temperatures can drop below −10 °F with wind chill factors below −30 °F.

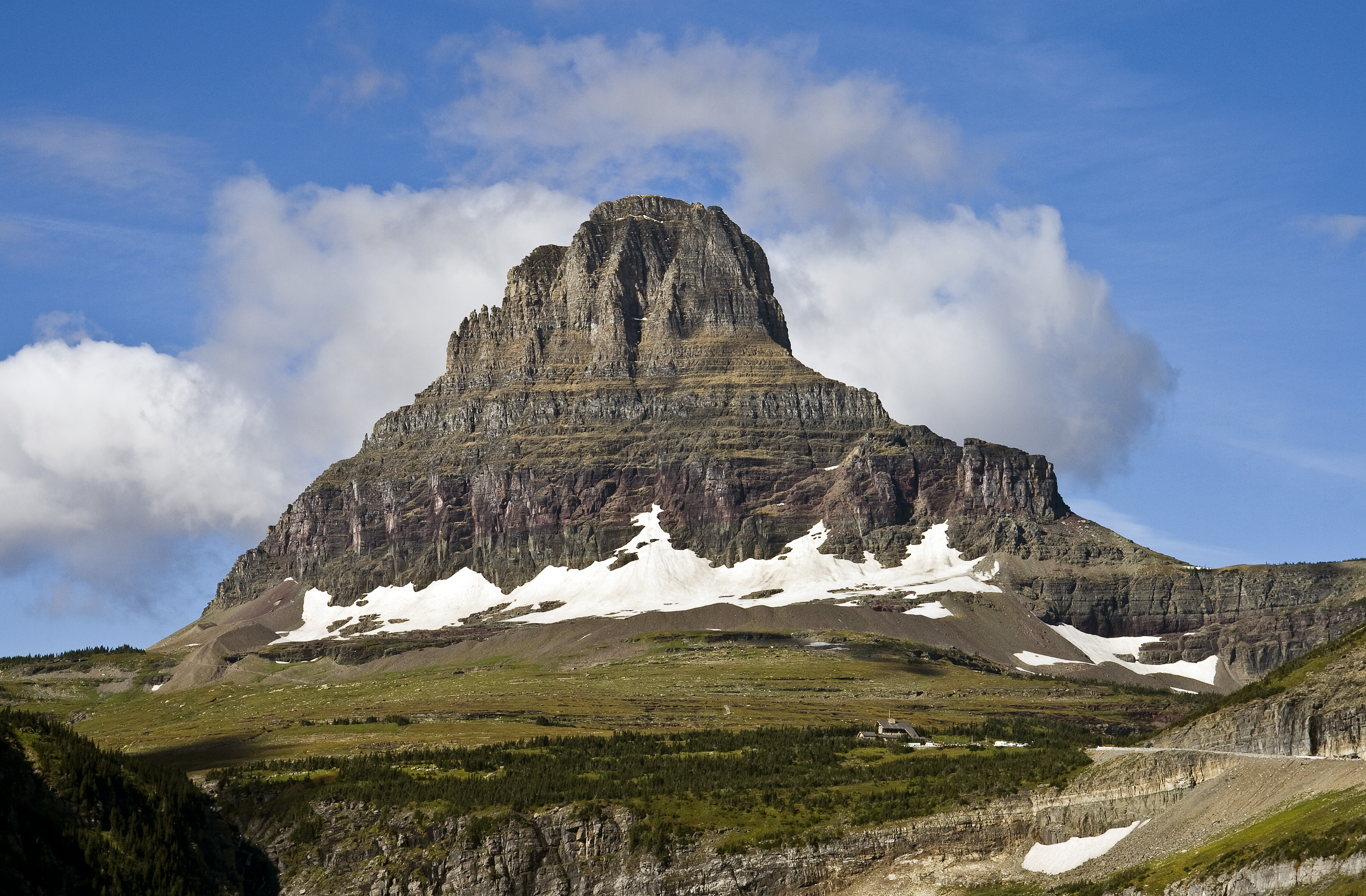
Clements Mountain with Going-to-the-Sun Road at right winding up to Logan Pass Visitor Center

== See also ==
- Geology of the Rocky Mountains
