= Hidden Lake (Flathead County, Montana) =

Lake in Montana, United States

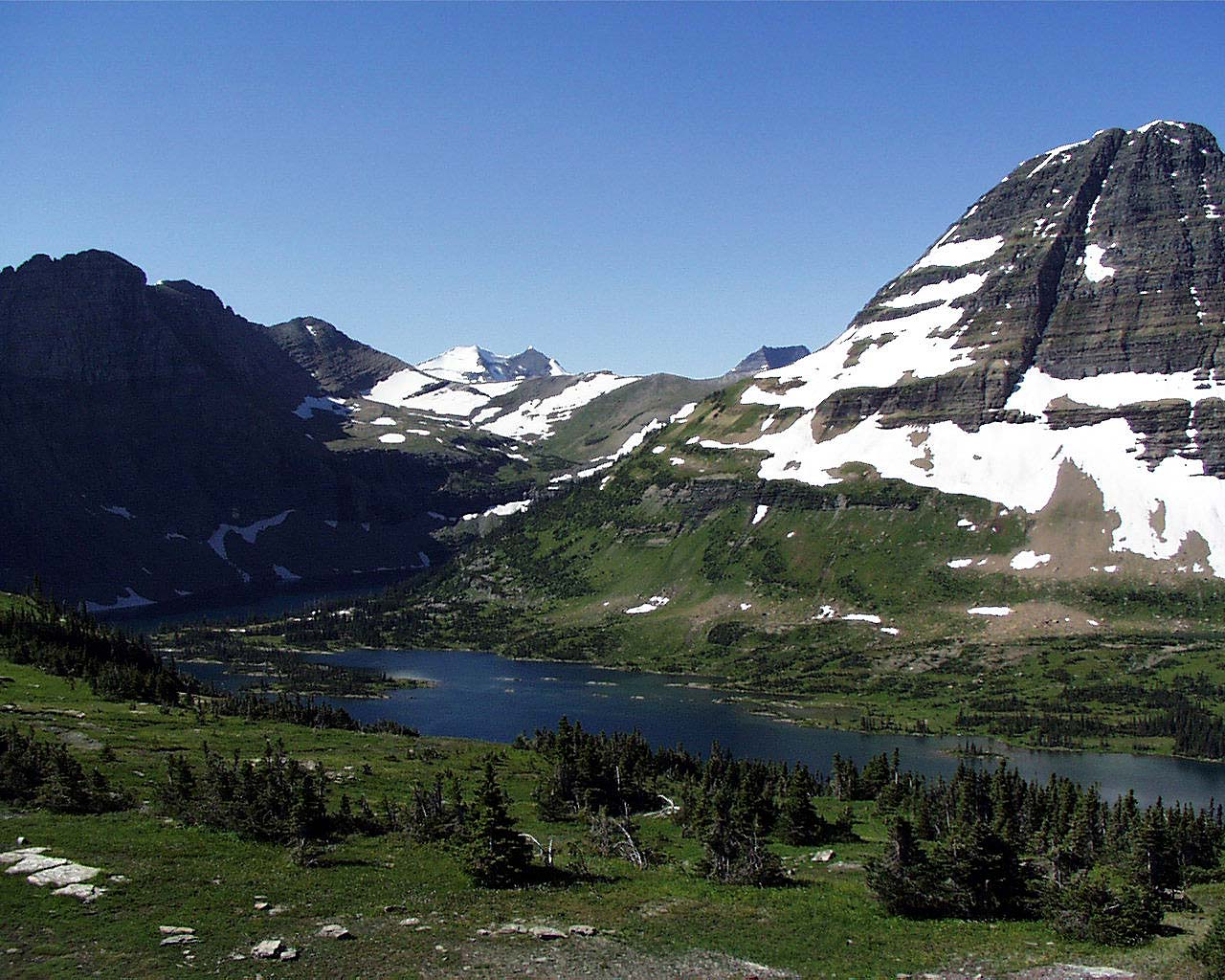
- Hidden Lake from the Hidden Lake overlook. Bearhat Mountain rises above the lake at right.

- Location within Montana Location within the United States
- Location: Glacier National Park, Flathead County, Montana, US
- Coordinates: 48°40′35″N 113°44′29″W
- Lake type: Natural
- Primary outflows: Hidden Creek
- Basin countries: United States
- Max. length: 2 mi (3.2 km)
- Max. width: .40 mi (0.64 km)
- Surface elevation: 6,375 ft (1,943 m)

Hidden Lake is located in Glacier National Park, in the U.S. state of Montana. The lake is surrounded by several peaks, including Bearhat Mountain to the southwest, Dragons Tail to the south, Clements Mountain to the north, and Reynolds Mountain to the east. It is a popular destination for hikers, with the Hidden Lake Overlook Trail leading to the lake.

== Location and Features ==
Hidden Lake is situated in Glacier National Park, Flathead County, Montana, US. The lake is 1.4 miles (2.25 km) long and 0.40 miles (0.64 km) wide, with a surface elevation of 6,375 feet (1,943 m). The primary outflow from the lake is Hidden Creek.

== Hidden Lake Overlook Trail ==
The Hidden Lake Overlook Trail is a 2.7-mile out-and-back trail that provides visitors an opportunity to experience the beauty of Hidden Lake. The trail starts at the Logan Pass Visitor Center and is suitable for individuals of all fitness levels. As the trail ascends in elevation, hikers are treated to mesmerizing views of the landscape, including a meadow known as the Hanging Gardens where wildflowers bloom and wildlife is abundant.

=== Wildlife ===
Hidden Lake Overlook Trail offers a diverse range of wildlife. The trail serves as a migration route for several wild creatures. Mountain goats and bighorn sheep are commonly spotted along the trail. Bears also frequent this area, and hikers are advised to be vigilant when they come across signs of bear activity such as claw marks or footprints.

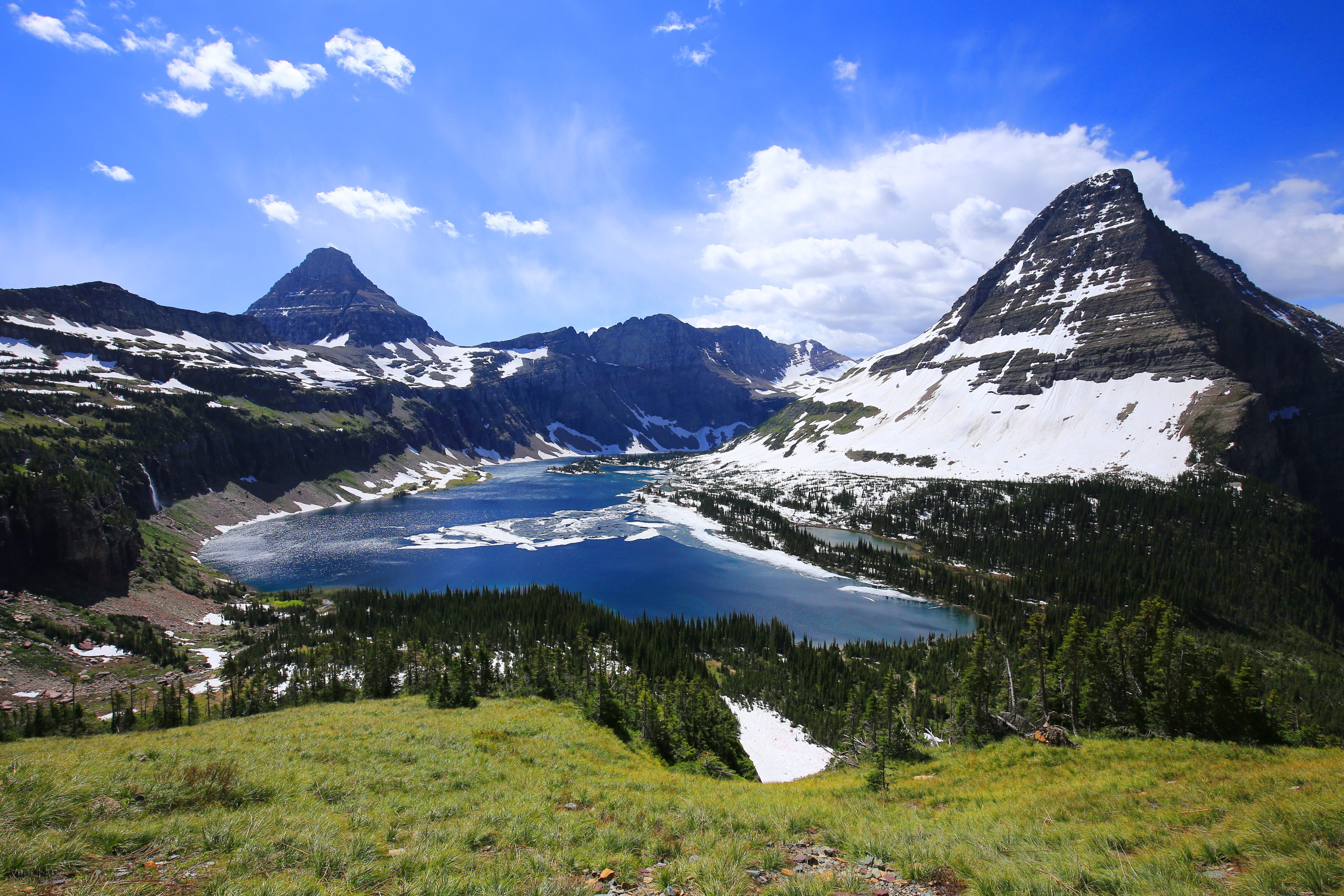
Hidden Lake, with Reynolds Mountain at left, Dragons Tail centered, and Bearhat Mountain at right

== See also ==
- List of lakes in Flathead County, Montana (A-L)
