= Dragons Tail (Montana) =

Ridge in Montana, United States

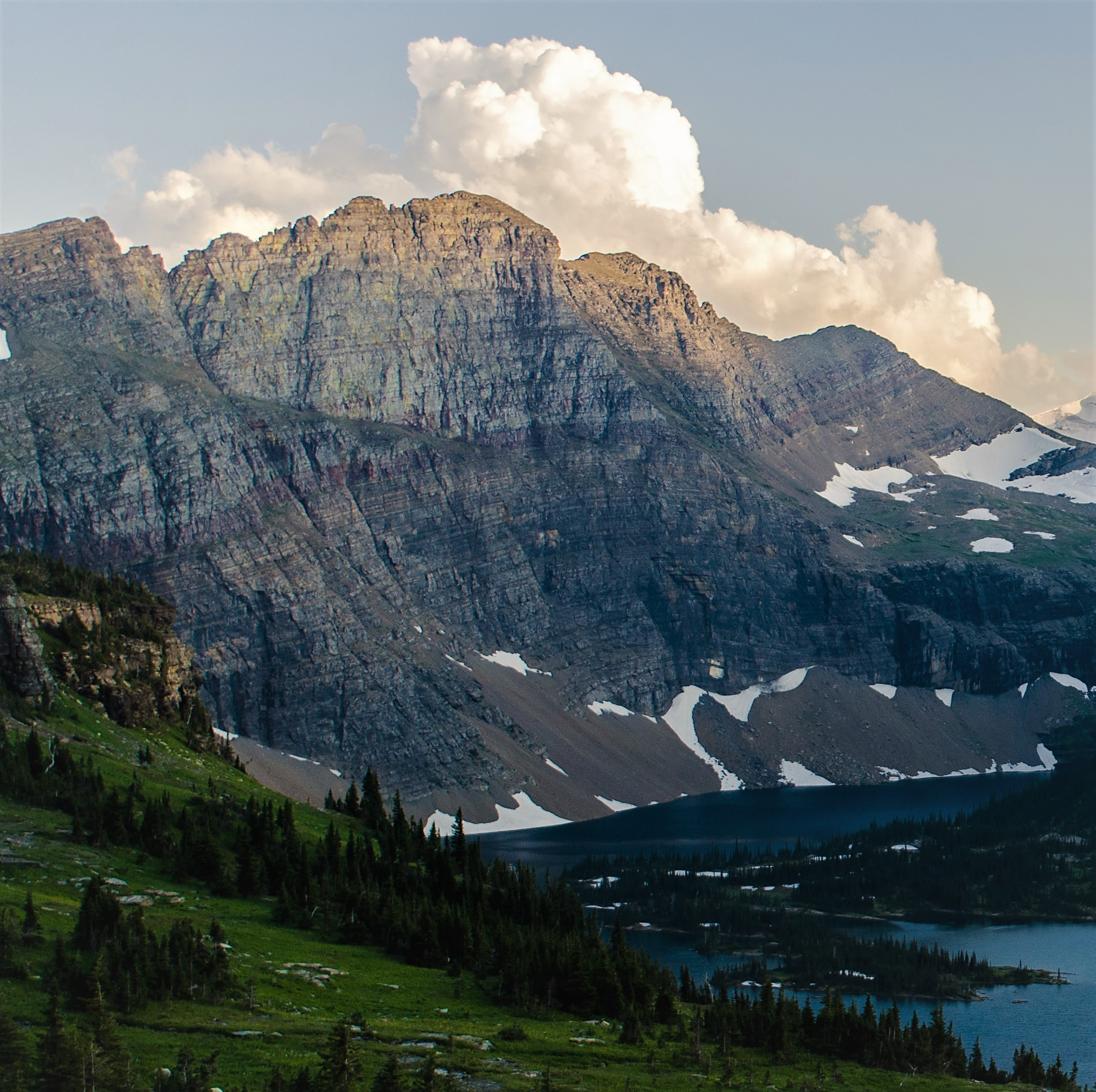
- Dragons Tail, north aspect

Highest point
- Elevation: 8,580 ft (2,615 m)
- Prominence: 660 ft (200 m)
- Parent peak: Bearhat Mountain (8,689 ft)
- Isolation: 1.25 mi (2.01 km)
- Coordinates: 48°39′25″N 113°44′27″W

Geography
- Location within Montana Location within the United States
- Location: Glacier National Park; Flathead County / Glacier County; Montana, U.S.
- Parent range: Lewis Range
- Topo map: USGS Logan Pass

Geology
- Rock type: Sedimentary rock

Climbing
- Easiest route: class 3

The Dragons Tail is an 8,580-foot (2,620-meter) elevation ridge located in the Lewis Range, of Glacier National Park in the U.S. state of Montana. It is situated on the Continental Divide, on the border shared by Flathead County and Glacier County. Topographic relief is significant as the north aspect rises 2,200 feet (670 meters) above Hidden Lake in one-half mile, and the west aspect rises nearly 4,700 feet (1,400 meters) above Avalanche Lake in two miles. It can be seen from the Hidden Lake overlook along with its nearest higher neighbor, Bearhat Mountain, 1.27 miles (2.04 km) to the northwest.

== Climate ==
Based on the Köppen climate classification, Dragons Tail is located in an alpine subarctic climate zone with long, cold, snowy winters, and cool to warm summers. Temperatures can drop below −10 °F with wind chill factors below −30 °F. Precipitation runoff from the west side of the ridge drains into creeks which empty into Lake McDonald, and the east side drains into the St. Mary River.

== Geology ==
Like other mountains in Glacier National Park, Dragons Tail is composed of sedimentary rock laid down during the Precambrian to Jurassic periods. Formed in shallow seas, this sedimentary rock was initially uplifted beginning 170 million years ago when the Lewis Overthrust fault pushed an enormous slab of precambrian rocks 3 mi (4.8 km) thick, 50 miles (80 km) wide and 160 miles (260 km) long over younger rock of the cretaceous period.

== Gallery ==
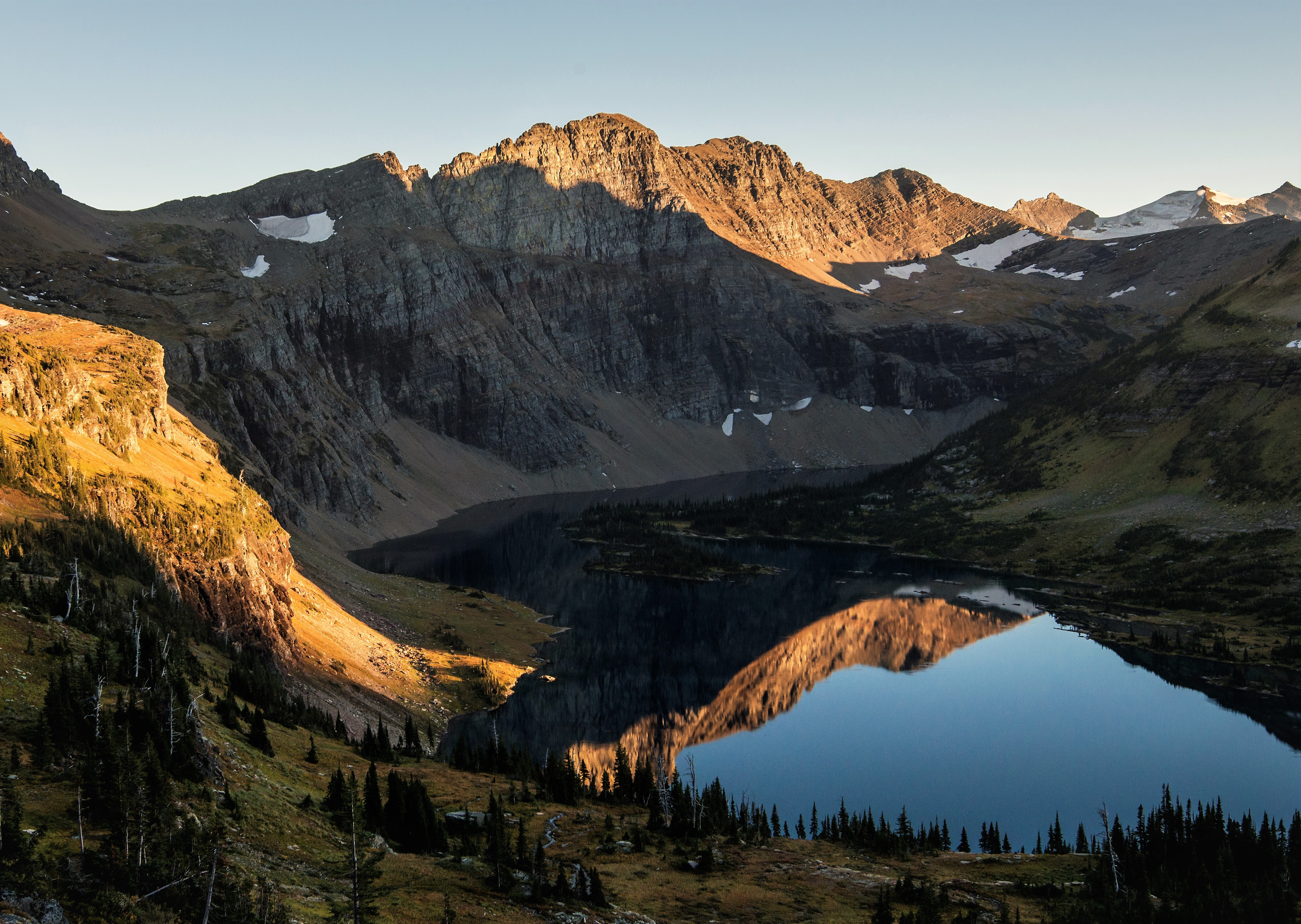
Dragons Tail reflected in Hidden Lake

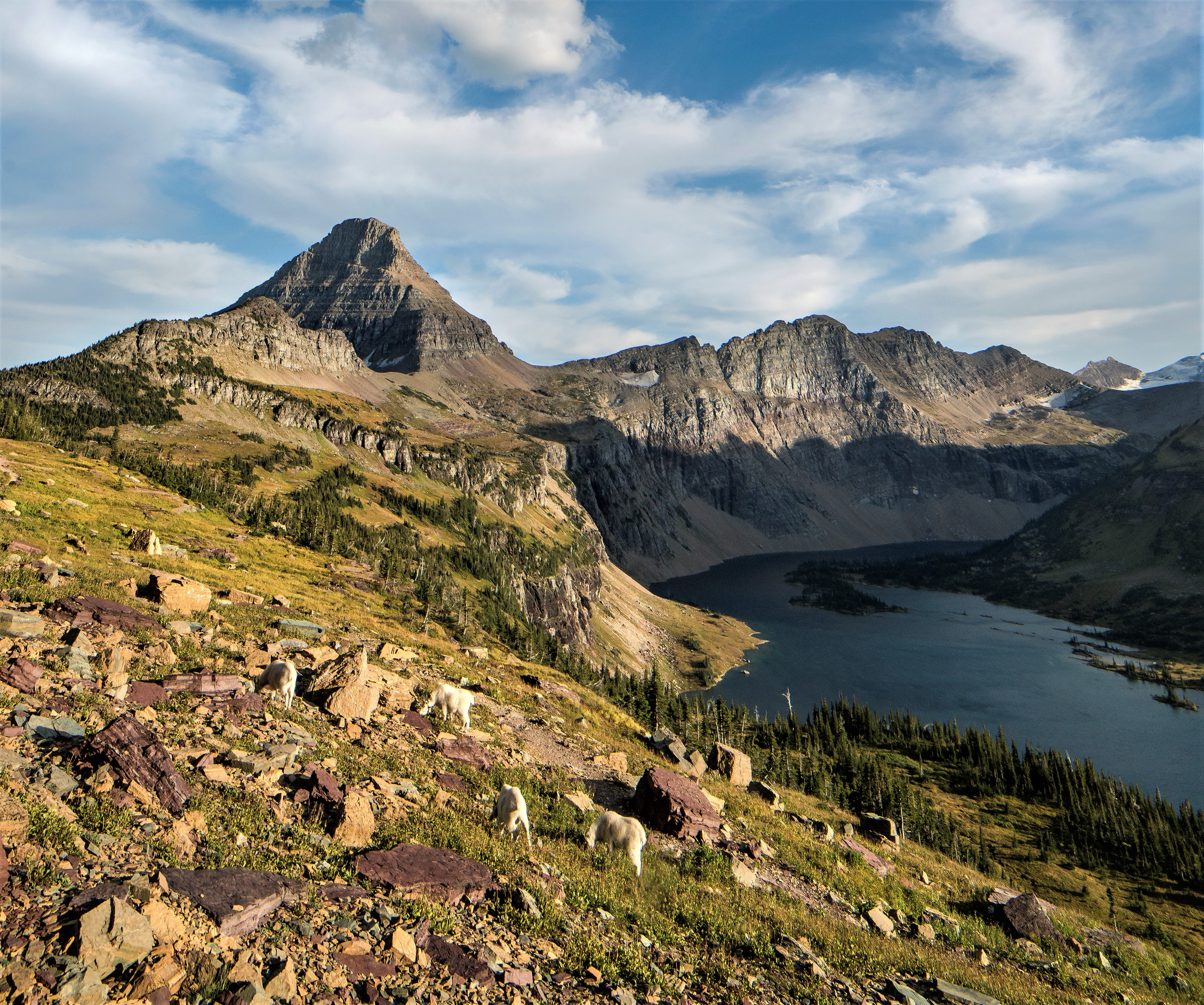
Reynolds Mountain (left) and Dragons Tail (right)

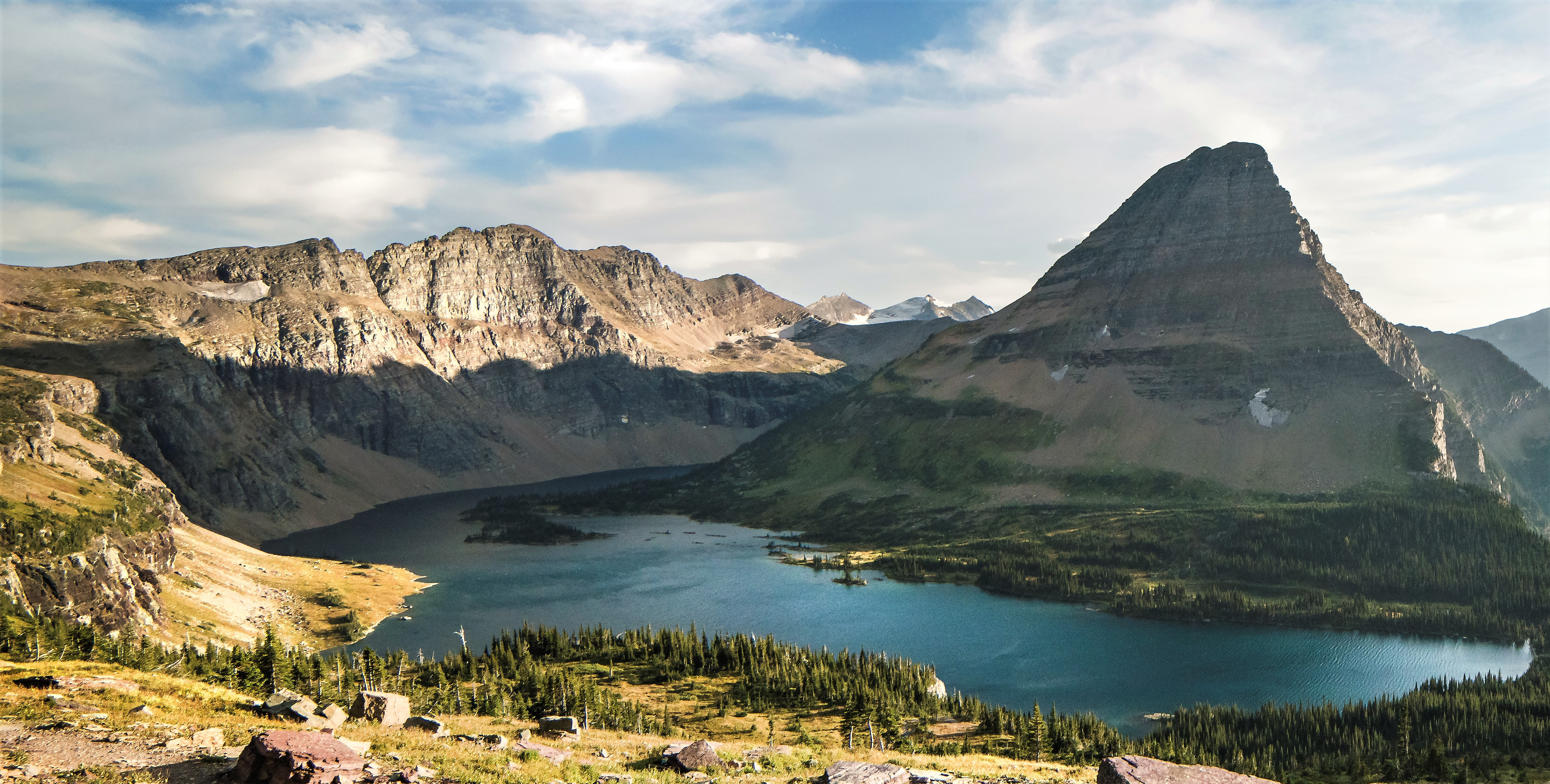
Dragons Tail, Hidden Lake, and Bearhat Mountain (right)

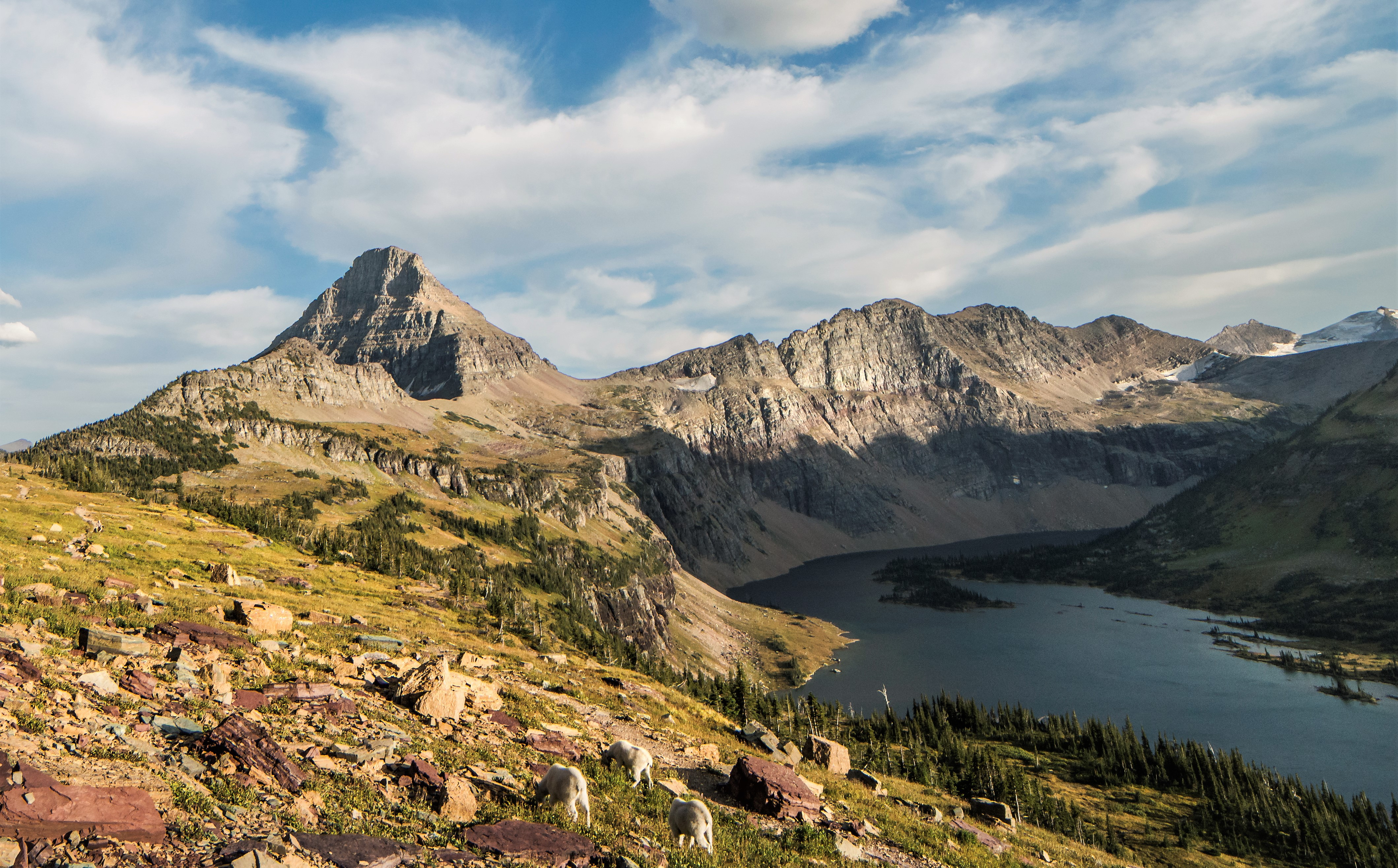
Reynolds Mountain (left) and Dragons Tail (right)

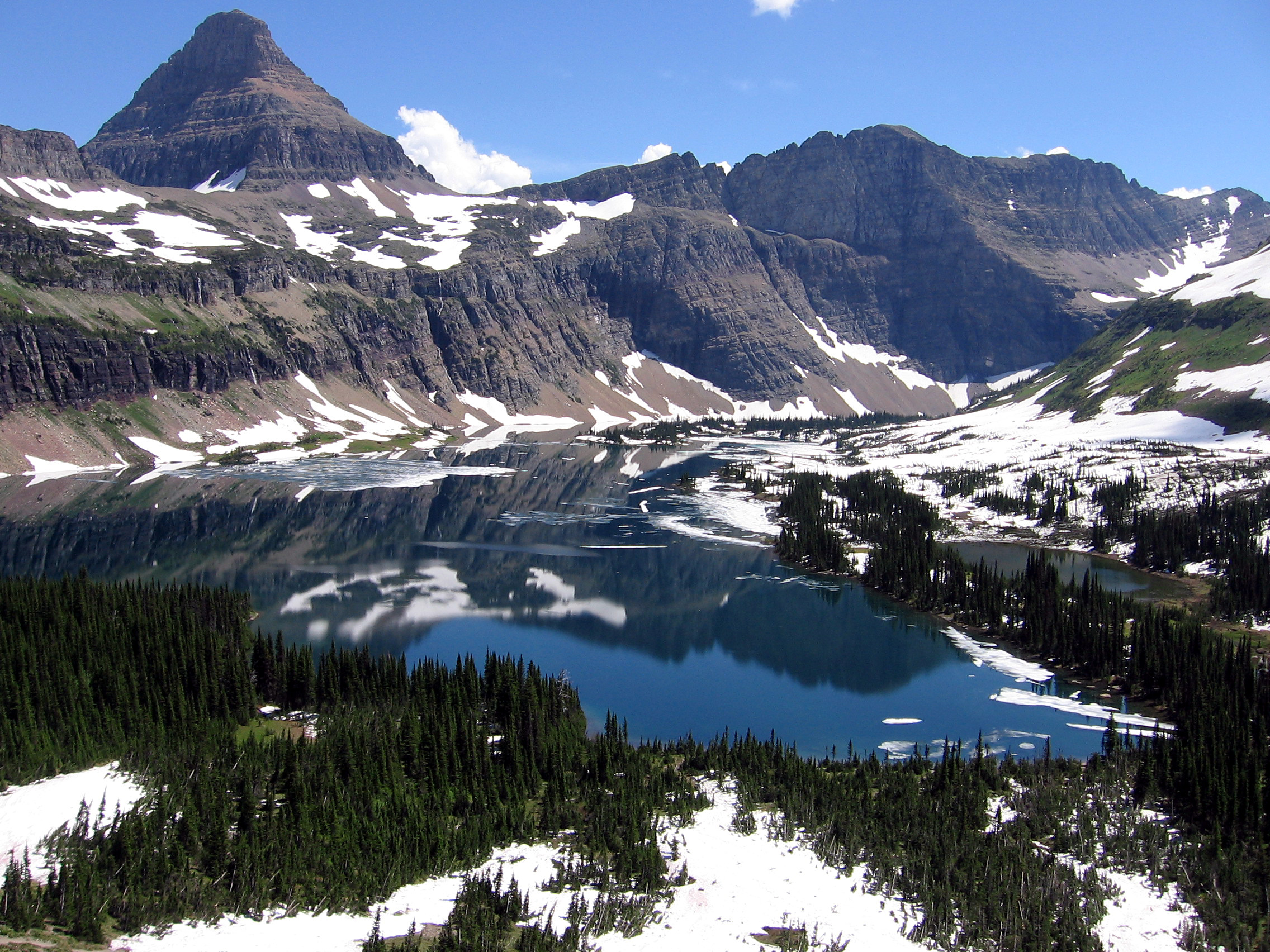
Reynolds Mountain (left) and Dragons Tail (right)

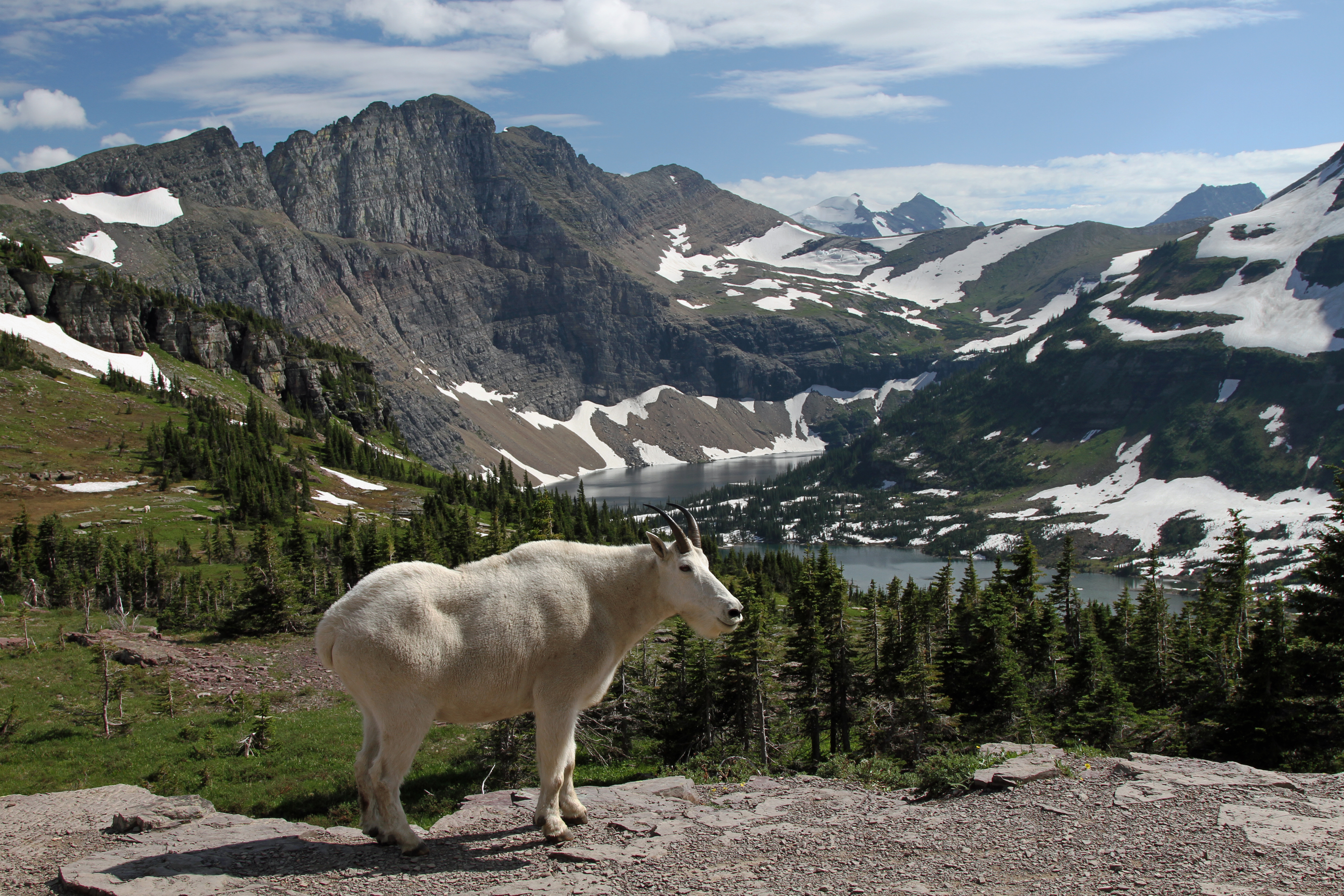
with mountain goat

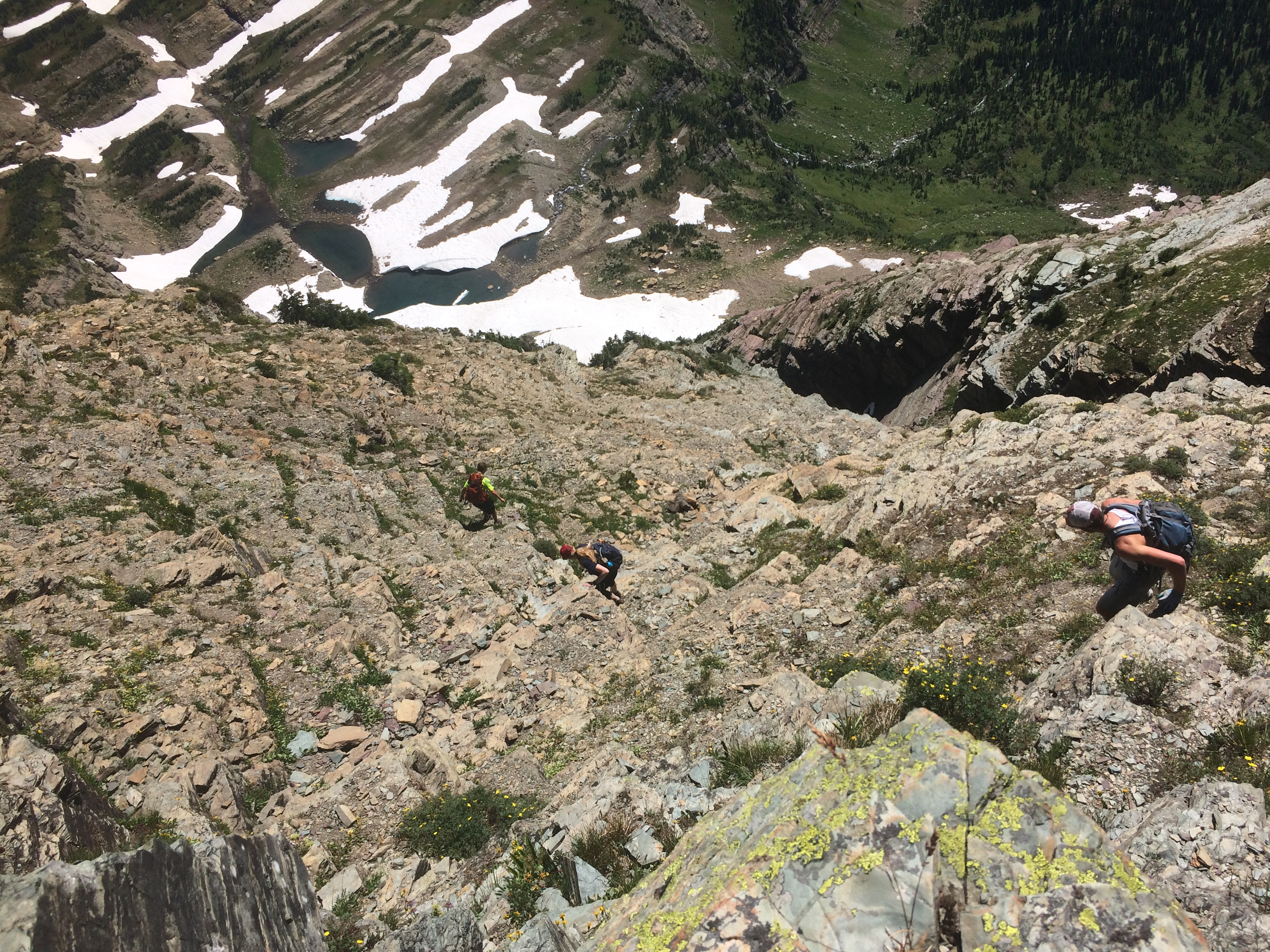
Climbers descend from the ridge of Dragons Tail

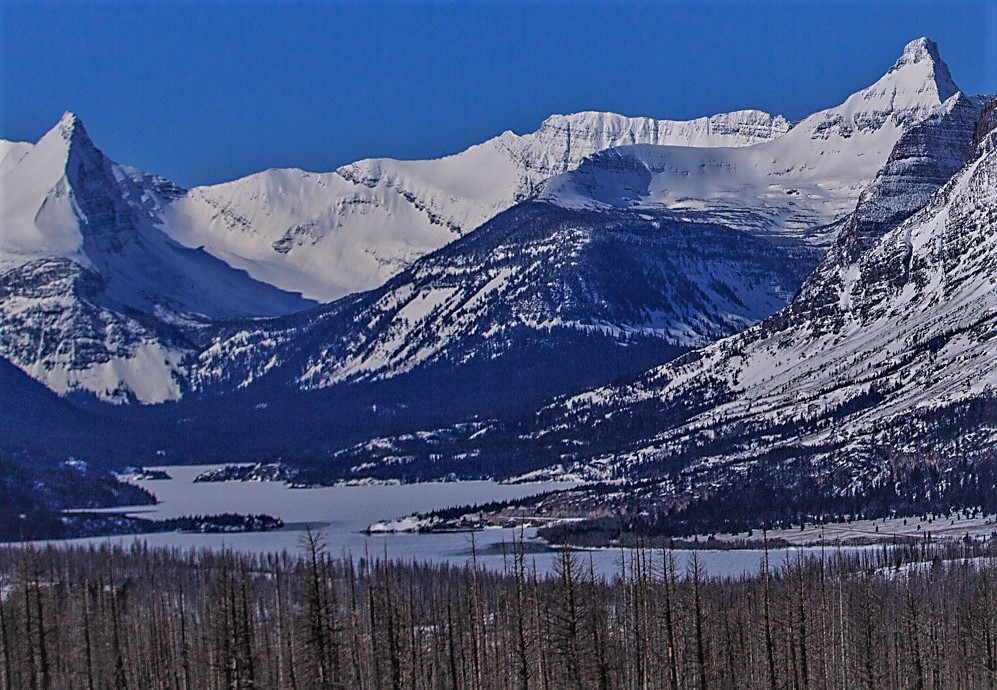
Dragons Tail seen from the east, with Fusillade Mountain far left edge, Reynolds Mountain upper right corner, and frozen Saint Mary Lake.

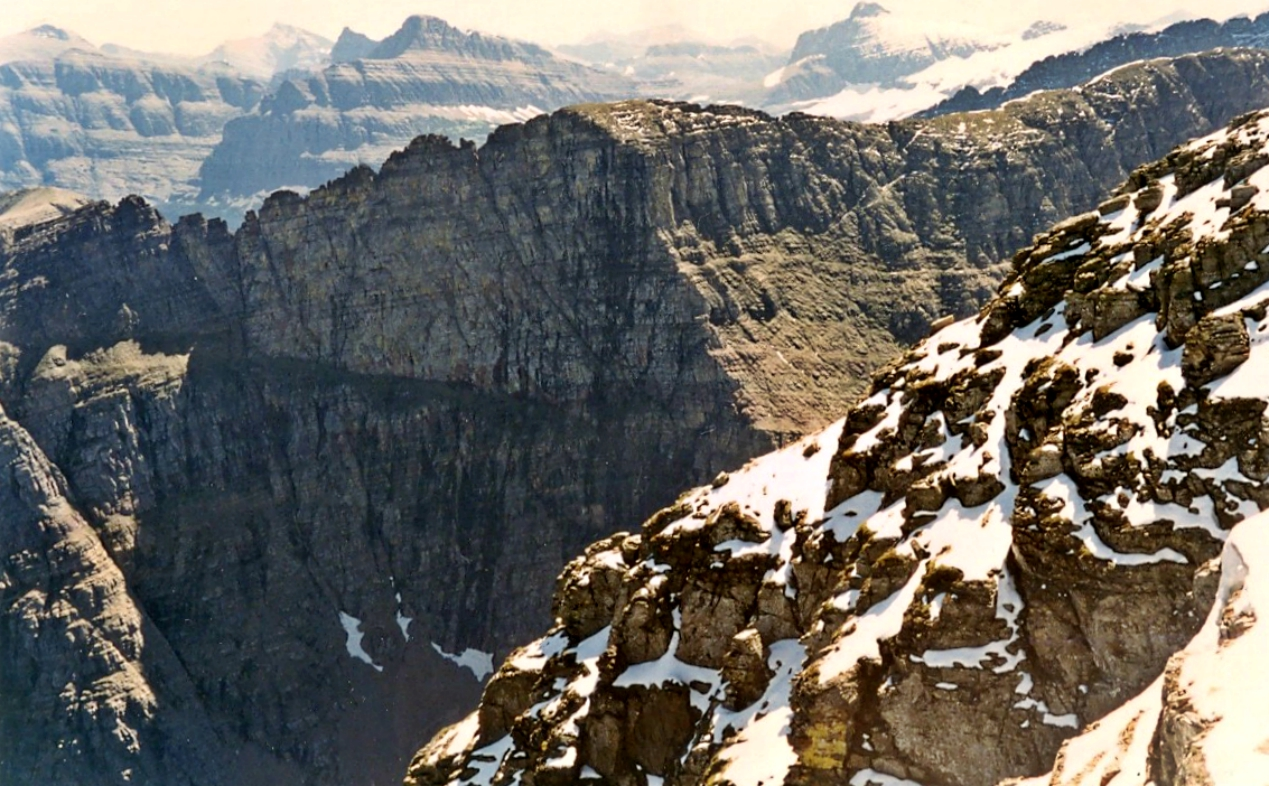
Part of Dragons Tail seen from Bearhat Mountain

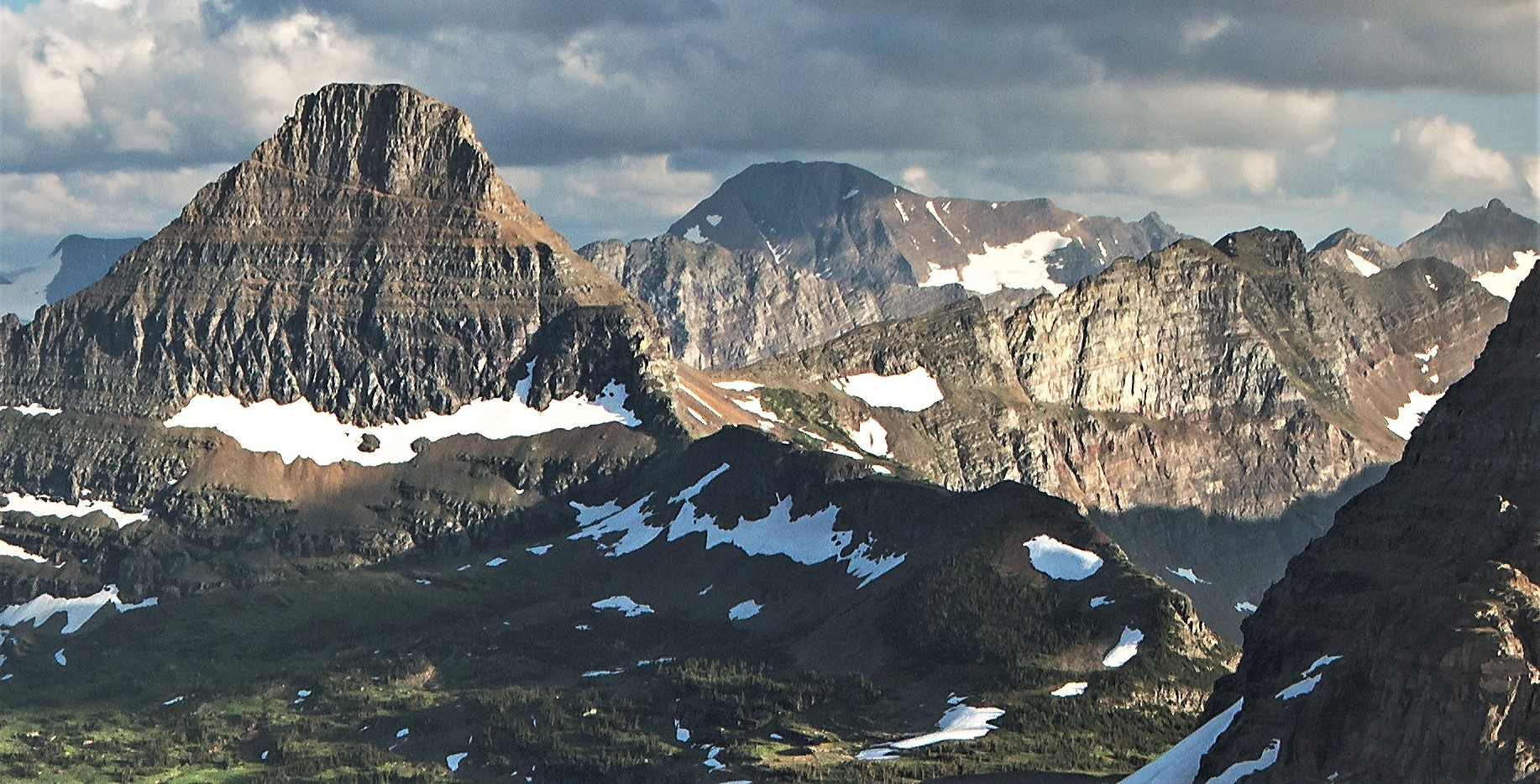
Reynolds Mountain (left), Mt. Jackson (centered), Dragons Tail (right) seen from Mt. Oberlin

== See also ==
- Geology of the Rocky Mountains
- List of mountains and mountain ranges of Glacier National Park (U.S.)
