= Bearhat Mountain =

Mountain in Montana, United States

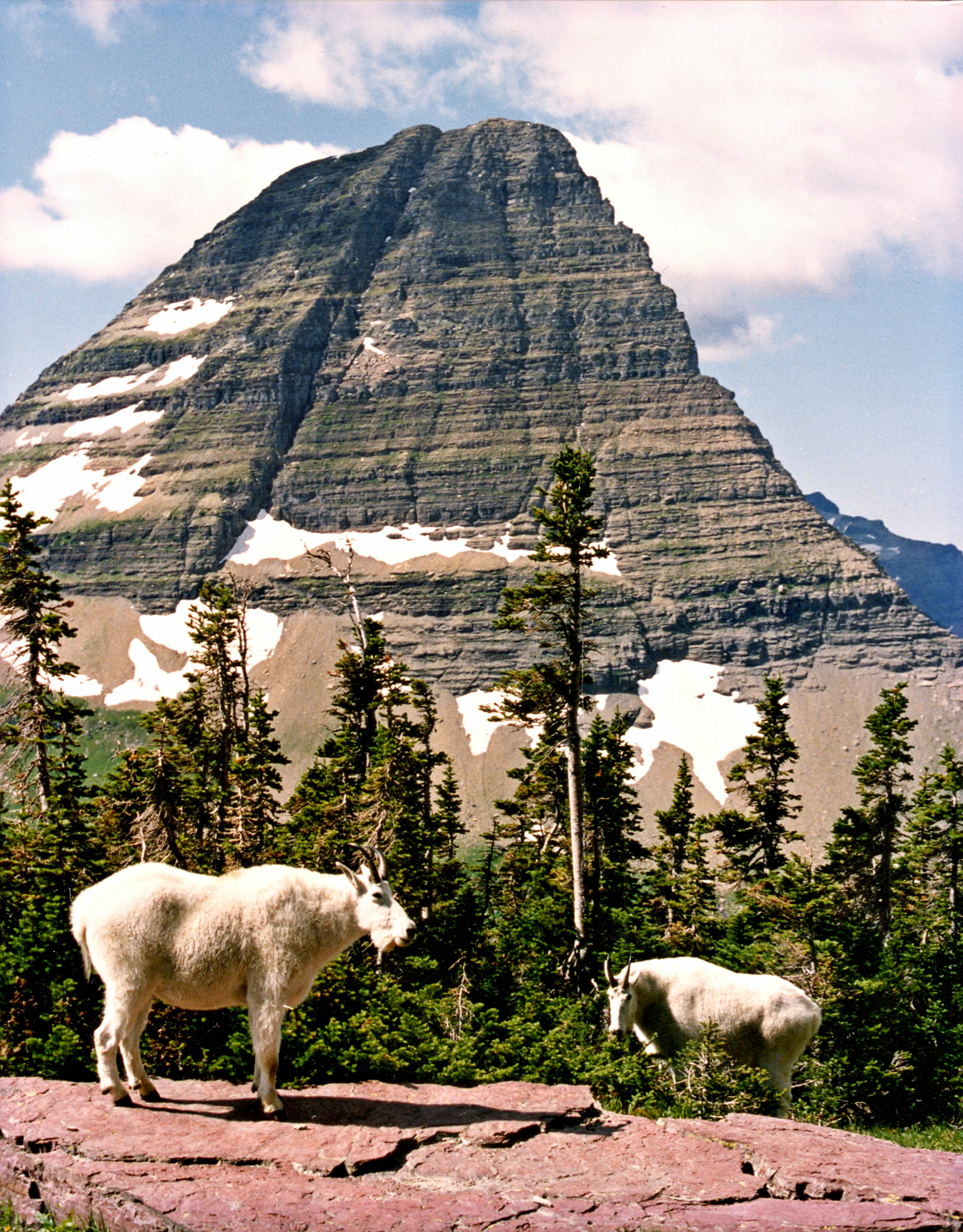
- Bearhat Mountain with mountain goats

Highest point
- Elevation: 8,689 ft (2,648 m)
- Prominence: 1,084 ft (330 m)
- Coordinates: 48°40′01″N 113°45′49″W

Geography
- Location within Montana Location within the United States
- Location: Flathead County, Montana, U.S.
- Parent range: Lewis Range
- Topo map(s): USGS Mount Cannon, MT

Climbing
- First ascent: 1923 (Norman Clyde)

Bearhat Mountain (8,689 feet (2,648 m)) is located in the Lewis Range, Glacier National Park in the U.S. state of Montana. Bearhat Mountain is immediately west of Hidden Lake. The mountain was named after a Kootenai Native American, and was officially adopted by the U.S. Board on Geographic Names in 1932.

Based on the Köppen climate classification, Bearhat Mountain has an alpine climate characterized by long, usually very cold winters, and short, cool to mild summers. Temperatures can drop below −10 °F with wind chill factors below −30 °F.

== Geology ==
Like other mountains in Glacier National Park, Bearhat Mountain is composed of sedimentary rock laid down during the Precambrian to Jurassic periods. Formed in shallow seas, this sedimentary rock was initially uplifted beginning 170 million years ago when the Lewis Overthrust fault pushed an enormous slab of precambrian rocks 3 mi (4.8 km) thick, 50 miles (80 km) wide and 160 miles (260 km) long over younger rock of the cretaceous period.

== See also ==
- Geology of the Rocky Mountains
- Mountains and mountain ranges of Glacier National Park (U.S.)

== Gallery ==
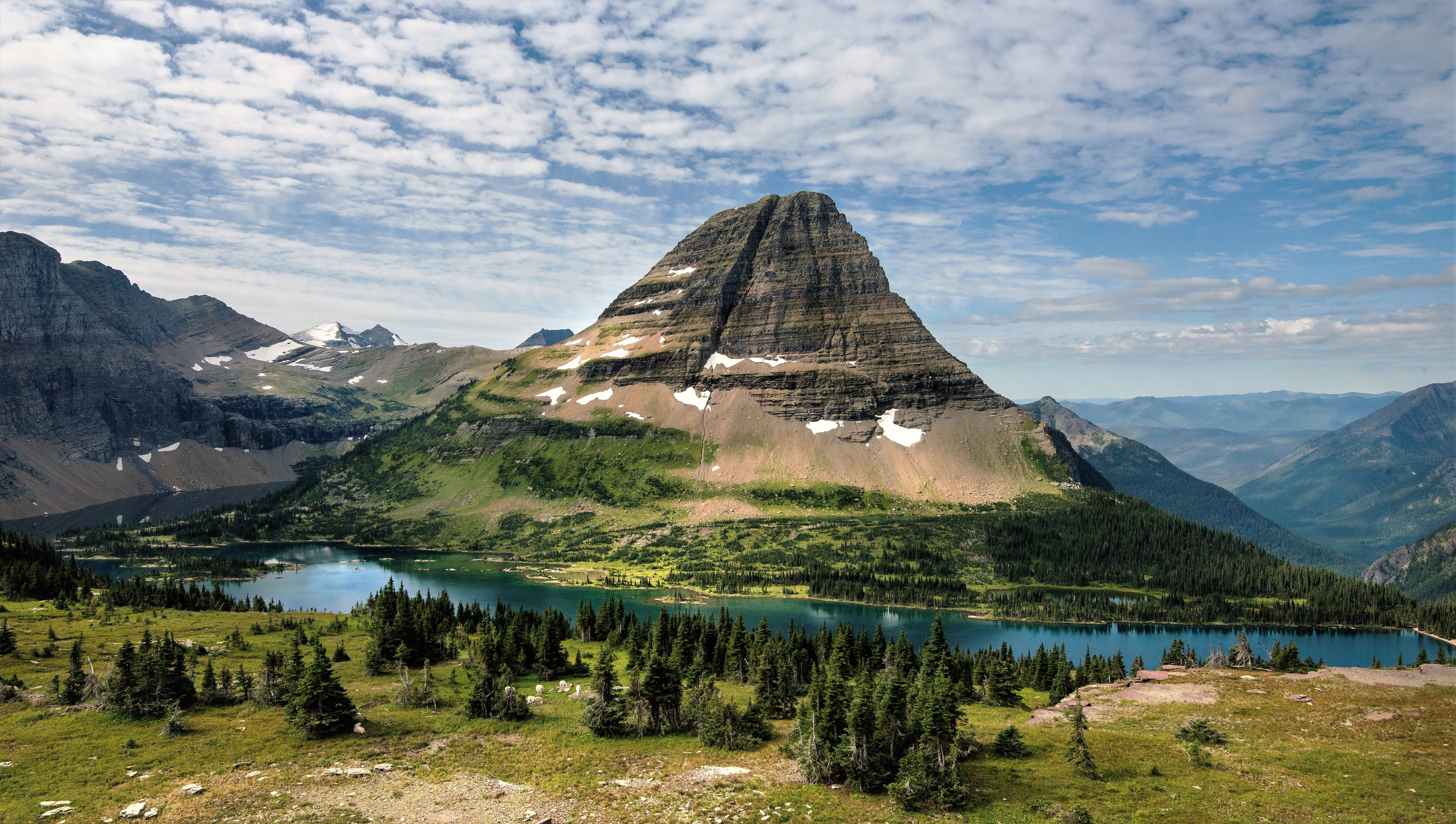
Panorama with Bearhat Mountain, Hidden Lake below

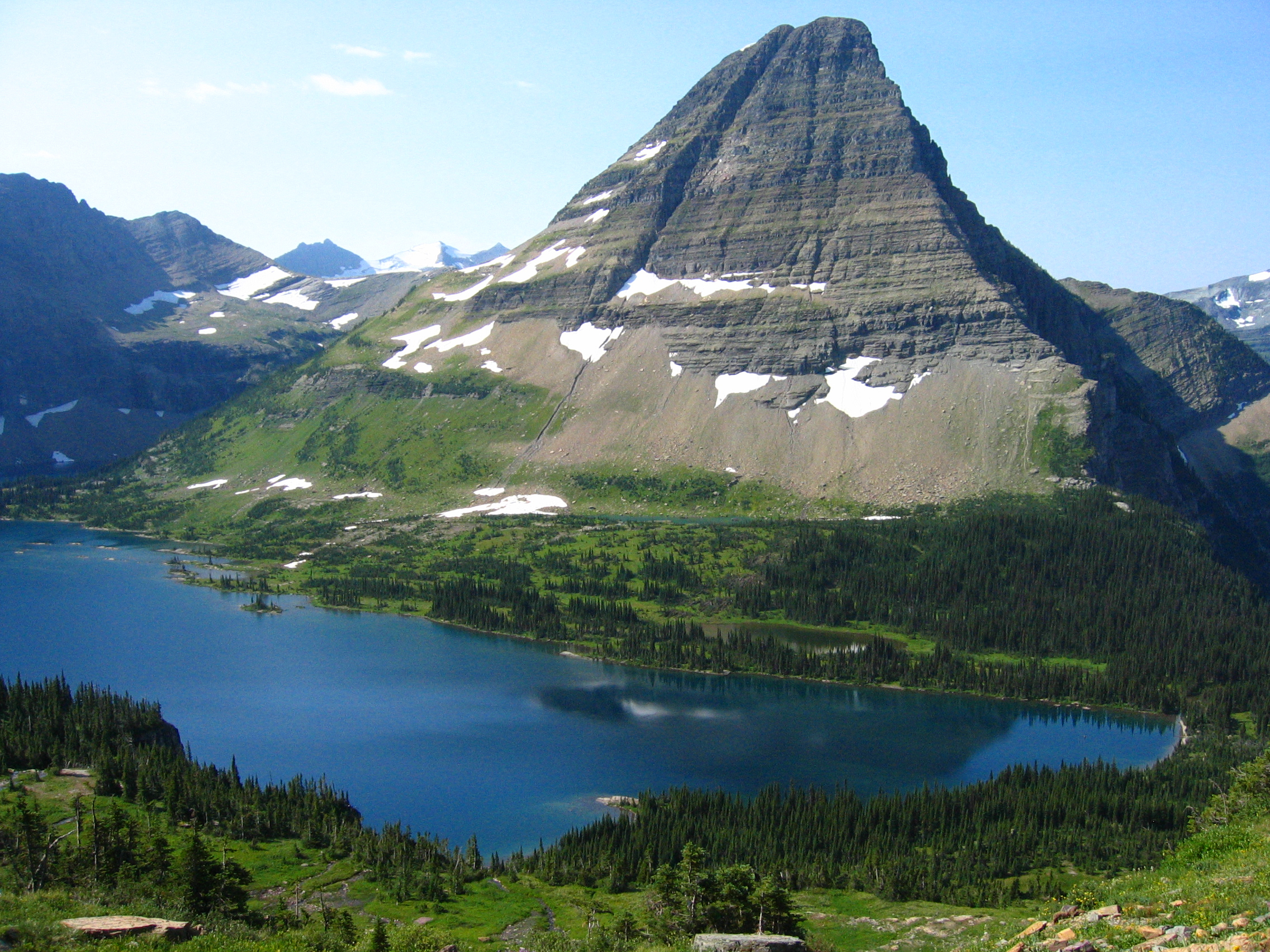
Bearhat Mountain rises over Hidden Lake

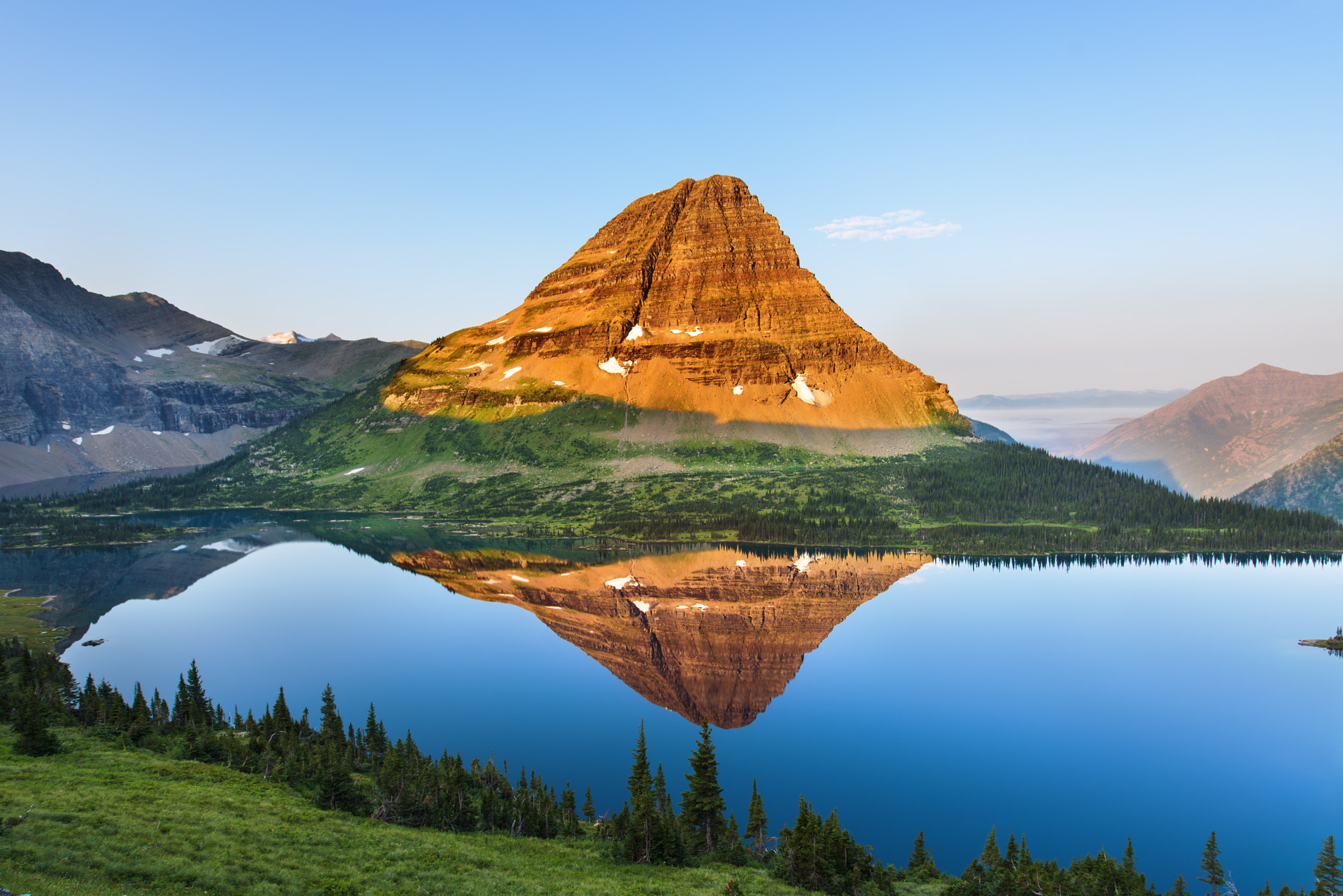
Bearhat reflected in Hidden Lake

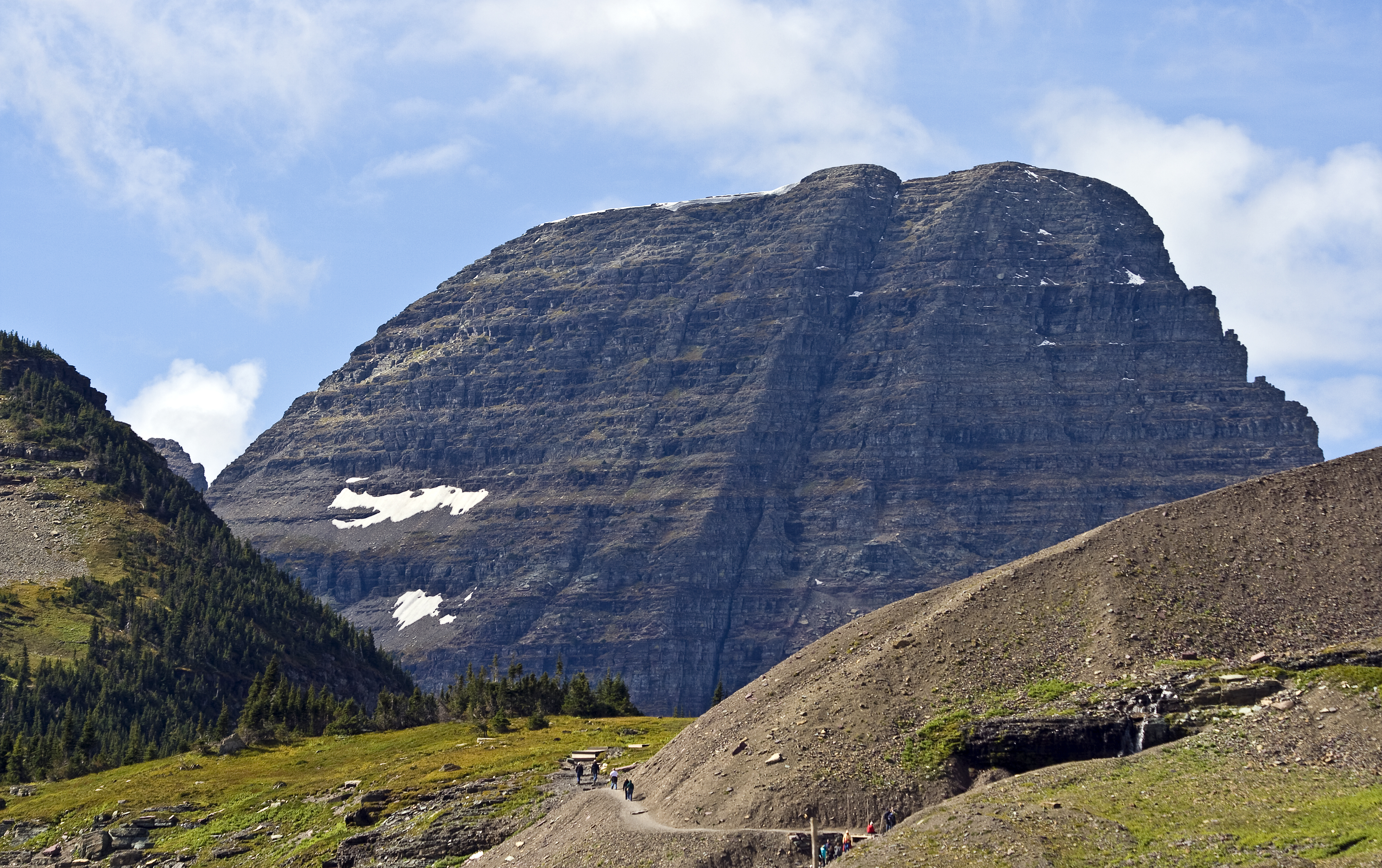
Bearhat Mountain above the Hidden Lake trail

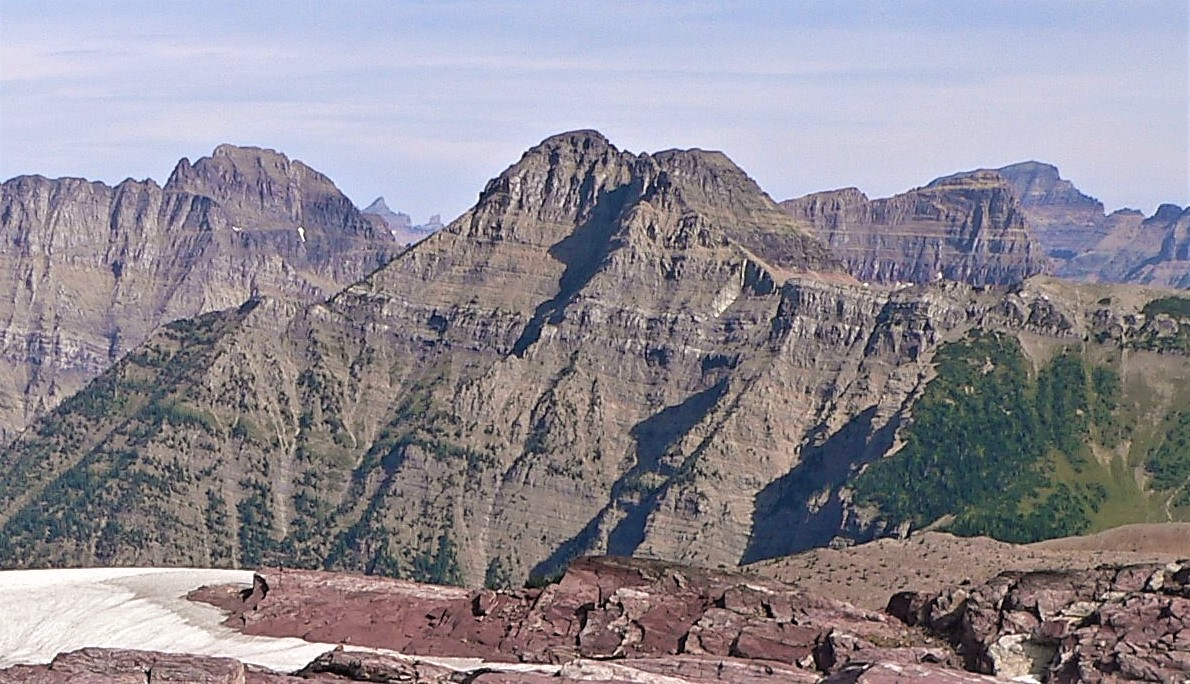
South aspect showing the true summit of Bearhat

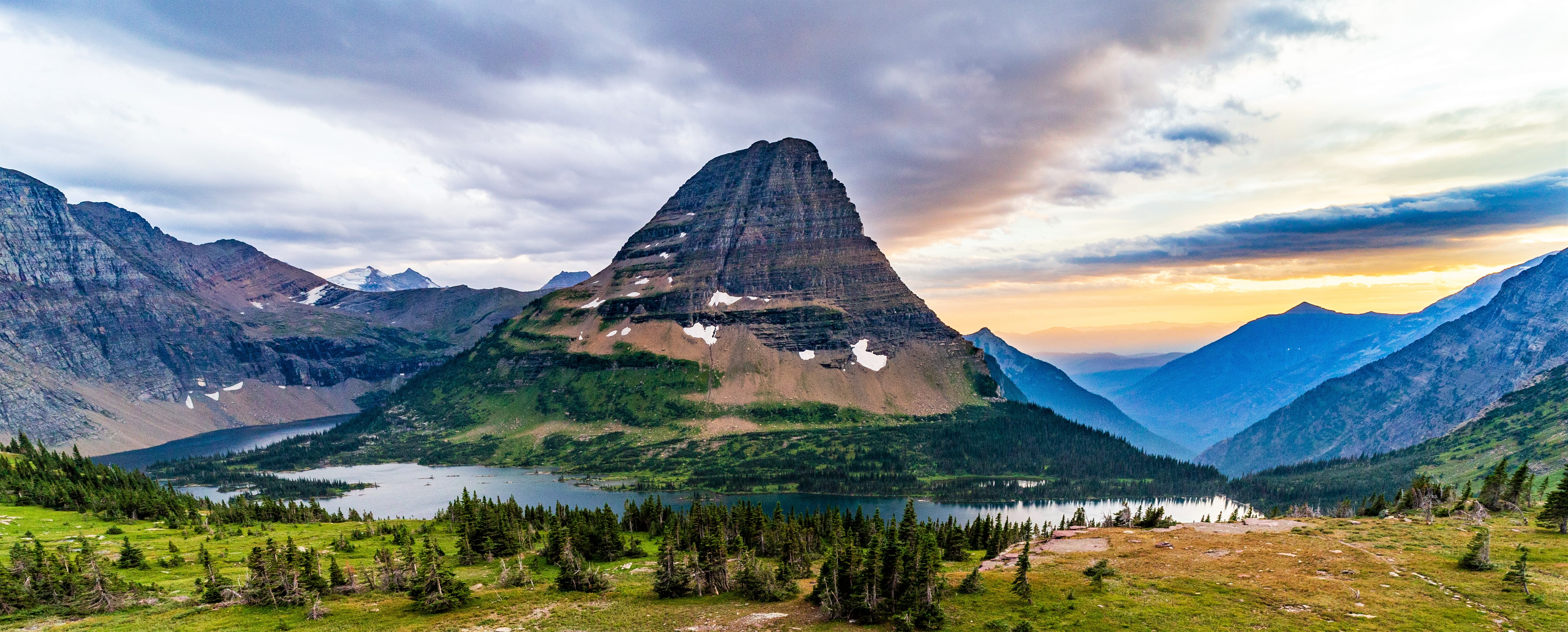
