= Avalanche Lake (Flathead County, Montana) =

Lake in Montana, United States

- Avalanche Lake as seen from the SSE. Heavens Peak in the left.

- Location within Montana Location within the United States
- Location: Glacier National Park, Flathead County, Montana, US
- Coordinates: 48°39′23″N 113°47′08″W
- Type: Natural
- Primary outflows: Avalanche Creek
- Basin countries: United States
- Max. length: .60 mi (0.97 km)
- Max. width: .20 mi (0.32 km)
- Max. depth: 63 ft (19 m)
- Surface elevation: 3,905 ft (1,190 m)

Avalanche Lake is located in Glacier National Park, in the U. S. state of Montana. Avalanche Lake is southwest of Bearhat Mountain and receives meltwater from Sperry Glacier. Avalanche Lake is a 2 miles (3.2 km) hike from the trailhead along the Trail of the Cedars. The trail roughly follows Avalanche Creek, a whitewater creek that drains out of Avalanche Lake and drains into Haystack Creek. When measured in August 1910, the maximum depth of the lake was 63 feet (19 m) near the upper end.

== History ==
Avalanche Lake was named in 1895 by a party including Dr. Lyman Sperry, namesake of the Sperry Glacier, who witnessed many avalanches during their stay.

== Nature ==
Though most lakes of similar size and elevation in Glacier National Park do not have fish, Avalanche Lake is a popular fishing location among anglers. Westslope cutthroat trout are native to the lake.

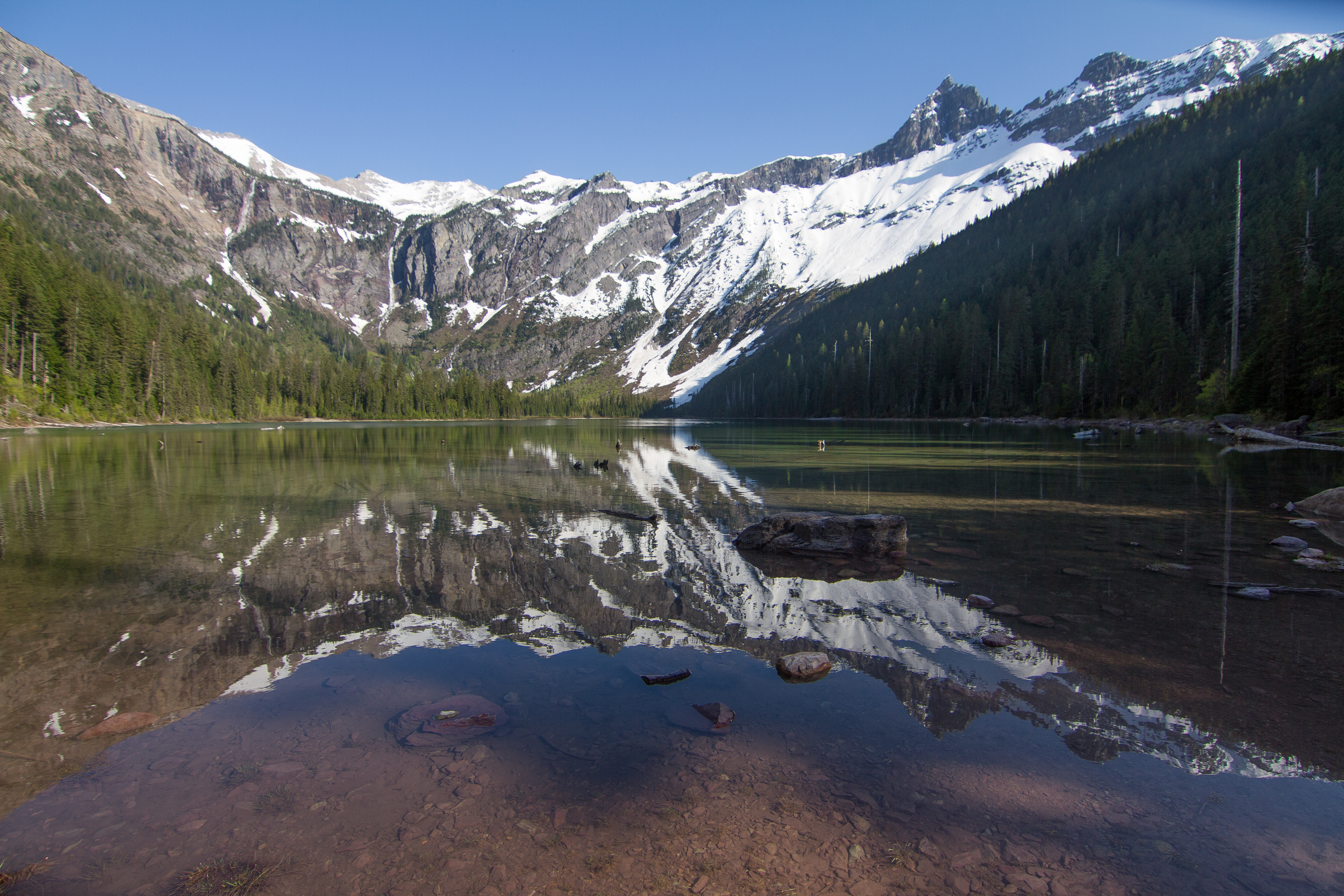
Avalanche Lake (Little Matterhorn to right)

== See also ==
- List of lakes in Flathead County, Montana (A-L)
