= Edwards Mountain =

Mountain in Montana, United States

- From due south

Highest point
- Elevation: 9,076 ft (2,766 m) NAVD 88
- Prominence: 1,072 ft (327 m)
- Coordinates: 48°37′22″N 113°47′10″W

Geography
- Location within Montana Location within the United States
- Location: Flathead County, Montana, U.S.
- Parent range: Lewis Range
- Topo map(s): USGS Lake McDonald East, MT

Climbing
- First ascent: Unknown

Edwards Mountain (9,076 feet (2,766 m)) is located in the Lewis Range, Glacier National Park in the U.S. state of Montana. Edwards Mountain rises just to the west of Sperry Glacier. Based on the Köppen climate classification, Edwards Mountain has an alpine climate characterized by long, usually very cold winters, and short, cool to mild summers. Temperatures can drop below −10 °F with wind chill factors below −30 °F.

== Geology ==
Like other mountains in Glacier National Park, Edwards Mountain is composed of sedimentary rock laid down during the Precambrian to Jurassic periods. Formed in shallow seas, this sedimentary rock was initially uplifted beginning 170 million years ago when the Lewis Overthrust fault pushed an enormous slab of precambrian rocks 3 mi (4.8 km) thick, 50 miles (80 km) wide and 160 miles (260 km) long over younger rock of the cretaceous period.

== Gallery ==
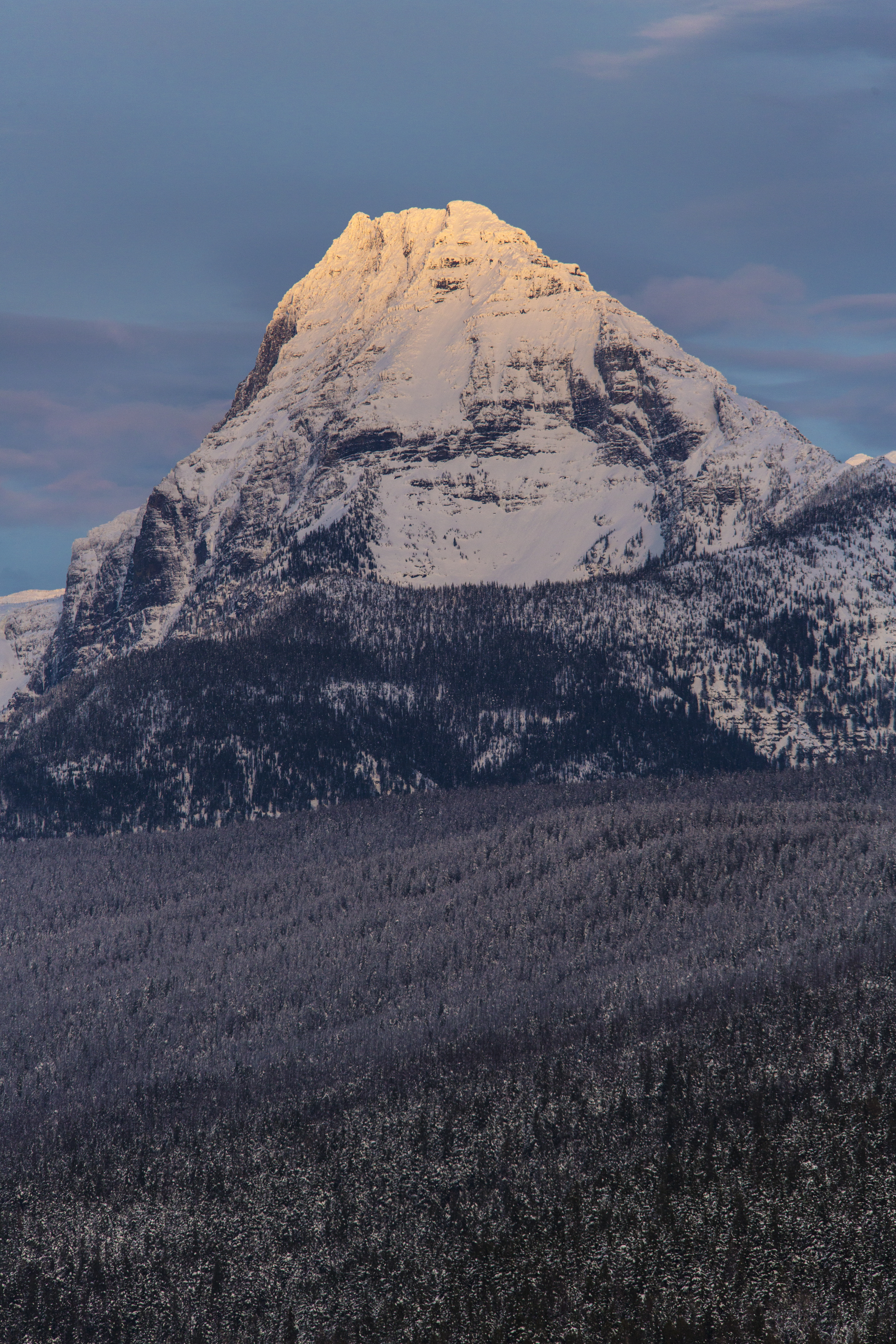
Southwest aspect at sunset

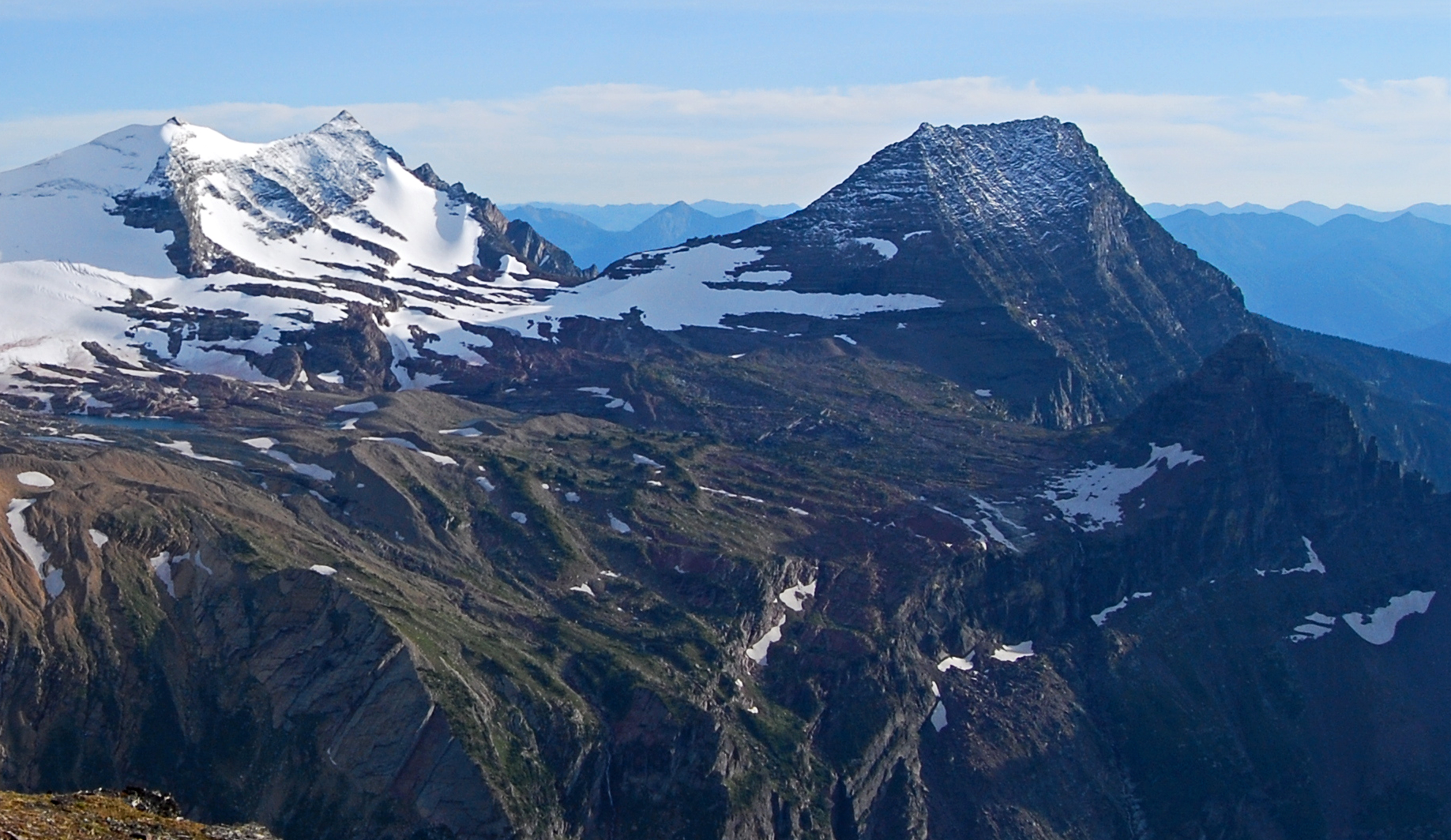
Gunsight Mountain (left), Edwards Mountain, and Little Matterhorn (lower right) seen from Bearhat Mountain

== See also ==
- Mountains and mountain ranges of Glacier National Park (U.S.)
- Geology of the Rocky Mountains
