= Trail of the Cedars =

Hiking trail in Montana, United States

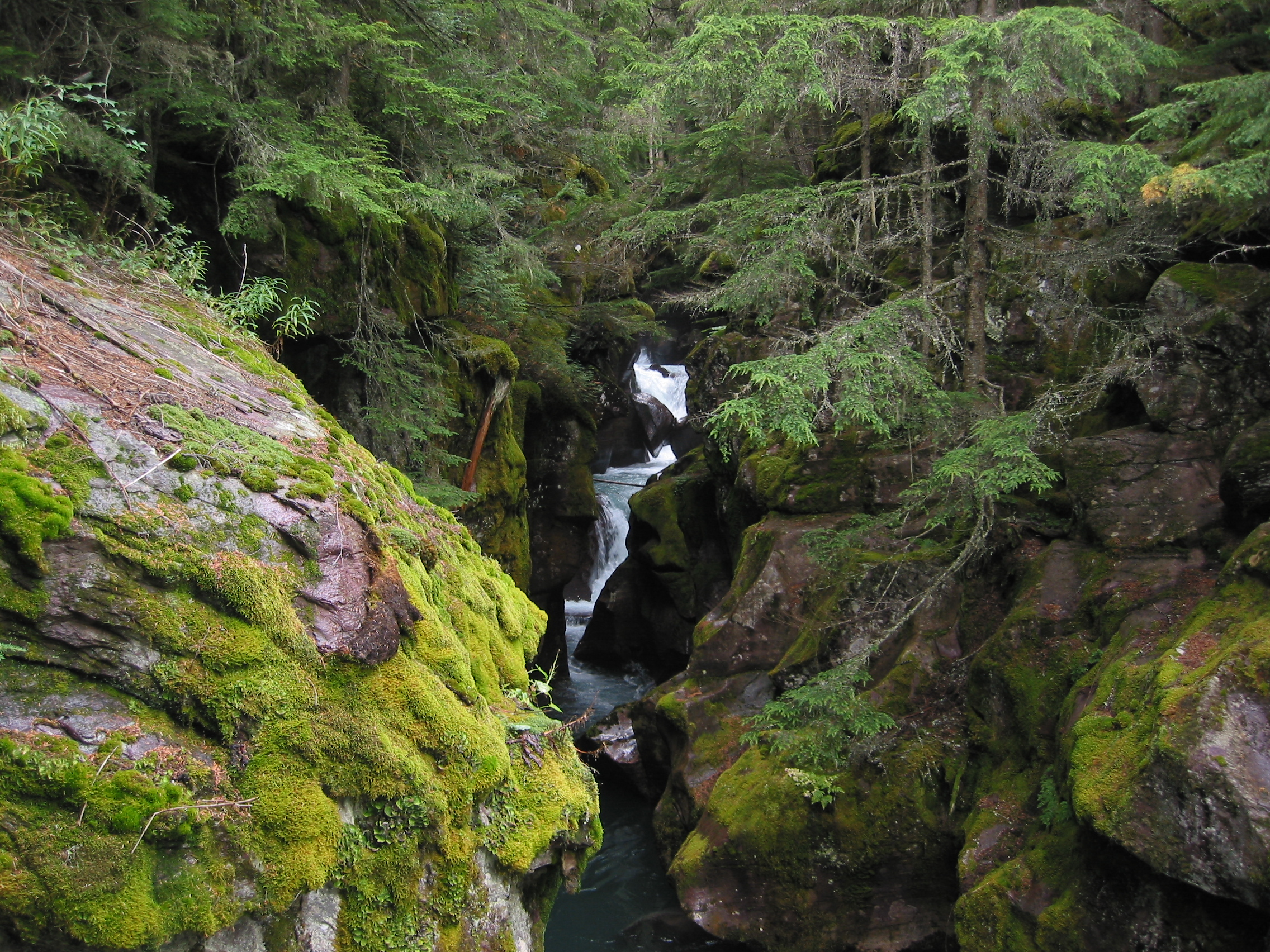
Avalanche Gorge

The Trail of the Cedars is a hiking trail accessible from Going-to-the-Sun Road in Glacier National Park, Montana. The .60-mile (0.97 km) path is paved and has a raised boardwalk in some sections. Some of the cedars visible are over 80 feet (24 m) tall. The trail splits into two sections: one loops, while the other continues to Avalanche Lake which can reached after a 2-mile (3.2 km) hike with a 500-foot (150 m) elevation gain. In the middle of the half loop is a beautiful waterfall that has carved through colorful rock to make a channeled stream.
