= Sperry Glacier =

Glacier in the U.S. state of Montana

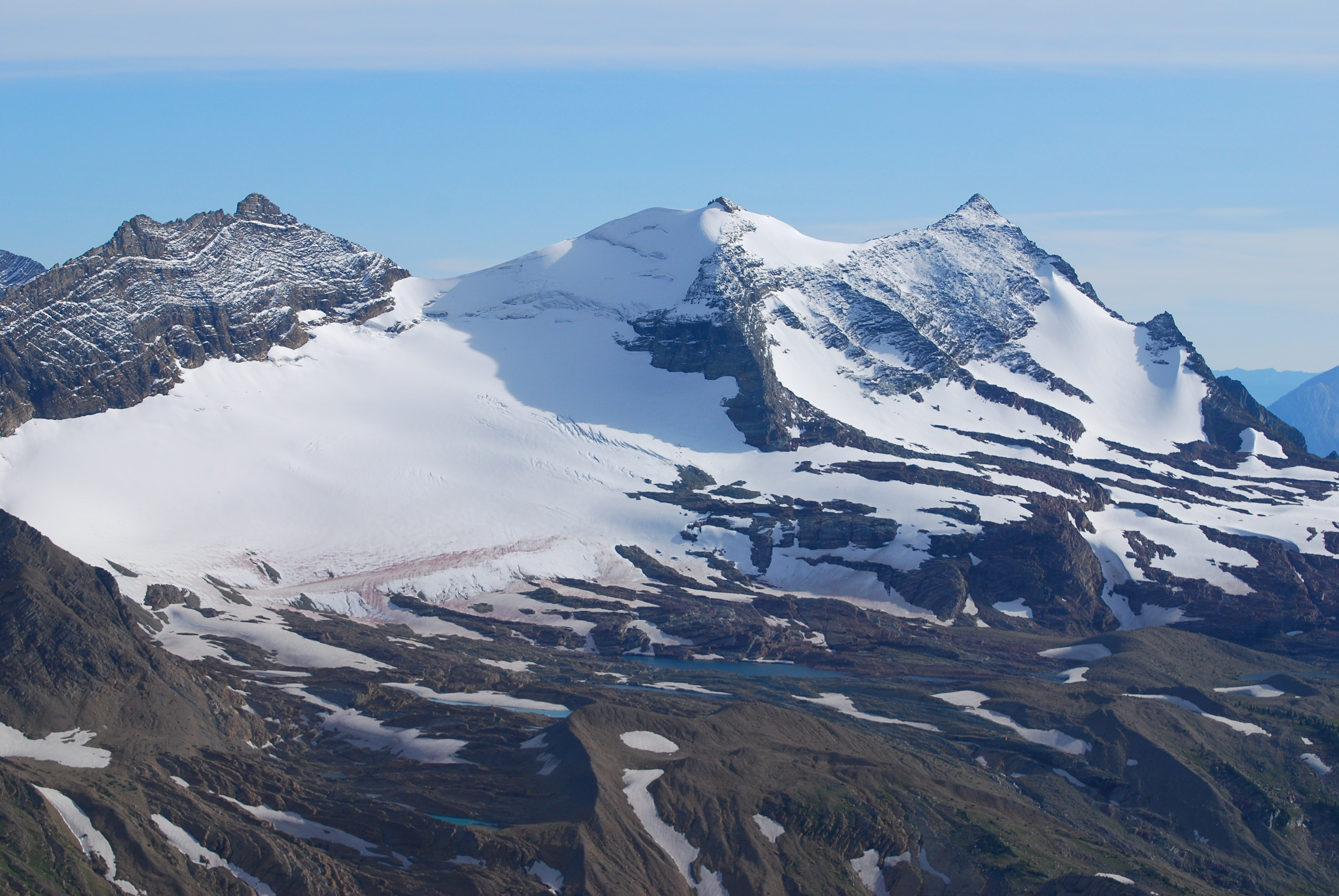
- Sperry Glacier beneath snowy Gunsight Mountain - September 8, 2008
- Interactive map of Sperry Glacier
- Type: Mountain glacier
- Location: Glacier National Park, Flathead County, Montana, United States
- Coordinates: 48°37′23″N 113°45′44″W
- Area: 216 acres (0.87 km^{2}) in 2005
- Terminus: Talus
- Status: Retreating

Sperry Glacier is a glacier on the north slopes of Gunsight Mountain west of the Continental Divide in Glacier National Park in the U.S. state of Montana. Although many geologic features of Glacier National Park were formed during the much longer period of glaciation ending over 10,000 years ago, Sperry Glacier — like all the glaciers in the park today — is a product of the recent Little Ice Age, the period of cooler average temperatures starting in about the 13th century and concluding in the mid-19th century.

Once one of the largest glaciers in the park, the surface area of Sperry Glacier has retreated 75 percent since the mid-19th century. 2005 measurements of the surface area of the glacier resulted in an estimated area of 216 acres (0.87 km^{2}), whereas the glacier is estimated to have covered an area of 930 acres (3.8 km^{2}) at the end of the Little Ice Age in the mid-19th century. The glacier lost almost 35 percent of its surface area between 1966 and 2005. The glacier is named for Lyman B. Sperry, a professor from Oberlin College, who in 1895 participated in an expedition to explore the geography and map the region where the glacier is located. Like all other glaciers in the park, Sperry has significantly retreated, though it leaves many minor glacial features, including large moraines and streams and lakes colored a milky aqua from glacial flour. Unlike the more famous Grinnell Glacier, Sperry Glacier is high above the lakes it feeds, so no icebergs form.

== Visiting the Glacier ==
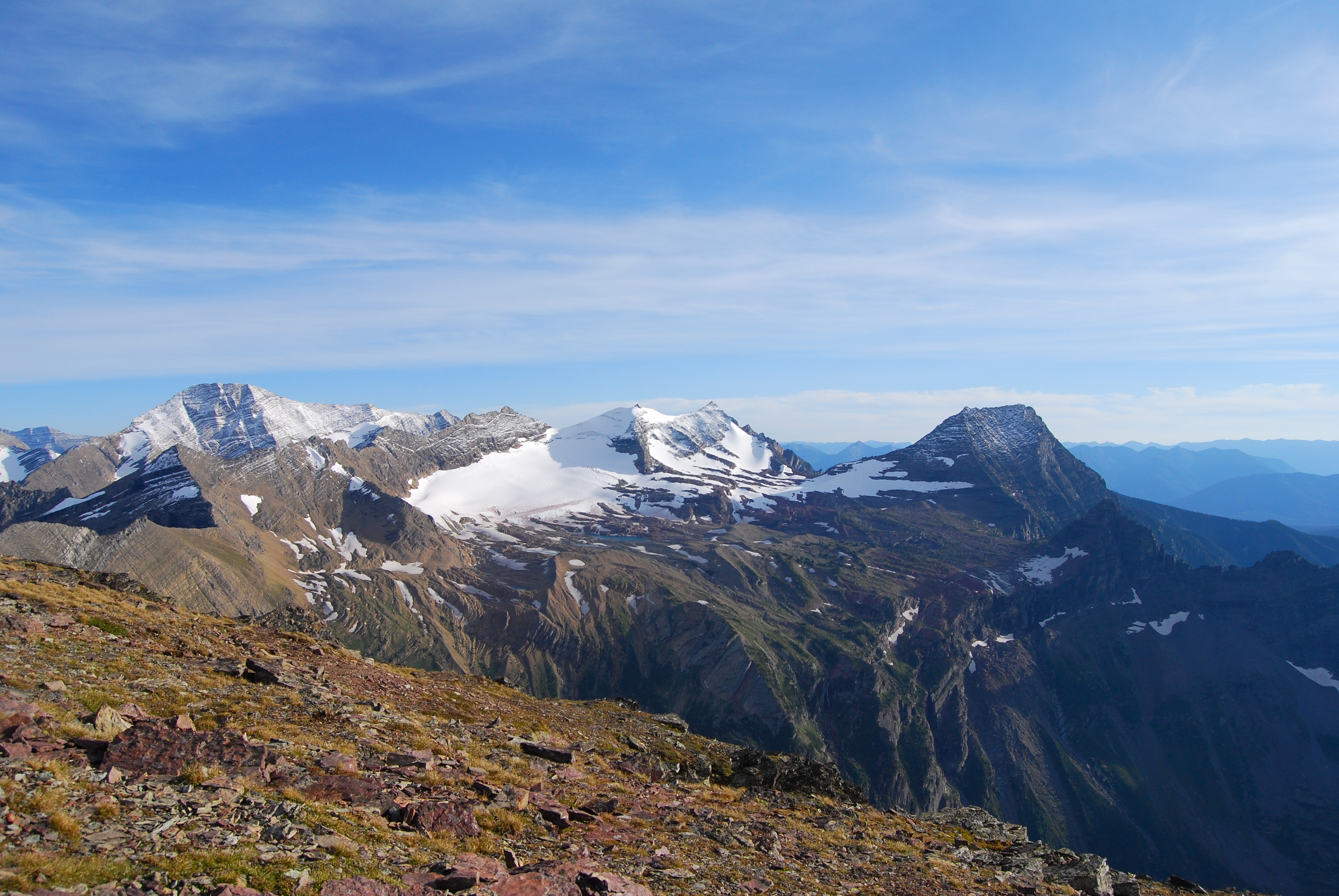
Sperry Glacier from the summit of Bearhat Mountain

Hikers often spend the night at Sperry Chalet or its neighboring campground before undertaking the hike to Sperry Glacier. Although it is only 7 miles (11 km) round-trip from Sperry Chalet to Sperry Glacier, the trail is quite steep, rising 1,600 feet (490 m) in just 2.5 miles (4.0 km). Invisible from the rocky slopes below, a series of glacial cirques with streams, waterfalls and lakes reflecting snow fields and mountain peaks leads to a steep and narrow stone staircase cut into the stone ridge of Comeau Pass. The view from the top of the steps is panoramic, encompassing Mount Brown, Edwards Mountain, and Little Matterhorn.

Reaching the glacier itself involves crossing a wide rock scrabble, snow fields, and the technically challenging glacial moraine. Following the rock cairns and other trail markers will ensure the best footing and easiest routes. Ranger-led hikes are available, starting at the chalet.

For the more adventurous hiker, the glacier and the surrounding area known as Floral Park can be reached via a long day hike starting from Logan Pass. The route takes the hiker along the entire western edge of Hidden Lake before climbing upward along Bearhat Mountain and crossing the westernmost tip of the Dragon's Tail. From there, the route descends into Floral Park, and after a careful traverse across the bottom of the glacier, the hiker can exit the area via Comeau Pass and can descend down to the Going-to-the-Sun Road near Lake McDonald. The route is in the vicinity of 20 miles (32 km) and is quite strenuous.

== See also ==
- List of glaciers in Glacier National Park (U.S.)
- Retreat of glaciers since 1850
- List of glaciers in the United States
