= Lyman B. Sperry =

American physician and explorer (1841–1923)

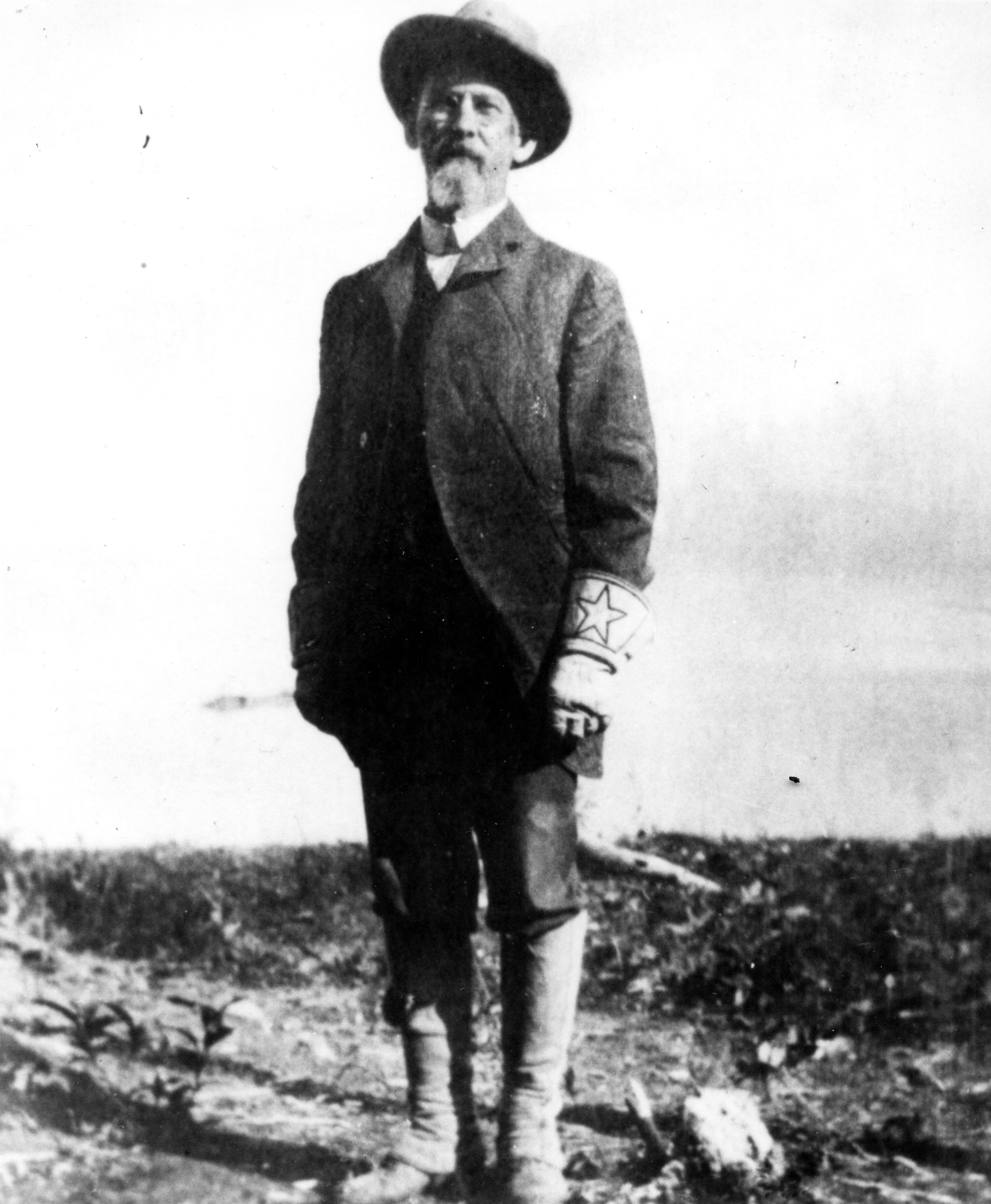
- Born: February 19, 1841; Sherman, New York
- Died: July 1, 1923 (aged 82); Flathead County, Montana
- Organization(s): Oberlin College; Carleton College

Lyman Beecher Sperry (February 19, 1841 – July 1, 1923) was a physician, lecturer, and writer. Nicknamed "The Gentleman Explorer", he was the discoverer of Sperry Glacier in Glacier National Park in Montana, and was influential in the park's promotion to national park status.

== Career ==
Sperry taught at Oberlin College in Ohio and Carleton College in Minnesota. A medical doctor, he wrote multiple books on marriage and health. He also traveled the country giving lectures at colleges and YMCA facilities on "Sanitary Science", an early form of public health. His strong public speaking and persuasion skills likely played a role in his lobbying efforts for Glacier's National Park status.

== Exploration of Glacier National Park ==
Sperry arrived in what is now Glacier National Park in 1895, planning to explore the area and purchase land as an investment. He organized a party to explore the area, and discovered Avalanche Lake and the glacier that now bears his name. Eventually, he decided that public access to the park should be a priority.

To attract visitors to the park, in 1902 Sperry worked out an agreement with James J. Hill, the president of Great Northern Railroad, in which Sperry would recruit students from the University of Minnesota to build trails to the glacier without wages (but the benefit of spending the summer in the mountains) and Hill would arrange for their transportation and accommodations. The trail to Sperry Glacier was completed in 1903, and much of that trail remains today in the national park.

== Selected bibliography ==
- The geology of Rice County: from the sixth annual report of the Geological and Natural History Survey of Minnesota, 1878
- A popular treatise on man, in health and disease, 1879
- A brief treatise on narcotics: their sources, nature, physiological effects, medicinal uses, etc., 1890
- Avalanche Basin, Montana Rockies, 1896
- Husband and wife: a book of information and advice for the married and the marriageable, 1900
- Physiology, fear and faith: a little book containing important facts and suggestions regarding the causes and the cure of disease, the employment of physicians, and the use medicines , 1902
- Confidential Talks with Husband and Wife. A book of information and advice for the married and the marriageable ... Revised edition, 1920
