= Little Matterhorn (Montana) =

Mountain in Montana, United States

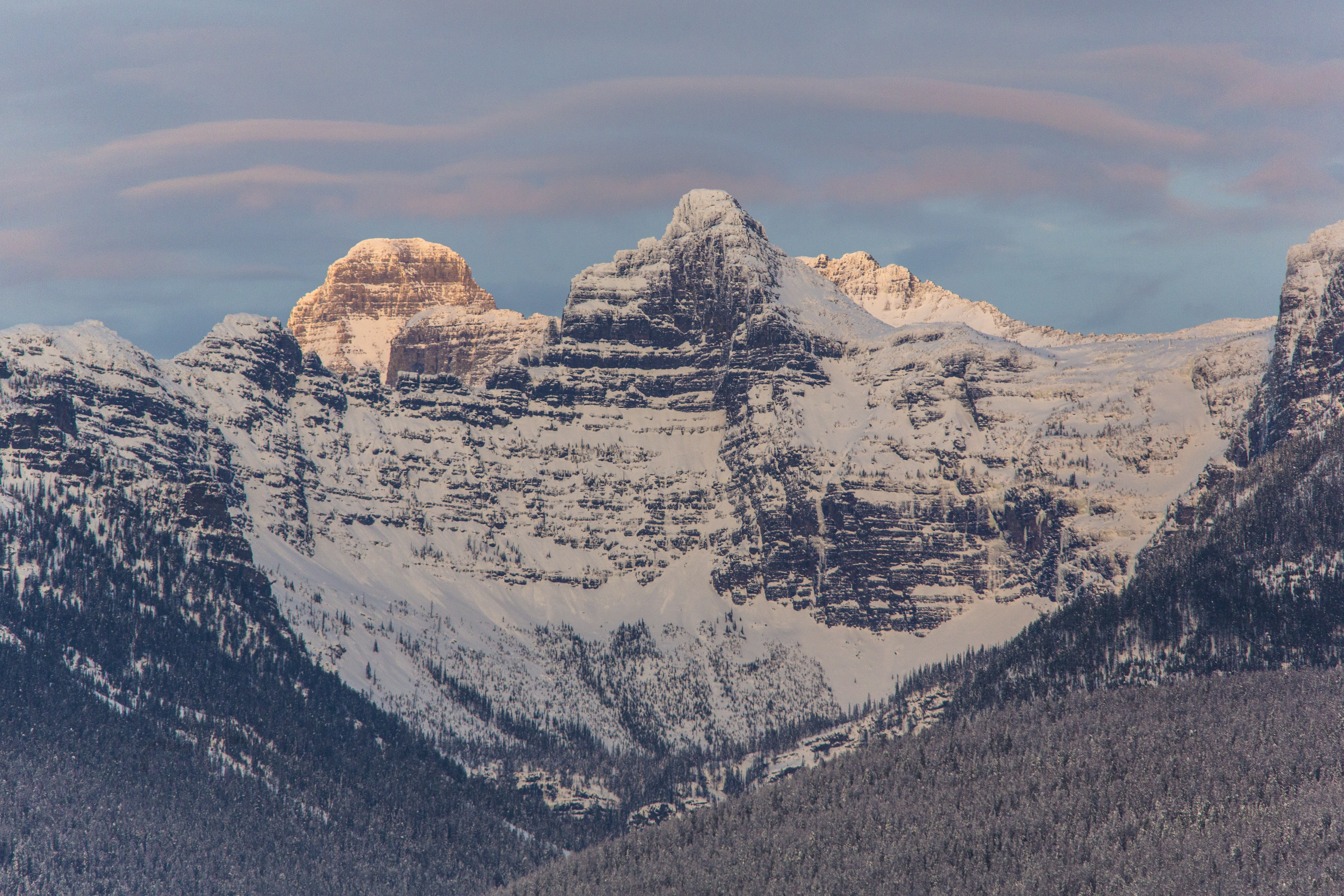
- Little Matterhorn, west aspect

Highest point
- Elevation: 7,886 ft (2,404 m)
- Prominence: 526 ft (160 m)
- Coordinates: 48°38′08″N 113°47′07″W

Geography
- Location within Montana Location within the United States
- Location: Glacier National Park; Flathead County, Montana, U.S.
- Parent range: Lewis Range
- Topo map: USGS Mount Cannon

Geology
- Rock type: Sedimentary rock

Climbing
- Easiest route: West face class 4

Little Matterhorn is a 7,886-foot (2,404 meter) elevation mountain summit located in the Lewis Range, of Glacier National Park in the U.S. state of Montana. The nearest higher peak is Edwards Mountain, 0.9 miles (1.4 km) to the south. Precipitation runoff from the mountain drains into creeks which empty into Lake McDonald.

Based on the Köppen climate classification, Little Matterhorn has an alpine climate characterized by long, usually very cold winters, and short, cool to mild summers. Winter temperatures can drop below −10 °F with wind chill factors below −30 °F.

== Geology ==
Like other mountains in Glacier National Park, Little Matterhorn is composed of sedimentary rock laid down during the Precambrian to Jurassic periods. Formed in shallow seas, this sedimentary rock was initially uplifted beginning 170 million years ago when the Lewis Overthrust fault pushed an enormous slab of precambrian rocks 3 mi (4.8 km) thick, 50 miles (80 km) wide and 160 miles (260 km) long over younger rock of the cretaceous period.

== See also ==
- Geology of the Rocky Mountains
- List of mountains and mountain ranges of Glacier National Park (U.S.)

== Gallery ==
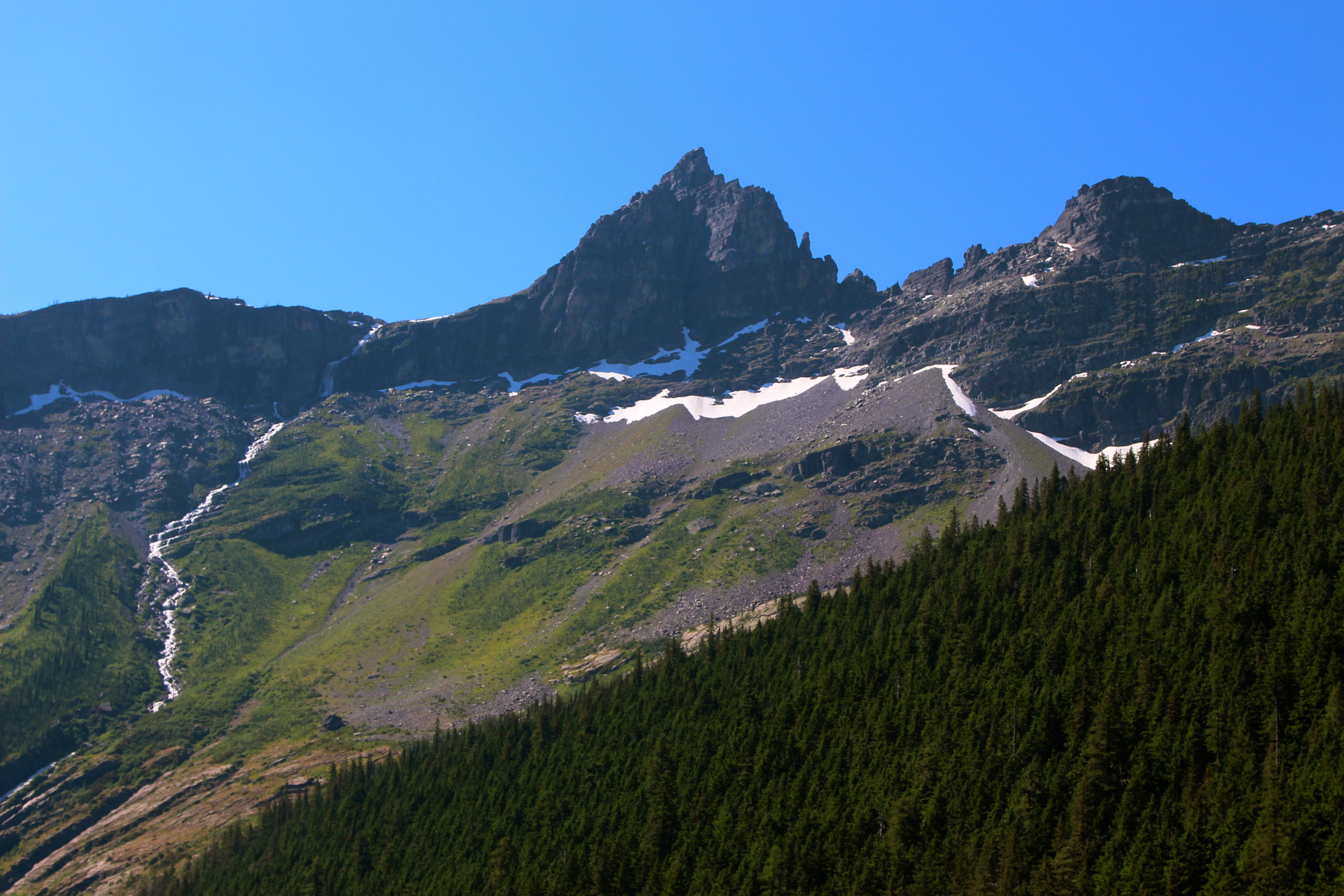
Little Matterhorn, north aspect

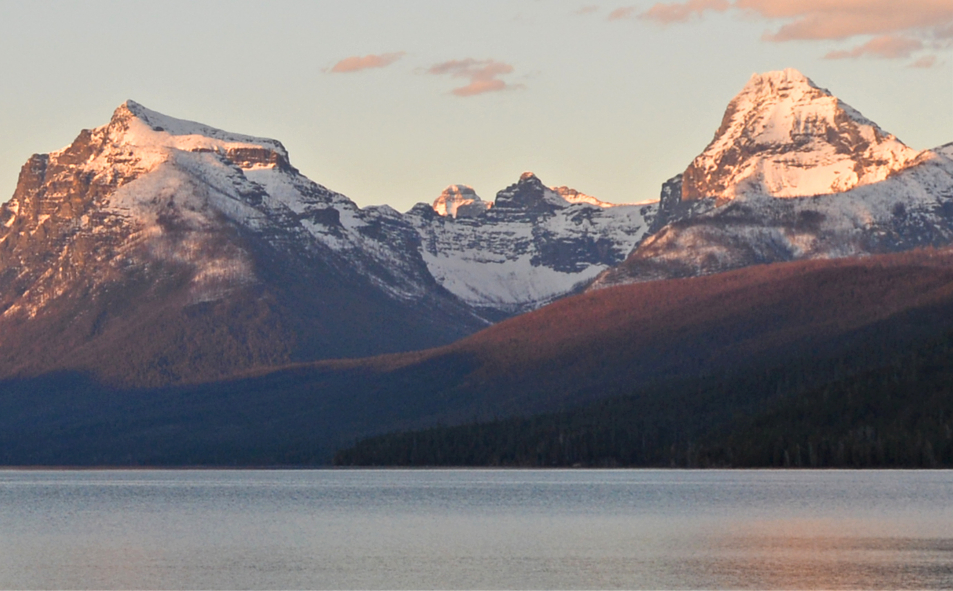
Little Matterhorn centered between Mt. Brown (left) and Edwards Mountain (right)

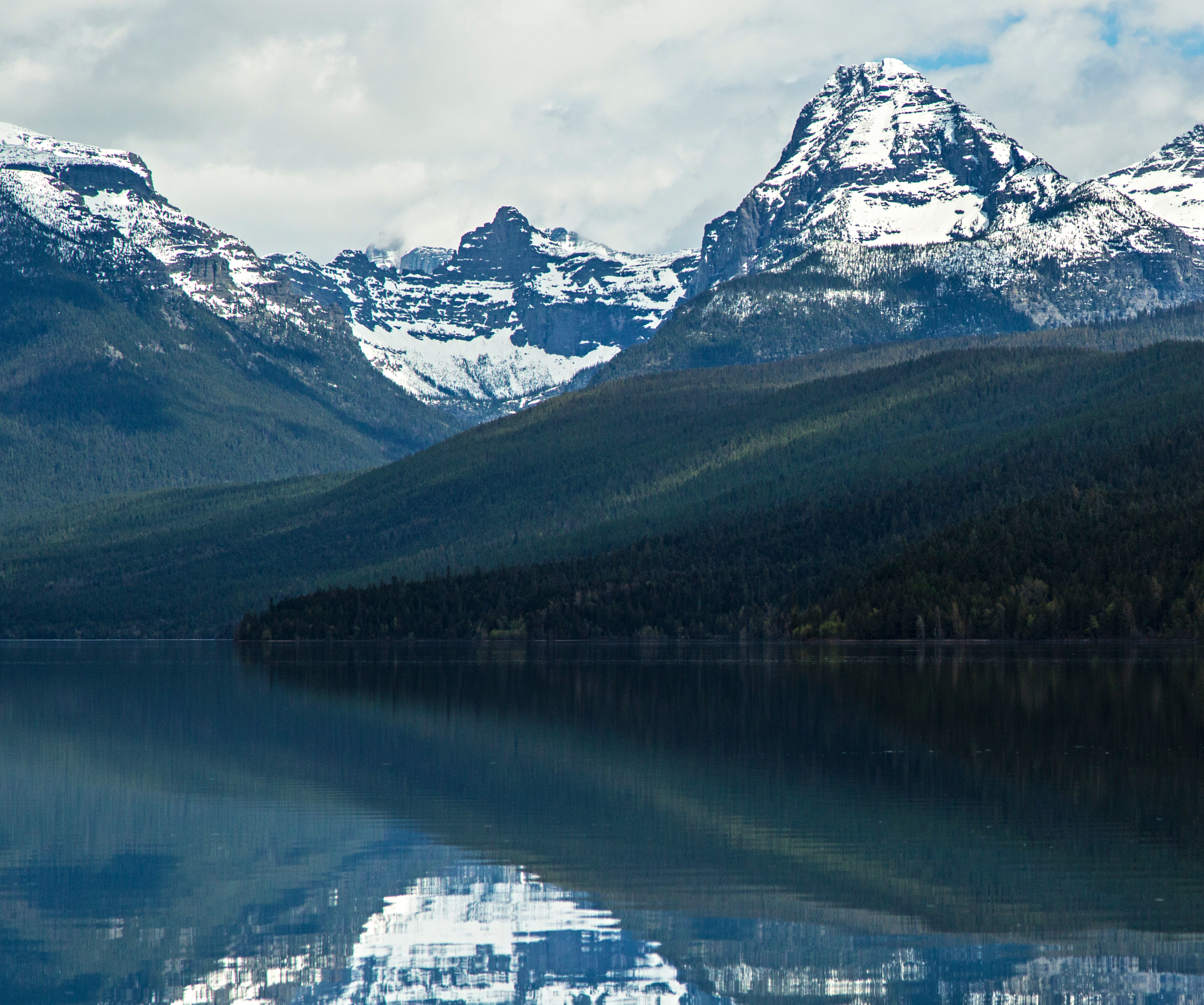
Little Matterhorn and Edwards Mountain from Lake McDonald

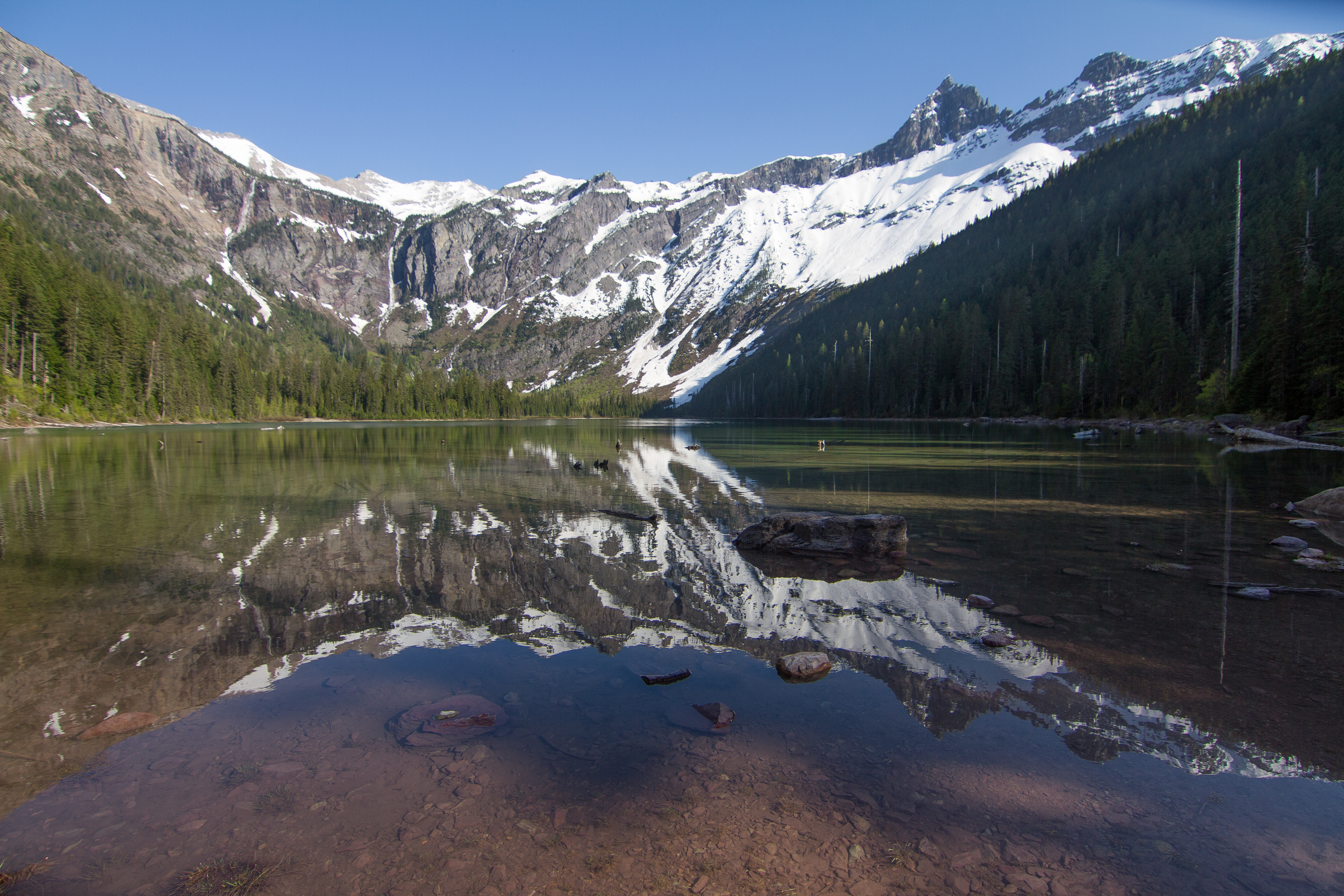
Avalanche Lake, with Little Matterhorn to right

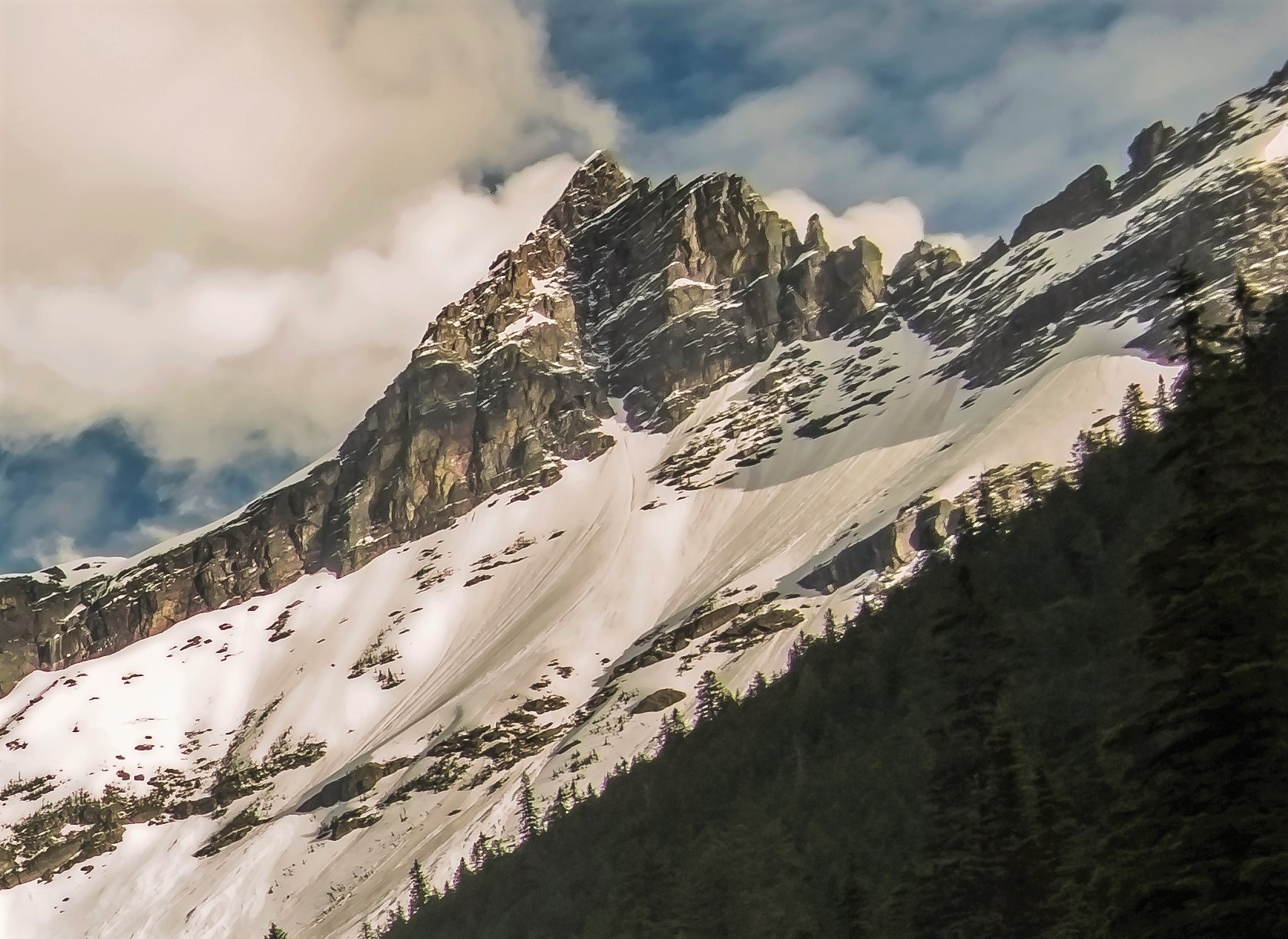
From Avalanche Lake
