= Gunsight Mountain (Montana) =

Mountain in Glacier Park

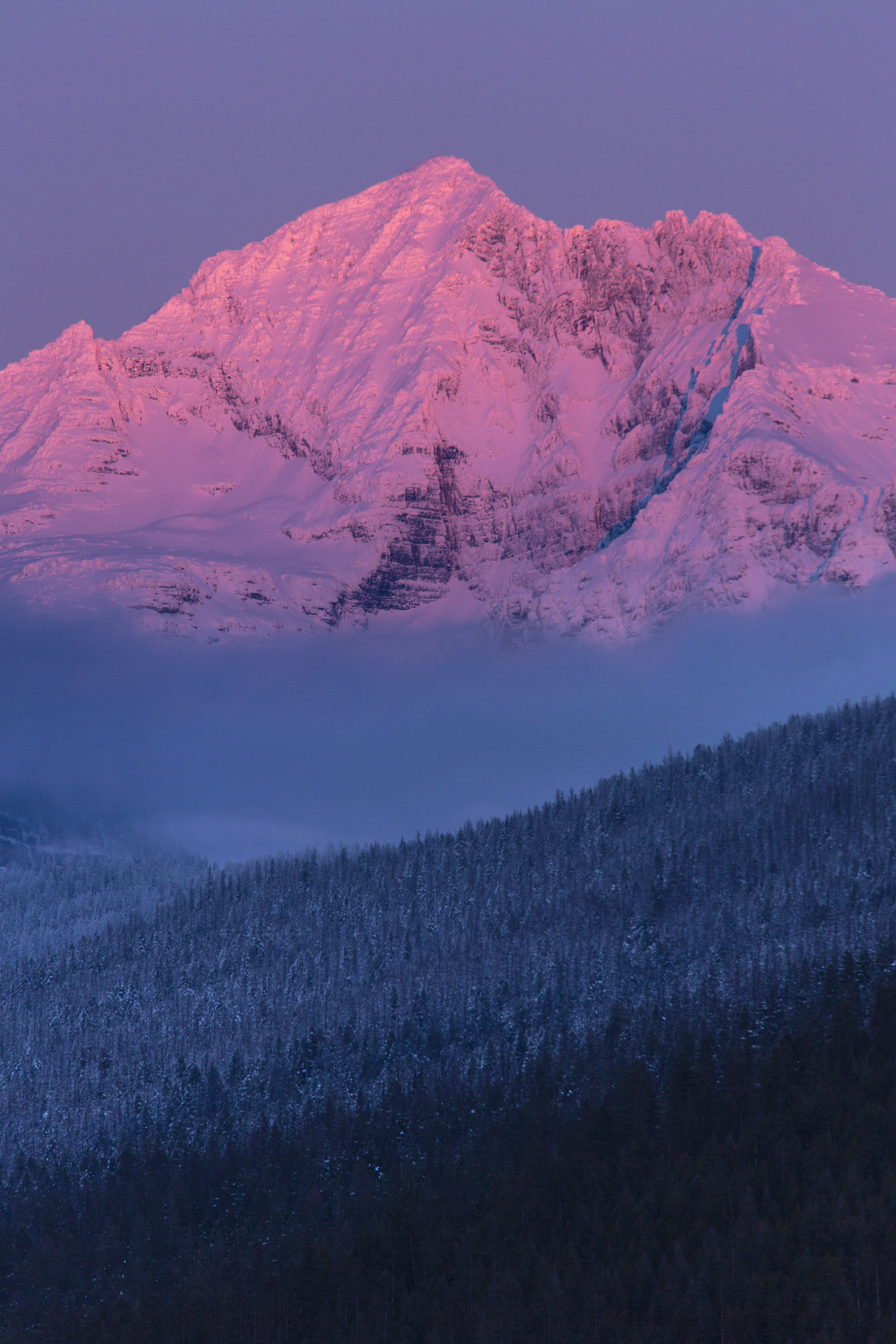
- Gunsight Mountain at sunset

Highest point
- Elevation: 9,263 ft (2,823 m)
- Prominence: 2,312 ft (705 m)
- Coordinates: 48°36′53″N 113°46′06″W

Geography
- Location within Montana Location within the United States
- Country: United States
- State: Montana
- County: Flathead
- Protected area: Glacier National Park
- Parent range: Lewis Range
- Topo map: USGS Lake McDonald East

Climbing
- First ascent: Lyman Sperry (1905)

Gunsight Mountain (9,263 feet (2,823 m)) is located in the Lewis Range, Glacier National Park in the U.S. state of Montana. Gunsight Mountain is named after the adjacent Gunsight Pass, which was named by George Bird Grinnell in 1891.

== Geology ==
Like other mountains in Glacier National Park, Gunsight Mountain is composed of sedimentary rock laid down during the Precambrian to Jurassic periods. Formed in shallow seas, this sedimentary rock was initially uplifted beginning 170 million years ago when the Lewis Overthrust fault pushed an enormous slab of precambrian rocks 3 mi (4.8 km) thick, 50 miles (80 km) wide and 160 miles (260 km) long over younger rock of the cretaceous period.

== See also ==
- Mountains and mountain ranges of Glacier National Park (U.S.)
